= List of caves =

This is a list of caves of the world that have published names. Inclusion in this list requires a Wikipedia link or a citation to a reliable source for verification. They are sorted by continent and then country. Caves which are in overseas territories on a different continent than the home country are sorted by the territory's continent and name. There is a separate list of show caves, i.e. only those caves that are publicly accessible.

== Africa ==
=== Algeria ===
- Aïn Taïba – Oasis and pit cave in Ouargla Province, Algeria
- Anou Achra Lemoun – Cave of Djurdjura in Algeria
- Anou Boussouil – Limestone karst cave in the mountains of Djurdjura, Algeria
- Anou Ifflis – Cave in the mountains of the Kabylie in Algeria
- Anou Timedouine
- Gueldaman caves – Karst network of caves in the Soummam valley in Algeria
- Ghar Boumâaza (Rivière De La Tafna)
- Grotte de Cervantes
- Kef Al Kaous

=== Botswana ===
- Gcwihaba
- Rhino Cave

=== Cameroon ===
- Gouffre de Mbilibekon
- Grottes de Linté
- Grotte de Loung
- Grotte de Mfouda
- Grotte Fovu
- Grottes Ndemvoh
- Kouo vu

=== Democratic Republic of Congo ===
- Matupi Cave
- Thysville Caves

=== Egypt ===
- Cave of Beasts
- Cave of Swimmers
- Jabal al-Ṭārif
- Sannur Cave
- Magharet el Kantara

=== Ethiopia ===
- Sof Omar Caves

=== Gabon ===
- Abanda Caves
- Caves of Lastoursville
- Iroungou Cave
- Mbenaltembe Cave
- Faucon Cave

=== Kenya ===
- Enkapune Ya Muto
- Kitum Cave
- Leviathan Cave
- Mau Mau Caves
- Njoro River Cave
- Paradise Lost Caves

=== Lesotho ===
- Kome Caves

=== Libya ===
- Ain Zayanah
- Bukarma-Habibi
- Umm al Masabih
- Haua Fteah

=== Madagascar ===
- Ambatoanjahana
- Ambatoharanana
- Ambatomanjahana
- Anjanamba Cave
- Ampandrianpanihy Nord
- Andetobe
- Andriafiabe
- Anjohin'ny Voamboana
- Anjohy Ambalarano
- Anjohy Kibojenjy
- Antsatrabonko
- Riviere souterraine de Mananjeba
- Marosakabe cave system

=== Mauritania ===
- Agrour Amogjar

=== Morocco ===
- Caves of Hercules
- Friouato Caves
- Ifri N'hamed N'taouia
- Ifri Oudadane
- Jebel Irhoud
- Kef Aziza
- Kef Tikhoubaï
- Kef Toghobeit Cave
- Rhar Chara
- Rhar Chiker
- Taforalt
- Wit Tamdoun

=== Mozambique ===
- Codzo River cave

=== Nigeria ===
- Amanchor Cave
- Ogbunike Caves

=== Namibia ===
- Apollo 11 Cave
- Arnhem Cave
- Dragon's Breath Cave
- The White Lady

=== Réunion ===
- Mussard Cave

=== Rwanda ===
- Ubuvumo Bwibihonga
- Ubuvumo Nyabikuri-Ruri
- Ubuvumo Manjari deux
- Ubuvumo bwa Musanze (main segment)
- Ubuvumo bwa Nyirabadogo
- Ubuvumo Cyamazera
- Ubuvumo Gacinyiro 2
- Ubuvumo bwa Musanze (south segment)
- Ubuvumo Nyiragihima
- Ubuvumo Rego

=== Somaliland ===
- Dhambalin
- Laas Geel

=== South Africa ===
- Blombos Cave
- Boesmansgat
- Boomplaas Cave
- Border Cave
- Burchell's Shelter
- Cango Caves
- Cooper's Cave
- Diepkloof Rock Shelter
- Echo Caves
- Gladysvale Cave
- Gondolin Cave
- Haasgat
- Howieson's Poort Shelter
- De Kelders
- Klasies River Caves
- Kromdraai fossil site
- Makapansgat
- Malapa Fossil Site, Cradle of Humankind
- Mapoch's Caves
- Melkhoutboom Cave
- Motsetsi Cave
- Nelson Bay Cave
- Onmeetbarediepgat
- Pinnacle Point
- Plovers Lake
- Rising Star Cave
- Sacred caves of the Basotho
- Sibudu Cave
- Sterkfontein
- Sudwala Caves
- Taung
- Witsie's Cave
- Wonder Cave
- Wonderwerk Cave

=== Tanzania ===
- Amboni Caves
- Grotte de Nduli
- Mumba Cave
- Nandembo cave System

=== Togo ===
- Nok and Mamproug Cave Dwellings

=== Tunisia ===
- Rhar Ain Et Tsab

=== Zambia ===
- Kalemba Rockshelter
- Mumbwa Caves

=== Zimbabwe ===
- Bambata Cave
- Chinhoyi Caves
- Mabura Caves
- Mawenge Mwena Caves of Chimanimani
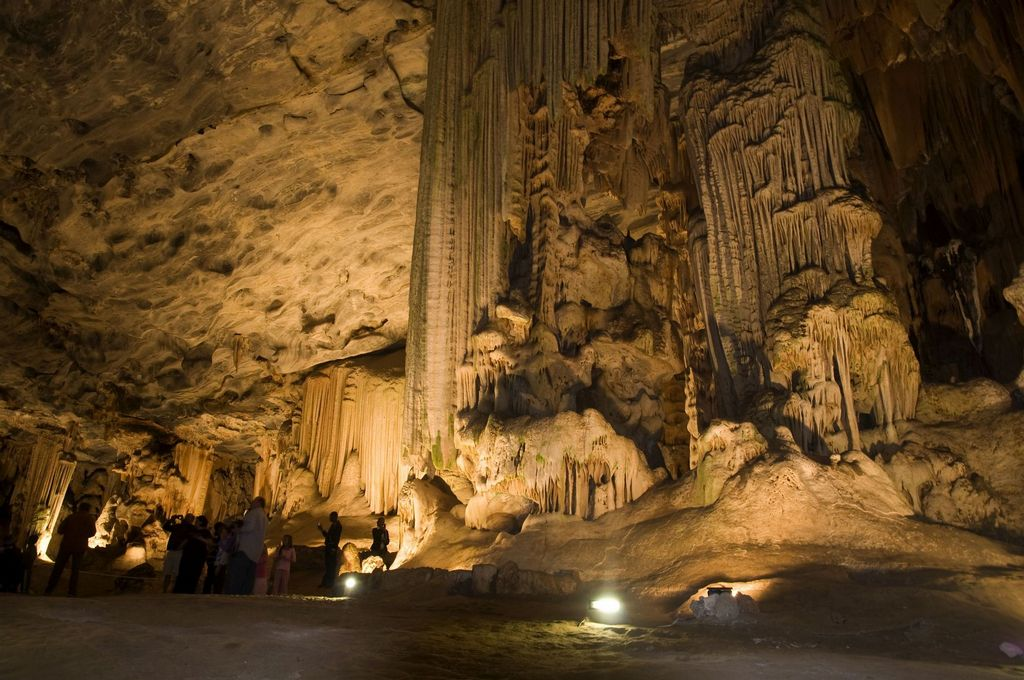
The Cango Caves in Western Cape.

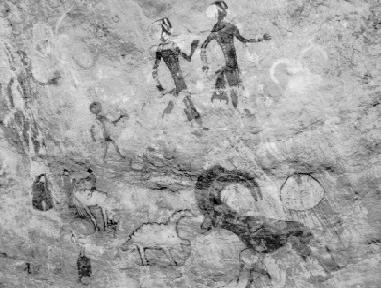
African cave paintings

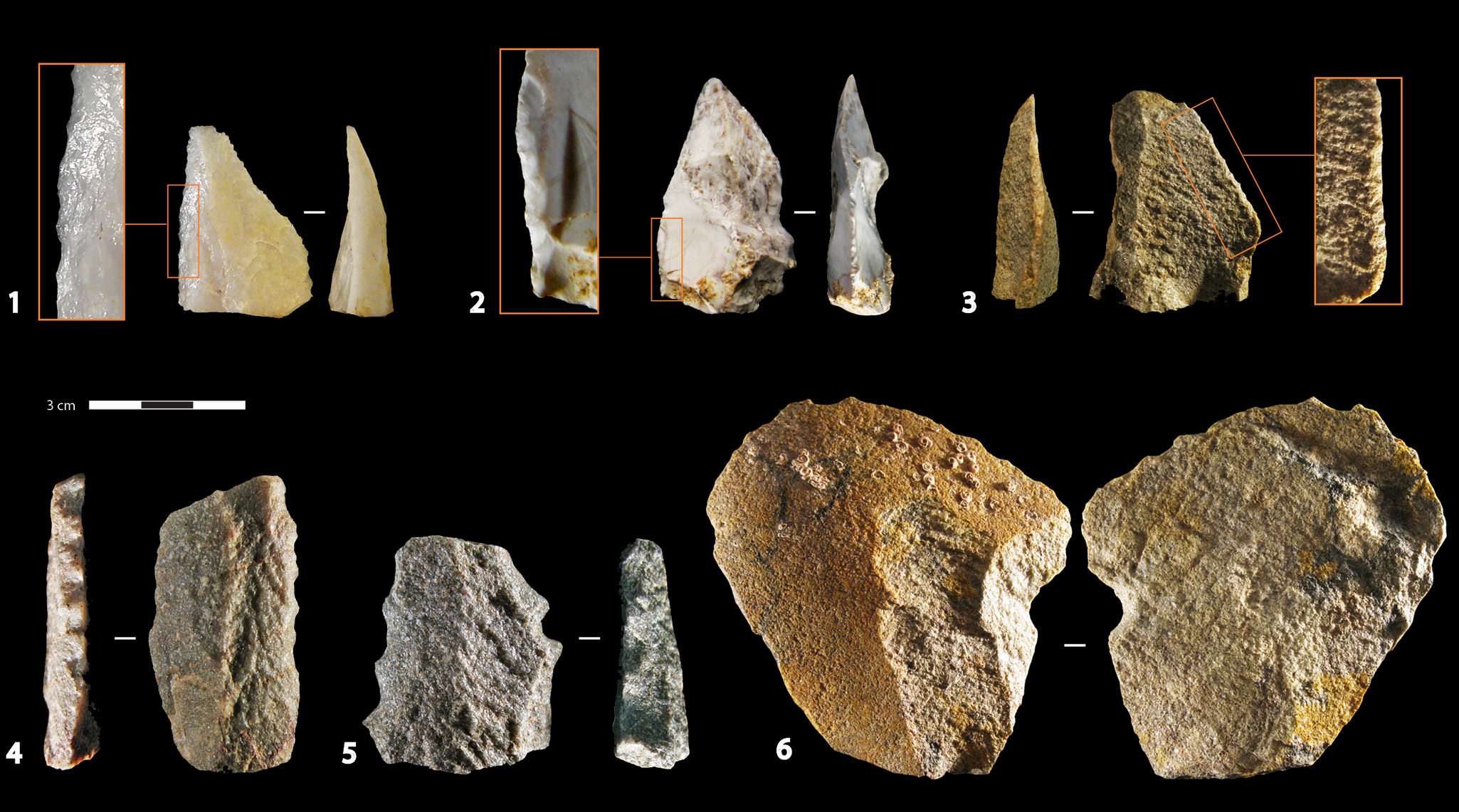
Lithic Industries at Blombos Cave, Southern Cape, South Africa

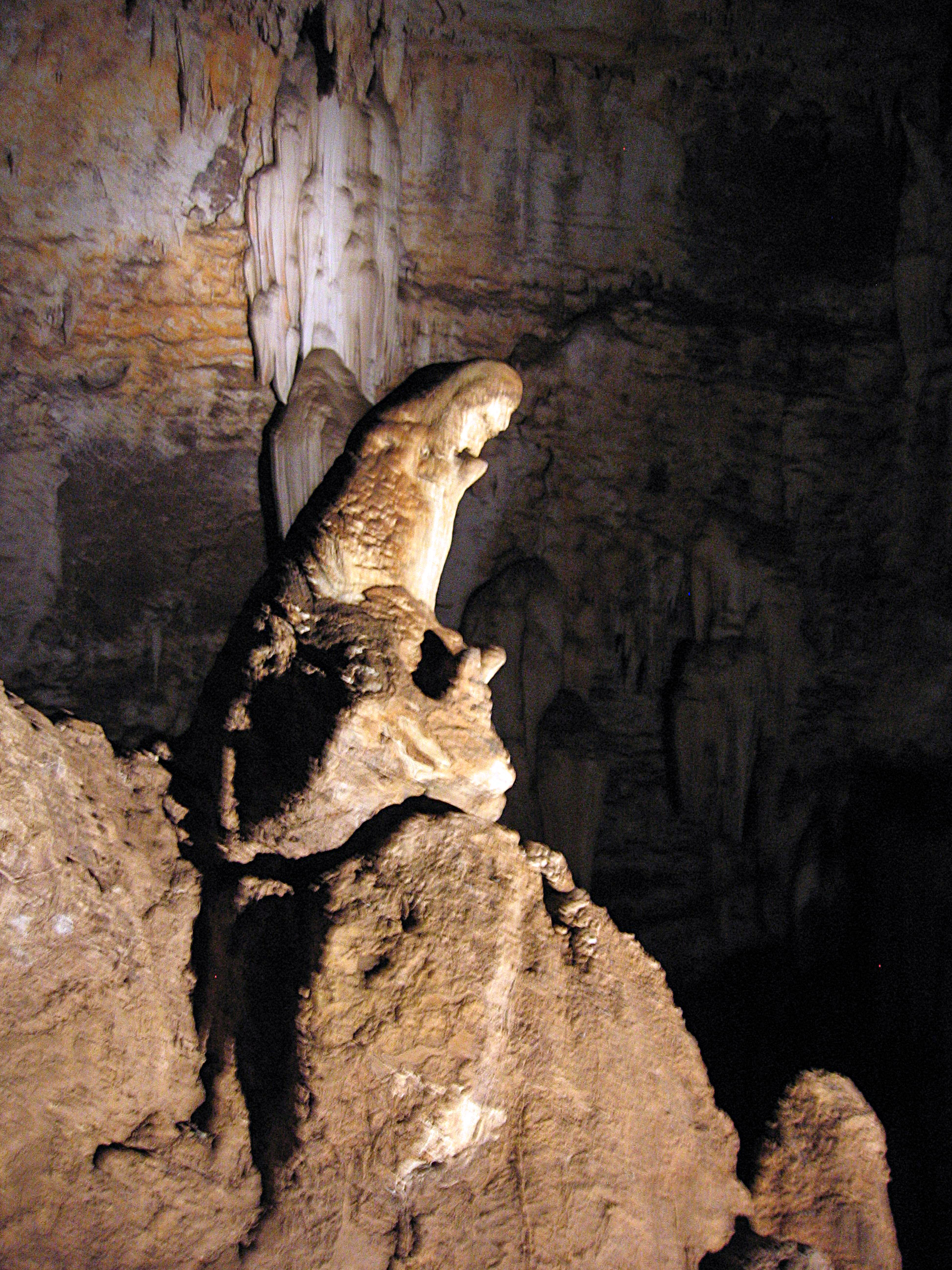
Wonder Caves Praying Mary

== Asia ==
=== Afghanistan ===
- Darra-e Kur
- Tora Bora
- Zhawar Kili

=== Armenia ===
- Areni-1 Cave
- Azokh Cave

=== Azerbaijan ===
- Allar Cave
- Ashabi-Kahf in Nakhchivan
- Azokh Cave
- Buzeyir Cave
- Damjili Cave
- Tağlar Cave
- Zar Cave

=== Cambodia ===
- Roung Dei Ho–Thom Ken
- Laang Spean
- Phnom Chhnork
- Phnom Sampeau
- Phnom Sorsia

=== China ===
- Benxi Water Caves
- Bezeklik Caves
- Binghu Cave
- Er Wang Dong
- Furong Cave
- Fuyan Cave
- Gebihe cave system
- Grottoes of Tongtian Rock
- Hongqingsi Grottoes
- Huanglong Cave
- Jiangzhou Cave System
- Jiguan Cave
- Kizil Caves
- Kumtura Caves
- Longgu Cave
- Longyou Caves
- Luobi Cave
- Macaque Cave
- Reed Flute Cave
- San Wang Dong
- Sanmenhai
- Seven-star Cave
- Shanjuan Cave
- Shuanghedong Cave Network
- Shuanglong Cave
- Silver Cave
- Snowy Jade Cave
- Taiji Cave
- Tenglong Cave
- Tianyuan Cave
- Xianren Cave
- Yilong Cave
- Yiyuan Rong Cave Group
- Yuchanyan Cave
- Yuhuangdong Grottoes
- Zhijin Cave
- Zhong Cave
- Zhoukoudian
- Zengpiyan Cave
- Zhiren Cave

=== East Timor ===
- Lene Hara Cave

=== Georgia ===
- Abrskil Cave
- Cave of Bethlehem
- Krubera Cave
- New Athos Cave
- Sarma Cave
- Satsurblia Cave
- Tsona Cave

=== India ===
- Ajanta Caves
- Amarnath Cave Temple
- Badami Cave Temples
- Bagh Caves
- Barabar Caves
- Belum Caves
- Borra Caves
- Caves of Meghalaya
- Edakkal Caves
- Elephanta Caves
- Ellora Caves
- Erravaram Caves
- Guntupalli Caves
- Jogeshwari Caves
- Kailash Caves
- Kanheri Caves
- Karla Caves
- Kotumsar Cave
- Krem Liat Prah
- Krem Synrang Pamiang
- Lakhudiyar Caves
- Lenyadri
- Lohani Caves
- Mahakali Caves
- Mandapeshwar Caves
- Mogalrajapuram Caves
- Pandavleni Caves
- Patal Bhuvaneshwar
- Robber's Cave
- Rock Shelters of Bhimbetka
- Siju Cave
- Umachal rock cave
- Undavalli Caves
- Varaha Cave Temple

=== Indonesia ===
- Buniayu Cave
- Caves in the Maros-Pangkep karst
- Harimau Cave
- Liang Bua Cave
- Lokale
- Lubang Jeriji Saléh
- Maharani Cave
- Mirror Stone Cave
- Pettakere cave
- Pindul Cave

=== Iran ===
- Ali-Sadr Cave
- Bisitun Cave
- Darband Cave
- Dashkasan
- Do-Ashkaft Cave
- Eshkaft-e Salman
- Eshkaft-e Siahoo
- Ghar Parau
- Ghar-e-Pariyan
- Ghar-e-Roodafshan
- Huto and Kamarband Caves
- Kalahrod
- Karaftu Caves
- Katale Khor
- Mahi Kur Cave
- Nakhcheer
- Qaleh Bozi
- Quri Qale Cave
- Roodafshan Cave
- Saholan Cave
- Shafaq Cave
- Shapur Cave
- Shirabad Cave
- Wezmeh
- Yafteh

=== Iraq ===
- Shanidar Cave

=== Israel ===
- Avshalom Cave
- Ayalon Cave
- Azekah Caves
- Beit She'arim (moshav)
- Cave of Elijah
- Cave of Horror
- Cave of Letters
- Cave of Nicanor
- Es Skhul
- HaYonim Cave
- Horvat Midras
- Kebara Cave
- Keshet Cave
- Komotayim cave
- Kutim Cave
- Malcham Cave
- Mankhir Cave
- Manot Cave
- Nahal Me'arot
- Pa'ar Cave
- Qesem Cave
- Rosh HaNikra grottoes
- Salt Colonel Cave
- Tabun Cave
- Tel Maresha

=== Japan ===
- Abukuma-do (阿武隈洞)
- Akiyoshi-do (秋芳洞)
- Akkadō (安家洞)
- Kyusen-do (球泉洞)
- Reigandō
- Uchimagi-do (内間木洞)
- Shiraho Saonetabaru Cave Ruins

=== Jordan ===
- Iraq ed-Dubb
- Al-Fahda Cave

=== Kazakhstan ===
- Akbaur Cave
- Boj-Boulok
- Rangkul'skaja Cave

=== Korea ===
- Geomunoreum Lava Tube System
- Gimnyeonggul
- Gosu Cave
- Gwangmyeong Cave
- Hwanseon Cave
- Jeju Volcanic Island and Lava Tubes
- Komun Moru
- Manjanggul
- Songam Cavern
- Billemotdonggul

=== Laos ===
- Chom Ong
- Pak Ou Caves
- Tam Pa Ling Cave
- Tham Jang
- Tham Kong Lo
- Tham Non
- Tham Pha
- Tham Phu Kham
- Tham Sang Triangle
- Viengxay Caves

=== Lebanon ===
- Antelias Cave
- Jeita Grotto
- Nachcharini
- el-Mathkoube
- Kaukaba
- Ksar Akil
- Ras Baalbek I
- Ras El Kelb

=== Malaysia ===
- Batu Caves
- Biocyclone Cave
- Clearwater Cave
- Deer Cave
- Gomantong Cave
- Gua Tempurung
- Niah Caves
- Sam Poh Tong
- Sarawak Chamber

=== Mongolia ===
- Dayan Deerh Cave
- Galtai Cave
- Khoit Tsenkher Cave
- Taliin Cave
- Tsagaan Cave

=== Myanmar ===
- Padah-Lin Caves
- Peik Chin Myaung Cave
- Phowintaung
- Pindaya Caves

=== Nepal ===
- Chobhar Caves
- Gupteshwor Mahadev Cave
- Mahendra Cave
- Maratika Cave
- Mustang Caves
- Siddha Cave

=== Oman ===
- Al Hoota Cave
- Majlis al Jinn

=== Pakistan ===
- Bazar Caves
- Pir Ghaib Gharr Gharra
- Kashmir Smast
- Sanghao Cave

=== Philippines ===
- Adiangao Cave
- Bantay Abot Cave
- Callao Cave
- Caves in Misamis Oriental
- Guyangan Cave System
- Hinagdanan Cave
- Huluga Caves
- Kalanay Cave
- Kutawato Caves
- Lapuz Lapuz Cave
- Libmanan Caves National Park
- Lucsuhin Natural Bridge
- Macahambus Cave
- Minori Cave
- Monfort Bat Sanctuary
- Pamitinan Cave
- Puerto Princesa Subterranean River National Park
- Sohoton Cave
- Tabon Cave

=== Qatar ===
- Al Mukaynis
- Dahl Al Misfir

=== Saudi Arabia ===
- Umm Jirsan System

=== Sri Lanka ===
- Andirilena Cave
- Batatotalena Cave
- Belilena Cave
- Bogoda Cave
- Dambulla Cave Temple
- Fa Hien Cave
- Hunugalagala Limestone Cave
- Kuragala
- Lahugala Cave
- Nitro Cave
- Pannila Cave
- Rawana Ella Cave
- Sithripura Cave
- Wavulpone Cave

=== South Korea ===
- Geumganggul Cave

=== Taiwan ===
- Lobster Cave

=== Thailand ===
- Banyan Valley Cave
- Doi Nang Non
- Emerald Cave
- Naresuan Cave
- Spirit Cave
- Tham Hua Kalok
- Tham Lot
- Tham Mae Lana
- Tham Phra Wang Daeng

=== Turkey ===
- Akhayat sinkhole
- Ayvaini Cave
- Ballıca Cave
- Belbaşı
- Beldibi Cave
- Buzluk
- Cave dwellings of Ahlat
- Çayırköy Cave
- Cehennem Cave
- Cehennemağzı Cave
- Cennet Cave
- Cumayanı Cave
- Damlataş Cave
- Derebucak Çamlık Caves
- Dupnisa Cave
- Erçek Cave
- Egma Sinkhole
- Gilindire Cave
- Gökgöl Cave
- Ilıksu Cave
- İnağzı Cave
- Inkaya Cave
- İnsuyu Cave
- Karaca Cave
- Karain Cave
- Kızılelma Cave
- Kocain Cave
- Nimara Cave
- Oylat Cave
- Pınargözü Cave
- Sofular Cave
- Tilkiler Cave
- Yarımburgaz Cave
- Yenesu Cave
- Zeytintaşı Cave

=== Turkmenistan ===
- Cave of Dzhebel
- Koytendag Caves

=== Uzbekistan ===
- Boybuloq Cave
- Dark Star
- Obi-Rakhmat Grotto
- Teshik-Tash

=== West Bank ===
- Cave of the Patriarchs
- Cave of the Ramban
- Qumran
- Warren's Shaft
- Zedekiah's Cave
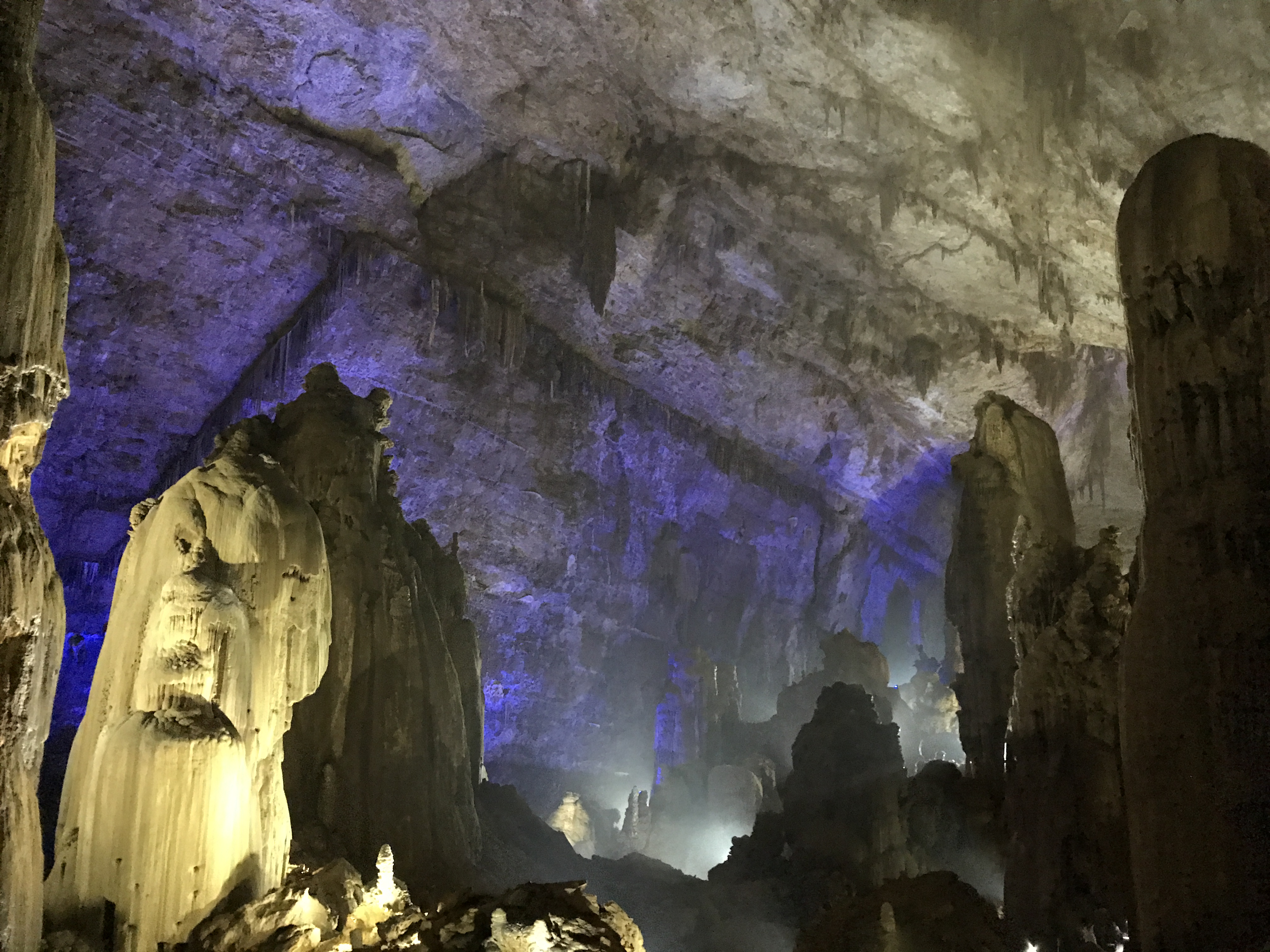
Zhijin Cave is believed to possess the largest unsupported roof span of any cave worldwide.

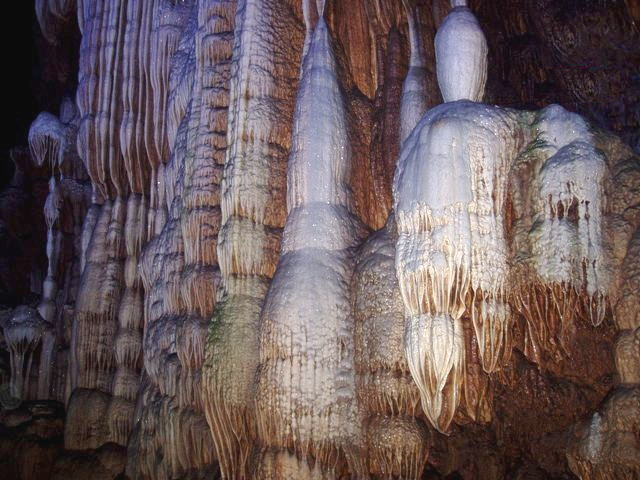
Seven-star Cave – a Karst cave with limestone formations, near Guilin in Guangxi Province, southern China

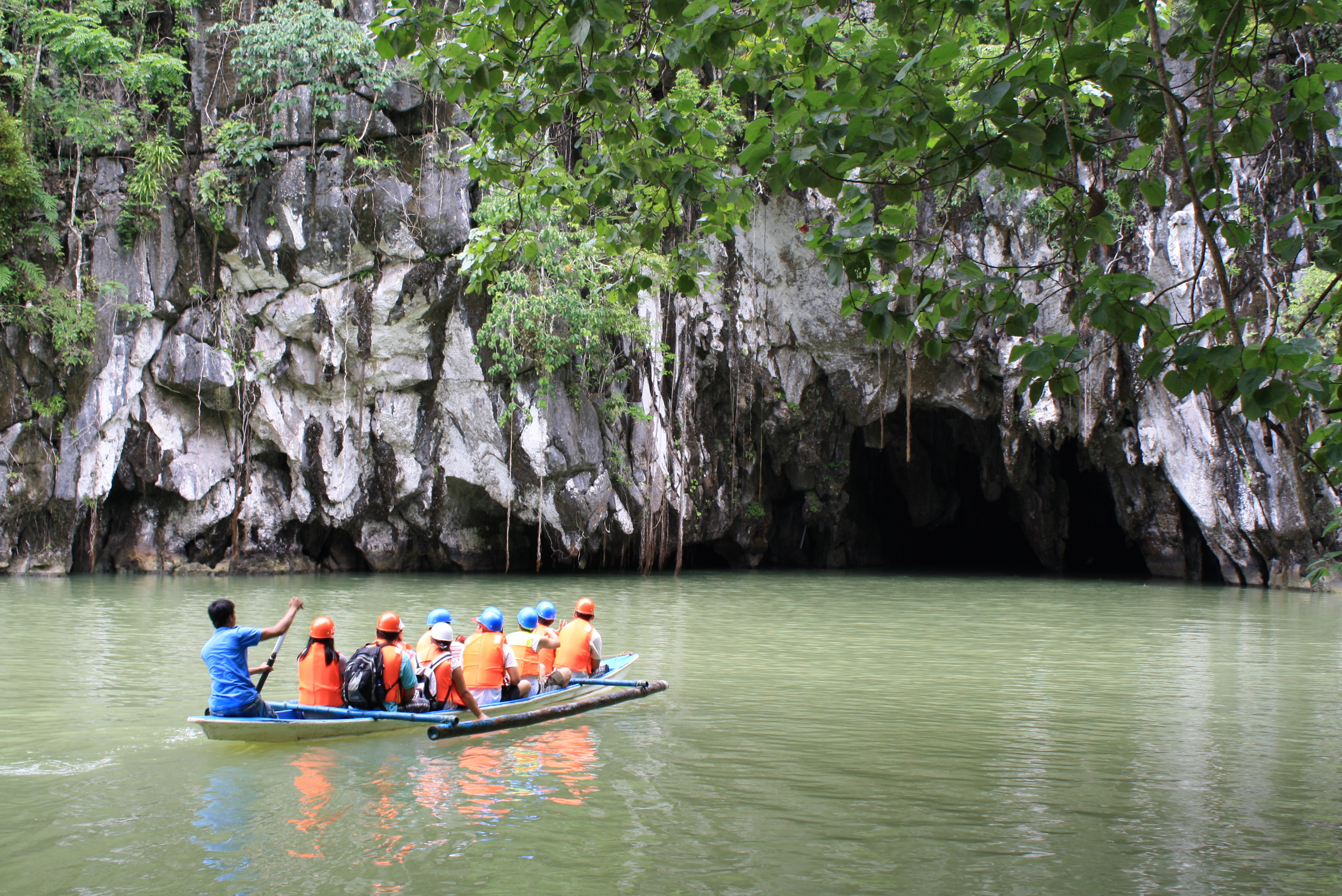
Entrance to the underground river at Puerto Princesa Subterranean River National Park

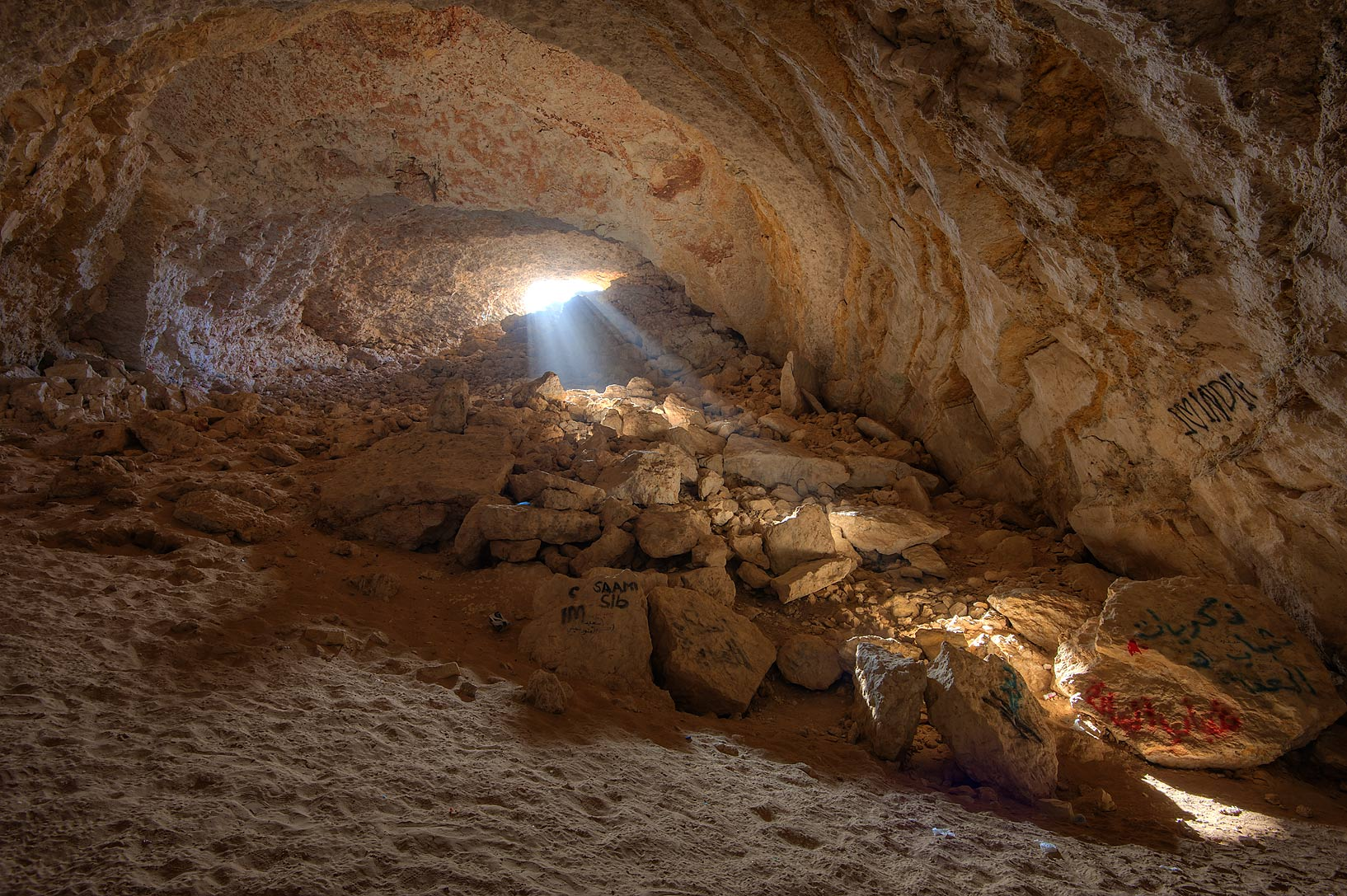
Dahl Al Misfir Cave

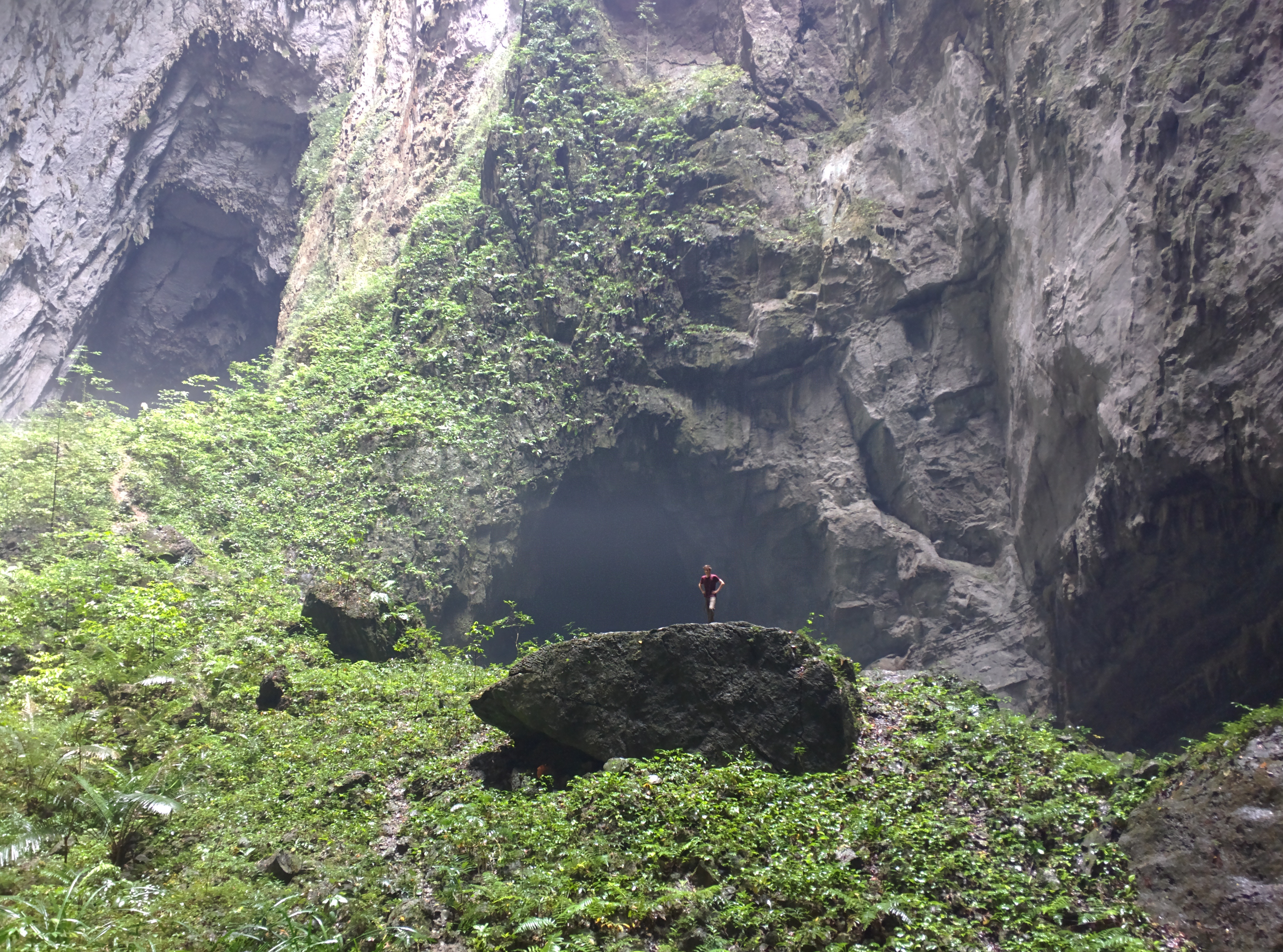
Hang Sơn Đoòng's main passage is the largest known cave passage in the world.

== Europe ==
=== Austria ===
- Drachenhöhle
- Eisriesenwelt
- Gudenus Cave
- Lamprechtsofen
- Lurgrotte
- Salzofen Cave
- Schwarzmooskogel Cave System
- Seegrotte
- Spannagel Cave
- Steinbrücken Cave
- Tischofer Cave
- Traungold Cave
- Unicorn Cave

=== Belgium ===
- Caves of Han-sur-Lesse
- Caves of Hotton
- Goyet Caves
- Grotte de Rosée
- Neptune Caves
- Naulette
- Scladina
- Spy Cave
- Trou de l’Abîme

=== Bosnia and Herzegovina ===
- Badanj Cave – Cave and archaeological site in Herzegovina
- Vjetrenica – Largest cave in Bosnia and Herzegovina

=== Bulgaria ===
- Bacho Kiro Cave – Archaeological site in Bulgaria
- Devetashka Cave – Cave and archaeological site in Bulgaria
- Kozarnika – Cave and archaeological site in Bulgaria
- Ledenika – Cave in the Balkan Mountains
- Magura Cave – Cave and archaeological site in Bulgaria
- Orlova Chuka – Cave in Bulgaria
- Devil's Throat Cave – Cave in Bulgaria
- Prohodna – Cave in Bulgaria
- Saeva dupka – Cave in Lovech Province, Bulgaria
- Snezhanka Cave – Cave in Bulgaria
- Uhlovitsa
- Yagodinska Cave – Cave in the Rhodope Mountains, Bulgaria

=== Croatia ===
- Amfora Pit
- Baredine Cave
- Biserujka – Karst cave on the island of Krk, Croatia
- Blue Grotto – Waterlogged sea cave the island of Biševo, Croatia
- Caves of Barać – Group of caves in Rakovica, Croatia
- Drakonjina špilja – Cave on Brač, Croatia
- Grabovača
- Grapčeva Cave – Cave and archaeological site in Croatia
- Jazovka – Site of mass executions in Croatia
- Red Lake – Sinkhole lake in Split-Dalmatia, Croatia
- Vela Spila – Cave and archaeological site in Croatia
- Velebit Caves – Caves in Croatia
- Vindija Cave – Cave and archaeological site in Croatia
- Vrtare Male – Cave in Croatia with remnants of prehistoric animals

=== Czech Republic ===
- Amatérská Cave – Cave and archaeological site in the Czech Republic
- Býčí skála – Cave and archaeological site in the Czech Republic
- Hranice Abyss – Flooded sinkhole near the town of Hranice, Czech Republic
- Klácelka
- Koněprusy Caves – Cave and archaeological site in the Czech Republic
- Kůlna Cave – Cave and archaeological site in the Czech Republic
- Macocha Gorge in the Punkva Caves
- Mladeč Caves – Cave complex and archaeological site in the Czech Republic
- Moravian Karst – Karst landscape and protected landscape area in Czech Republic
- Punkva Caves – Cave system of the Czech Republic
- Šipka – Cave and archaeological site in the Czech Republic
- Zbrašov aragonite Caves

=== Denmark ===
- Sorte Gryde
- Sorte Ovn
- Våde Ovn

=== Finland ===
- Wolf Cave

=== France ===
- Aven Armand
- Aven d'Orgnac
- Barry Troglodyte Village
- Caverne du Pont-d'Arc
- Caves of Arcy-sur-Cure
- Caves of Gargas
- Chauvet Cave
- Choranche Cave
- Bournillon Cave
- Réseau de la Dent de Crolles
- Font-de-Gaume
- Gouffre Berger
- Réseau du Clot d'Aspres
- Gournier Cave
- Gouy Cave
- Grotte des Demoiselles
- Grottes du Cerdon
- Grottes Pétrifiantes de Savonnières
- Grottes de Presque
- Jean Bernard System
- La Mansonnière Cave
- La Verna Cave
- Lascaux Cave
- Les Combarelles
- Niaux Cave
- Padirac Cave
- Pech Merle
- Gouffre Mirolda
- Gouffre de la Pierre Saint-Martin
- Rouffignac Cave
- Villars Cave

=== Germany ===
- Aachtopf
- Atta Cave
- Balve Cave
- Barbarossa Cave
- Baumann's Cave
- Bing Cave
- Blauhöhle
- Blautopf
- Brillenhöhle
- Caves and Ice Age Art in the Swabian Jura
- Charlotte Cave
- Daneil's Cave
- Das verfluchte Jungfernloch
- Dechen Cave
- Devil's Cave
- Easter Cave
- Eberstadt Stalactite Cave
- Erdmanns Cave
- Geissenklösterle
- Goetz Cave
- Heimkehle
- Hermann's Cave
- Hohler Fels
- Hohlenstein-Stadel
- Iberg Dripstone Cave
- Kleine Feldhofer Grotte
- Lichtenstein Cave
- Marienglashöhle
- Ofnet Caves
- Riesending Cave
- Saalfeld Fairy Grottoes
- Schellenberg Ice Cave
- Sirgenstein Cave
- Sophie Cave
- Unicorn Cave
- Vogelherd Cave
- Volkmarskeller
- Weingartenloch
- Wimsener Höhle

=== Gibraltar ===
- Gorham's Cave
- Ibex Cave
- Martin's Cave
- St. Michael's Cave
- Vanguard Cave

=== Greece ===
- Alepotrypa Cave
- Apidima Cave
- Arkaliospilio
- Arkoudiotissa Cave
- Asphendou Cave petroglyphs
- Blue Cave
- Cave of Euripides
- Cave of the Lakes
- Corycian Cave
- Davelis Cave
- Dersios sinkhole
- Doxa
- Eileithyia Cave
- Franchthi Cave
- Gourgouthakas
- Kleidi Cave
- Megalakkos
- Ossa Cave
- Petralona Cave
- Phyle Cave
- Propantes
- Sacred caves of Crete
- Stravomyti
- Sykia (Voula)
- Theopetra Cave
- Vari Cave
- Klissoura Cave 1

=== Hungary ===
- Aggtelek Karst
- Anna Cave
- Baradla-Domica Cave System
- Cave Bath
- Caves of Aggtelek Karst and Slovak Karst
- Gellért Hill Cave
- István Cave
- Molnár János Cave
- Rákóczi Cave
- Szelim Cave

=== Iceland ===
- Búri
- The Caves of Ægissíða
- Grjótagjá
- Hellnahellir
- Kverkfjöll
- Landmannahellir
- Surtshellir
- Víðgelmir

=== Ireland ===
- Aillwee Cave
- Ballymaglancy Cave
- Caves of Kesh
- Cloyne Cave
- Crag Cave
- Doolin Cave
- Dunmore Caves
- Fintan's Grave
- Kelly's Cave
- Killavullen Caves
- Marble Arch Caves
- Mitchelstown Caves
- Noon's Hole
- Pollatoomary
- Pollnagollum
- Shannon Cave
- St Patrick's Purgatory

=== Italy ===
- Abisso Bonetti
- Abisso Bueno Fonteno
- Arene Candide
- Blue Grotto
- Borgio Verezzi Caves
- Castelcivita Caves
- Castellana Caves
- Cave of Dogs
- Coreca Caves
- Deer Cave
- Duino Mithraeum
- Ear of Dionysius
- Frasassi Caves
- Grotta Bianca
- Grotta del Castiglione
- Grotta del Cavallo
- Grotta del Cavallone
- Grotta del Pisco
- Grotta dell'Addaura
- Grotta dell'Arco
- Grotta dell'Arsenale
- Grotta dell'Artiglieria
- Grotta della Sibilla
- Grotta delle Felci
- Grotta Delle Prazziche
- Grotta dello Smeraldo
- Grotta di Ispinigoli
- Grotta di Matromania
- Grotte di Pilato
- Grotta Gigante
- Grotta Grande Del Ciolo
- Grotta Piccola Del Ciolo
- Grotta Regina del Carso
- Grotta Verde
- Monte Kronio
- Neptune's Grotto
- Nereo Cave
- Paglicci Cave
- Pastena Caves
- Pertosa Caves
- Romito Cave
- Scurati Caves
- Toirano Caves

=== Kosovo ===
- Marble Cave
- Gryka e Madhe Cave
- Shpella e Kallabes
- Shpella e Karamakazit
- Shpella e Radavcit

=== Latvia ===
- Gutmanis Cave
- Liv Sacrifice Caves

=== Malta ===
- Blue Grotto
- Ghar Dalam
- Għar ix-Xiħ
- Ghar Lapsi
- Ninu's Cave
- Ras id-Dawwara
- Xerri's Grotto

=== North Macedonia ===
- Alilica
- Pešna

=== Norway ===
- Greftkjelen
- Greftsprekka
- Grønligrotta
- Jarlshola
- Jordbrugrotta
- Larshullet
- Oskola-Kristihola
- Radiohola
- Raggejavreraige
- Setergrotta
- Svarthola
- Tjoarvekrajgge
- Trollkirka

=== Poland ===
- Bańdzioch Kominiarski
- Jaskinia Czarna
- Jaskinia Kozia
- Jaskinia Miętusia
- Jaskinia Mylna
- Jaskinia Niedźwiedzia
- Jaskinia Raj
- Jaskinia Wielka Śnieżna
- Piwniczka
- Ptasia Studnia
- Radochów Cave
- Smocza Jama
- Śnieżna Studnia

=== Portugal ===
- Almonda Cave
- Cave of Aroeira
- Cave of Pedra Furada
- Cave of Pego do Diabo
- Cave of Salemas
- Escoural Cave
- Furnas do Cavalum
- Mira de Aire Caves
- Moinhos Velhos Cave
- São Vicente Caves
- Torres Cave

=== Romania ===
- Bears' Cave
- Coliboaia Cave
- Cuciulat Cave
- Movile Cave
- Peștera cu Oase
- Peștera Muierilor
- Peștera Vântului
- Scărișoara Cave
- Tăușoare-Zalion Reserve
- Topolnița Cave

=== Russia ===
- Akhshtyrskaya Cave
- Avilova Cave
- Chertovy Vorota Cave
- Denisova Cave
- Ignatievka Cave
- Kapova Cave
- Kungur Ice Cave
- Kurgazak Cave
- Marble Cave
- Mezmaiskaya Cave
- Okladnikov Cave
- Orda Cave
- Salavat Yulayev Cave
- Sugomak Cave
- Syukeyevo Caves
- Vorontsovka Caves
- Vyalova Cave

=== Serbia ===
- Brežđe
- Cave Church
- Cerje Cave
- Degurić Cave
- Hadži-Prodan's Cave
- Kađenica
- Lazareva Pećina
- Pešturina
- Petnica Cave
- Potpeć Cave
- Rajko's Cave
- Resava Cave
- Risovača Cave
- Stopića Cave

=== Slovakia ===
- Belianska Cave
- Bystrianska Cave
- Demänovská Cave of Liberty
- Demänovská Ice Cave
- Dobšiná Ice Cave
- Domica Cave
- Driny
- Gombasek Cave
- Harmanecká Cave
- Jasovská Cave
- Krásnohorská Cave
- Ochtinská Aragonite Cave
- Važecká Cave

=== Slovenia ===
- Cross Cave
- Divje Babe
- Hell Cave
- Krka Cave
- Planina Cave
- Postojna Cave
- Potok Cave
- Škocjan Caves
- System Migovec
- Vilenica Cave
- Vrtoglavica
- Weaver Cave

=== Spain ===
- Altamira
- Armintxe Cave
- Canelobre Caves
- Cave of Altamira and Paleolithic Cave Art of Northern Spain
- Cave of Chufín
- Cave of El Castillo
- Cave of El Soplao
- Cave of La Pasiega
- Cave of Niño
- Cave of the Barranc del Migdia
- Cave of Valporquero
- Caves in Cantabria
- Caves of King Cintolo
- Caves of Nerja
- Caves of Valeron
- Coves dels Hams
- Cueva de la Fuente
- Cueva de la Pileta
- Cueva de los Casares
- Cueva de los Murciélagos
- Cueva de los Verdes
- Cueva de Montesinos
- Cueva del Viento
- Cuevas de El Castillo
- Cuevas de la Araña
- Cuevas de Sorbas
- Cuevas del Drach
- Four Doors cave site
- Fuentemolinos Cave
- Grotte Casteret
- Gruta de las Maravillas
- Las Caldas Cave
- Ojo Guareña
- Ordesa Cascada
- Painted Cave
- Praileaitz Cave
- Simanya Cave
- Santa Cueva de Covadonga
- Santuario de la Cueva Santa
- Sidrón Cave
- Tito Bustillo Cave

=== Sweden ===
- Coral Cave
- Hoverbergsgrottan
- Lummelunda Cave

=== Switzerland ===
- Grotte aux Fées
- Grotte de Cotencher
- Grotte du Bichon
- Hölloch
- Kesslerloch
- Saint-Léonard underground lake
- Schweizersbild
- Siebenhengste-Hohgant-Höhle
- St. Beatus Caves
- Wildenmannlisloch
- Wildkirchli

=== Ukraine ===
- Atlantida
- Lysenia Cave
- Kyrnychky Cave
- Mlynky Cave
- Near Caves
- Odessa Catacombs
- Optymistychna
- Priest's Grotto
- Saint Anthony's Caves
- Verteba Cave
- Vyalova Cave

=== United Kingdom ===
- Alum Pot
- Aquamole Pot
- Aveline's Hole
- Badger Pot
- Bakers pit
- Bar Pot
- Blue John Cavern
- Boho Caves
- Boxhead Pot
- Cathole Cave
- Charterhouse Cave
- Chislehurst Caves
- Clearwell Caves
- Cleeves Cove
- Cox's Cave
- Crackpot Cave
- Creswell Crags
- Crystal Cave
- Dan yr Ogof
- Death's Head Hole
- Disappointment Pot
- Dog Hole Cave
- Ease Gill Caverns
- Eastwater Cavern
- Eden Sike Cave
- Excalibur Pot
- Father Foote's Cave
- Fingal's Cave
- Flood Entrance Pot
- Gaping Gill
- Gavel Pot
- GB Cave
- Giant's Hole
- Goatchurch Cavern
- Gough's Cave
- Great Douk Cave
- Great Masson Cavern
- Great Rutland Cavern
- Heathery Burn Cave
- Ingleborough Cave
- Jib Tunnel
- Juniper Gulf
- Kents Cavern
- Kirkdale Cave
- La Cotte de St Brelade
- Lamb Leer
- Langcliffe Pot
- Long Churn Cave
- Long Drop Cave
- Longwood Swallet
- Lost John's Cave
- Lost Pot
- Manor Farm Swallet
- Marble Arch Caves
- Mossdale Caverns
- Mother Ludlam's Cave
- Mother Shipton's Cave
- Nidderdale Caves
- Noon's Hole
- Ogof Agen Allwedd
- Ogof Craig a Ffynnon
- Ogof Draenen
- Ogof Ffynnon Ddu
- Ogof Hen Ffynhonnau
- Ogof Hesp Alyn
- Ogof Llyn Parc
- Ogof y Daren Cilau
- Otter Hole
- Oxlow Cavern
- Pate Hole
- Peak Cavern
- Pen Park Hole
- Pierre's Pot
- Poole's Cavern
- Portbraddon Cave
- Porth Yr Ogof
- Pridhamsleigh Cavern
- Rat Hole
- Reed's Cave
- Reservoir Hole
- Rhino Rift
- Rowten Pot
- Rumbling Hole
- Ryedale Windypits
- Shannon Cave
- Shatter Cave
- Short Drop Cave
- Sidcot Swallet
- Simpson Pot
- Skirwith Cave
- Slaughter Stream Cave
- Smoo Cave
- Speedwell Cavern
- St Cuthbert's Swallet
- Stoke Lane Slocker
- Stream Passage Pot
- Stump Cross Caverns
- Swildon's Hole
- Swinsto Cave
- Thor's Cave
- Three Counties System
- Thrupe Lane Swallet
- Titan
- Treak Cliff Cavern
- Uamh an Claonaite
- Upper Flood Swallet
- Weathercote Cave
- White Scar Caves
- Wookey Hole Caves
- Yordas Cave

== North America ==
=== Belize ===
- Actun Box Ch'iich'
- Actun Tunichil Muknal
- Barton Creek Cave
- Che Chem Ha Cave
- Chiquibul Cave System
- Great Blue Hole
- Midnight Terror Cave
- Nohoch Che'en

=== Bermuda ===
- Crystal Cave

=== Canada ===
- Arctomys Cave
- Artlish Caves Provincial Park
- Bluefish Caves
- Booming Ice Chasm
- Cadomin Cave
- Canyon Creek Ice Cave
- Castleguard Cave
- Cave and Basin National Historic Site
- Cavernicole Cave
- Charlie Lake Cave
- Close to the Edge
- Cody Caves
- Gargantua
- The "Hole in the Wall"
- Horne Lake Caves Provincial Park
- Nakimu Caves
- Raspberry Rising Cave
- Trou du Diable
- Warsaw Caves

=== El Salvador ===
- Holy Spirit Grotto

=== Guatemala ===
- Actún Can
- Candelaria Caves
- Chiquibul Cave System
- Cuevas del Silvino
- Grutas de Lanquín
- Naj Tunich

=== Honduras ===
- Cuevas de Taulabé
- Cuyamel Caves
- Talgua Caves

=== Mexico ===
- Balankanche
- Cacahuamilpa Cave
- Cave of the Crystals
- Cave of Swallows
- Chan Hol
- Chevé Cave
- Chiquihuitillos
- Choo-Ha
- Coxcatlan Cave
- Cueva de Villa Luz
- Devil's Throat at Punta Sur
- Frightful Cave
- Guilá Naquitz Cave
- Grutas de Cacahuamilpa National Park
- Grutas de García
- Jolja'
- Juxtlahuaca
- Loltun Cave
- Ndaxagua
- Sistema Dos Ojos
- Sistema Nohoch Nah Chich
- Sistema Ox Bel Ha
- Sistema Sac Actun
- Tolantongo
- Zacatón

=== Panama ===
- Bayano Caves

=== United States ===
- Aeolus Cave, Vermont
- Airmen's Cave, Texas
- Alabaster Caverns State Park, Oklahoma
- Antelope Cave, Arizona
- Ape Cave, Washington
- Arnold Lava Tube System, Oregon
- Ash Hollow Cave, Nebraska
- Baker Cave, Texas
- Bandera Volcano Ice Cave, New Mexico
- Bat Cave, Kentucky
- Bat Cave, Arizona
- Batcheller's Cave, New Hampshire
- Beaver Valley Rock Shelter Site, Delaware
- Bechan Cave, Utah
- Bell Witch Cave, Tennessee
- Big Bone Cave, Tennessee
- Big Four Ice Caves, Washington
- Black Chasm Cave, California
- Blanchard Springs Caverns, Arkansas
- Blowhole Cave, Utah
- Blue Spring Cave, Tennessee
- Bluespring Caverns, Indiana
- Bluff Dweller's Cave, Missouri
- Bobcat Trail Habitation Cave, Hawaii
- Boone's Cave Park, North Carolina
- Boyd Cave, Oregon
- Boyden Cave, California
- Bracken Cave, Texas
- Bridal Cave, Missouri
- Bristol Caverns, Tennessee
- Buckeye Creek Cave, West Virginia
- Buckner Cave, Indiana
- Bull Shoals Caverns, Arkansas
- Bull Thistle Cave Archaeological Site, Virginia
- Burnet Cave, New Mexico
- Burro Flats Painted Cave, California
- California Caverns, California
- Carlsbad Caverns, New Mexico
- Cascade Cave, Kentucky
- Cascade Caverns, Texas
- Cass Cave, West Virginia
- Cathedral Caverns State Park, Alabama
- Cave-in-Rock, Illinois
- Cave of the Bells, Arizona
- Cave of the Mounds, Wisconsin
- Cave of the Winds, Colorado
- Cave of the Winds, New York
- Cave Without a Name, Texas
- Caverns of Sonora, Texas
- Caves of St. Louis, Missouri
- Charles Town Cave, West Virginia
- Cheese Cave, Washington
- Cherney Maribel Caves County Park, Wisconsin
- Clarks Cave, Virginia
- Clarksville Cave, New York
- Cliff Cave, Missouri
- Cold Water Cave, Iowa
- Colossal Cave, Arizona
- Colossal Cave, Kentucky
- Conkling Cavern, New Mexico
- Coronado Cave, Arizona
- Cosmic Cavern, Arkansas
- Coudersport Ice Mine, Pennsylvania
- Craighead Caverns, Tennessee
- Crystal Cave, Sequoia National Park, California
- Crystal Cave, Kentucky
- Crystal Cave, Ohio
- Crystal Cave, Pennsylvania
- Crystal Cave, Wisconsin
- Crystal Cavern, Alabama
- Crystal Grottoes, Maryland
- Cumberland Bone Cave, Maryland
- Cumberland Caverns, Tennessee
- Current River Cavern, Missouri
- Danger Cave, Utah
- Decorah Ice Cave State Preserve, Iowa
- Derrick Cave, Oregon
- DeSoto Caverns, Alabama
- Devil's Den Cave, Florida
- Devil's Kitchen, Michigan
- Devils Hole, Nevada
- Devilstep Hollow Cave, Tennessee
- Diamond Caverns, Kentucky
- Dixie Caverns, Virginia
- Dragon Cave, Pennsylvania
- Dunbar Cave State Park, Tennessee
- Dust Cave, Alabama
- Eagle Cave, Wisconsin
- Ellenville Fault Ice Caves, New York
- Eleven Jones Cave, Kentucky
- Ellison's Cave, Georgia
- Endless Caverns, Virginia
- False Kiva, Utah
- Fantastic Caverns, Missouri
- Fern Cave National Wildlife Refuge, Alabama
- Fern Grotto, Hawaii
- Fisher Ridge Cave System, Kentucky
- Florida Caverns, Florida
- Fitton Cave, Arkansas
- Fort Rock Cave, Oregon
- Fox Cave, New Mexico
- Franktown Cave, Colorado
- Gap Cave, Virginia
- Gardner Cave, Washington
- Glenwood Caverns, Colorado
- Glover's Cave, Kentucky
- Goochland Cave, Kentucky
- Grand Caverns, Virginia
- Grand Canyon Caverns, Arizona
- Great Onyx Cave, Kentucky
- Gypsum Cave, Nevada
- Hall City Cave, California
- Haynes Cave, West Virginia
- Hellhole, West Virginia
- Hendrie River Water Cave, Michigan
- Hidden Cave, Nevada
- Hobo Cave, Colorado
- Hogup Cave, Utah
- Horse Cave, Kentucky
- Horse Caves, Massachusetts
- Horse Lava Tube System, Oregon
- Howe Caverns, New York
- Hubbard's Cave, Tennessee
- Humboldt Cave, Nevada
- Ice Cave, Iowa
- Illinois Caverns, Illinois
- Indian Cave State Park, Nebraska
- Indian Caverns, Pennsylvania
- Indian Echo Caverns, Pennsylvania
- Indian Jim's Cave, Virginia
- Indiana Caverns, Indiana
- Infernal Caverns, California
- Inner Space Caverns, Texas
- Jacobs Cavern, Missouri
- Jacob's Well, Texas
- Jewel Cave, South Dakota
- Kartchner Caverns, Arizona
- Kazumura Cave, Hawaii
- Key Cave National Wildlife Refuge, Alabama
- Kickapoo Cavern State Park, Texas
- King Phillip's Cave, Massachusetts
- Kingston Saltpeter Cave, Georgia
- Kuna Caves, Idaho
- Lake Shasta Caverns, California
- Laurel Caverns, Pennsylvania
- Lava Beds National Monument, California
- Lava River Cave, Arizona
- Lava River Cave, Oregon
- Lechuguilla Cave, New Mexico
- Lehman Caves, Nevada
- Leon Sinks Geological Area, Florida
- Lewis and Clark Caverns, Montana
- Linville Caverns, North Carolina
- Lockport Cave, New York
- Logan Cave National Wildlife Refuge, Arkansas
- Lookout Mountain Caverns, Tennessee
- Lost Cove Cave, Tennessee
- Lost River Cave, Kentucky
- Lost River Caverns, Pennsylvania
- Lost River Gorge Cave, New Hampshire
- Lost World Caverns, West Virginia
- Lovelock Cave, Nevada
- Luray Caverns, Virginia
- Makauwahi Cave, Hawaii
- Mammoth Cave National Park, Kentucky
- Mammoth Cave, Utah
- Manitou Cave, Alabama
- Mantle's Cave, Colorado
- Maquoketa Caves State Park, Iowa
- Marengo Cave, Indiana
- Mark Twain Cave, Missouri
- Marmes Rockshelter, Washington
- Martin Ridge Cave System, Kentucky
- Marvel Cave, Missouri
- Mary Campbell Cave, Ohio
- Meramec Caverns, Missouri
- Mercer Caverns, California
- Minnetonka Cave, Idaho
- Mitchell Caverns, California
- Moaning Cavern, California
- Moqui Cave, Utah
- Mud Caves, California
- Mummy Cave, Wyoming
- Mystery Cave, Minnesota
- Mystic Caverns and Crystal Dome, Arkansas
- Natural Bridge Caverns, Texas
- Natural Tunnel State Park, Virginia
- Neffs Cave, Utah
- Nickajack Cave, Tennessee
- Niter Ice Cave, Idaho
- Nutty Putty Cave, Utah
- Ogdens Cave Natural Area Preserve, Virginia
- Ohio Caverns, Ohio
- Old Spanish Treasure Cave, Arkansas
- Olentangy Indian Caverns, Ohio
- Oligo-Nunk Cave System, Kentucky
- Onondaga Cave State Park, Missouri
- Onyx Cave, Arizona
- Onyx Cave, Arkansas
- Onyx Cave, Missouri
- Oregon Caves National Monument, Oregon
- Organ Cave, West Virginia
- Ozark Caverns, Missouri
- Paisley Caves, Oregon
- Paradise Ice Cave, Washington
- Peacock Springs Cave System, Florida
- Pellerito Cave, Michigan
- Pendejo Cave, New Mexico
- Penns Cave, Pennsylvania
- Peppersauce Cave, Arizona
- Petty John's Cave, Georgia
- Pictograph Cave, Arkansas
- Pictograph Cave, Montana
- Pluto's Cave, California
- Polar Caves Park, New Hampshire
- Port Kennedy Bone Cave, Pennsylvania
- Raccoon Mountain Caverns, Tennessee
- Redmond Caves, Oregon
- Research Cave, Missouri
- Ricks Spring, Utah
- Rickwood Caverns State Park, Alabama
- Riverbluff Cave, Missouri
- Robbers Cave State Park, Oklahoma
- Rock Dove Cave, Texas
- Rumbling Falls Cave, Tennessee
- Ruby Falls Cave, Tennessee
- Rushmore Cave, South Dakota
- Russell Cave, Alabama
- Samuels' Cave, Wisconsin
- Sandia Cave, New Mexico
- Sandy Glacier Caves, Oregon
- Sauta Cave National Wildlife Refuge, Alabama
- Sea Lion Caves, Oregon
- Seneca Caverns, Ohio
- Seneca Caverns, West Virginia
- Shawnee Cave, Indiana
- Shelta Cave, Alabama
- Shelter Cave, New Mexico
- Shenandoah Caverns, Virginia
- Sinks of Gandy, West Virginia
- Sitting Bull Crystal Caverns, South Dakota
- Skeleton Cave, Arizona
- Skeleton Cave, Oregon
- Skull Cave, Michigan
- Skylight Cave, Oregon
- Skyline Caverns, Virginia
- Smoke Hole Caverns, West Virginia
- Snail Shell Cave, Tennessee
- Snowy River Cave, New Mexico
- Spook Cave, Iowa
- Squire Boone Caverns, Indiana
- Spring Cave, Colorado
- Spring Creek Cave, Texas
- Spring Mill State Park, Indiana
- Spring Valley Caverns, Minnesota
- St. John Mine, Wisconsin
- Stay High Cave, Virginia
- Talking Rocks Cavern, Missouri
- Tears of the Turtle Cave, Montana
- Thumping Dick Hollow, Tennessee
- Timpanogos Cave National Monument, Utah
- Toquima Cave, Nevada
- Tory Cave, New York
- Tory's Cave, Connecticut
- Tory's Cave, Vermont
- Tuckaleechee Caverns, Tennessee
- Twin caves, Indiana
- Tyson Spring Cave, Minnesota
- Tytoona Cave, Pennsylvania
- Unthanks Cave Natural Area Preserve, Virginia
- Ursa Minor, California
- Ventana Cave, Arizona
- Wabasha Street Caves, Minnesota
- Wakulla Cave, Florida
- Warren's Cave, Florida
- Weeki Wachee Springs, Florida
- Wilson Butte Cave, Idaho
- Wind Cave National Park, South Dakota
- Wonder Cave, Texas
- Wonderland Cave, Arkansas
- Wyandotte Caves, Indiana
- Zane Shawnee Caverns, Ohio
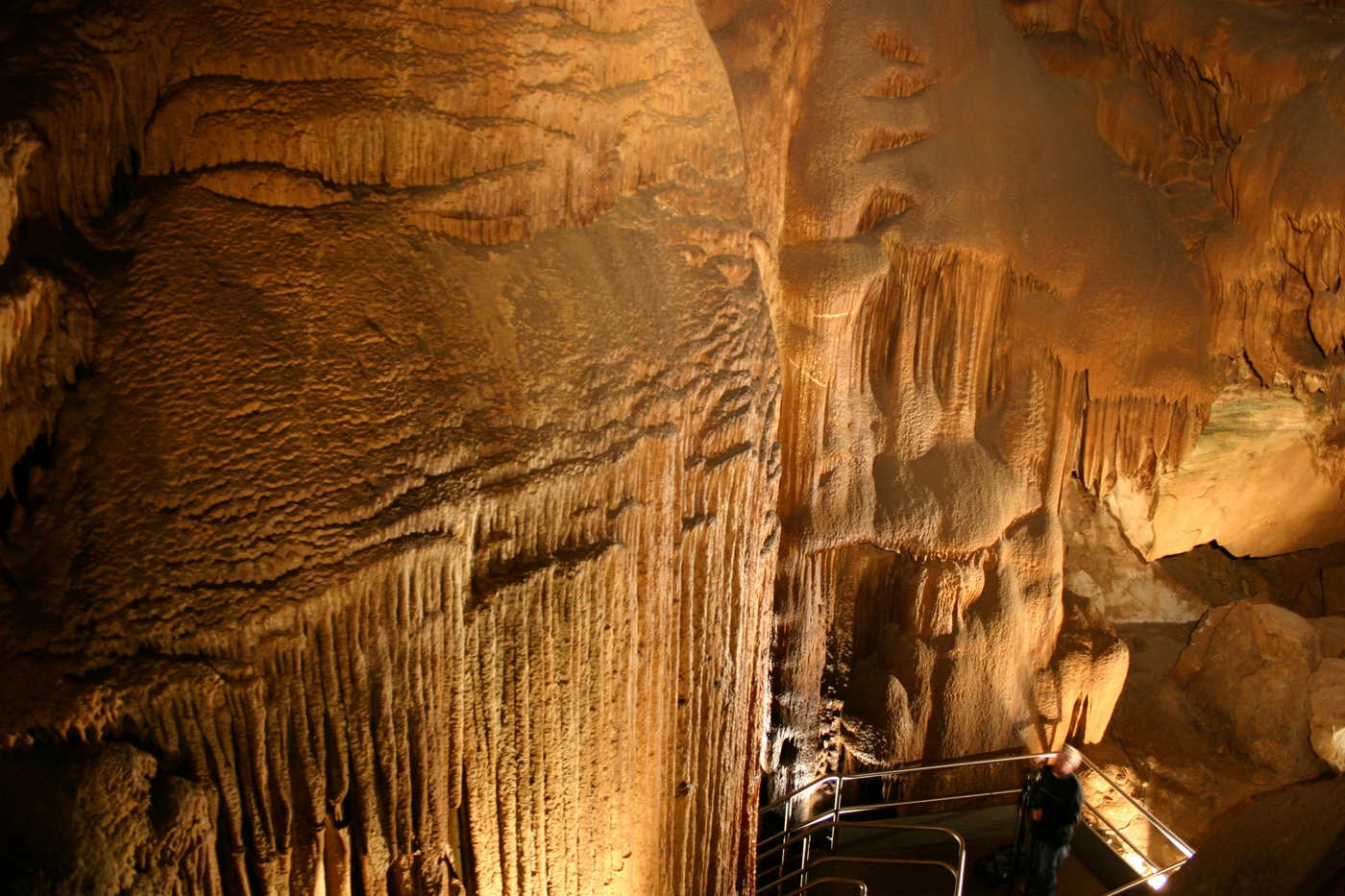
Flowstone found in Mammoth Cave.

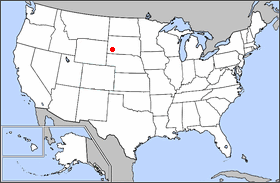
Location map of Wind Cave.

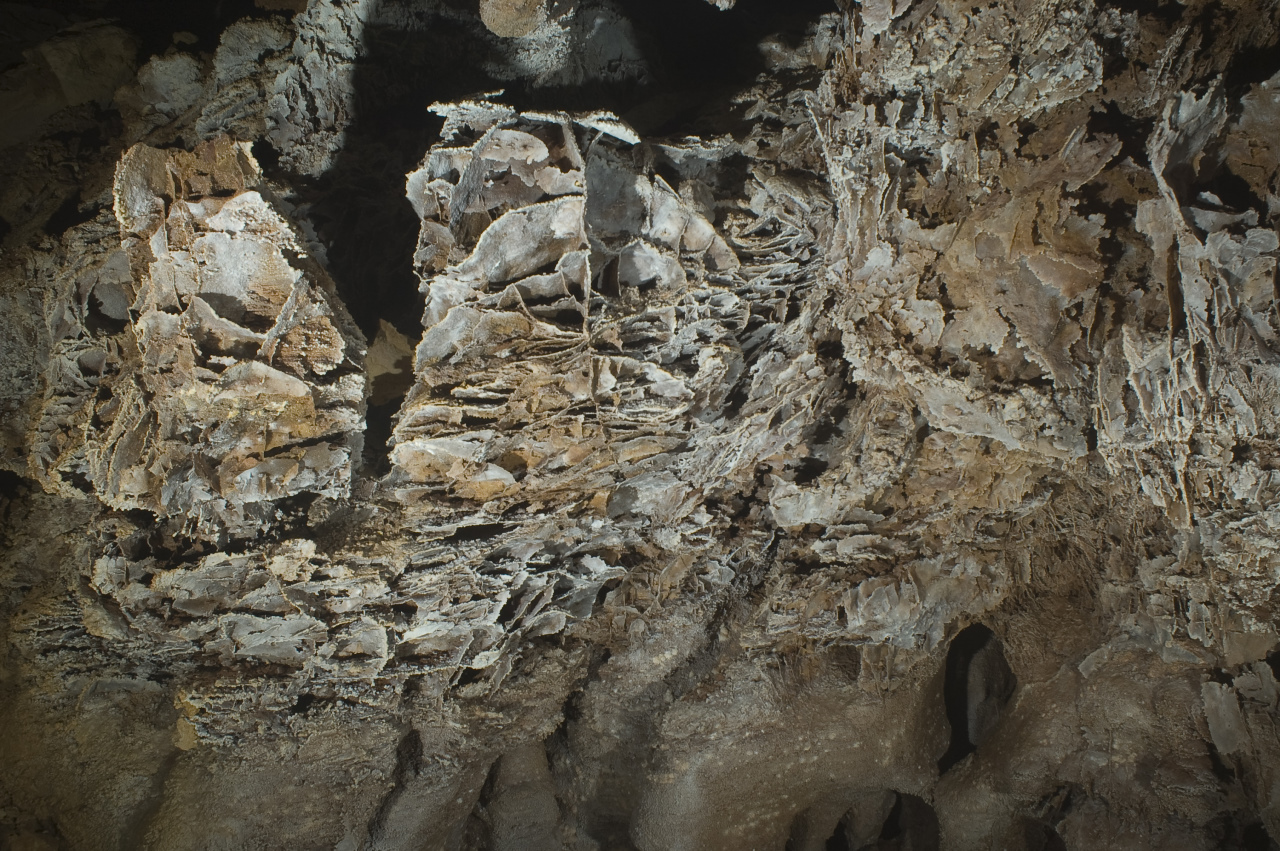
Wind Cave.

== Caribbean ==
=== Aruba ===
- Aruba Natural Bridge
- Quadiriki Caves

=== Bahamas ===
- Lucayan Caverns (Ben's Cave)

=== Barbados ===
- Animal Flower Cave
- Harrison's Cave

=== Curaçao ===
- Hato Caves

=== Cuba ===
- Ambrosio Cave
- Cuevas de Bellamar
- Cueva de Saturno
- La Gran Caverna de Santo Tomás
- Gran Caverna de Palmarito

=== Dominican Republic ===
- Cuevas Fun Fun
- Pomier Caves
- Los Tres Ojos
- Cuevas de las Maravillas
- Furnia de Catanamatias

=== Haiti ===
- Bellony Cave
- Kounoubwa Cave
- Marie-Jeanne Cave
- Voûte-à-Minguet

=== Jamaica ===
- Bad Hole Cave
- Belmont Cave
- Carambie Cave
- Coffee River Cave
- Dunn's Hole
- Gourie Cave
- Green Grotto Caves
- Hutchinson's Hole
- Jackson's Bay Cave
- Long Mile Cave
- Morgans Pond Hole
- Mouth Maze Cave
- Oxford Cave
- Smokey Hole Cave
- Swansea Cave
- Thatchfield Great Cave
- Windsor Great Cave
- Xtabi

=== Puerto Rico ===
- Cueva de Los Indios
- Cueva del Indio
- Cuevas Las Cabachuelas
- Cueva Lucero
- Cueva Ventana
- Parque Nacional de las Cavernas del Río Camuy
- Pozo de Jacinto

=== Saint Lucia ===
- Bat Cave

=== Saint Vincent and the Grenadines ===
- Byahaut Bat Cave

=== Trinidad and Tobago ===
- Aripo Cave
- Crusoe Cave
- Cumaca Cave
- Dunston Cave
- Lopinot Cave
- Tamana Caves

=== Turks and Caicos Islands ===
- Conch Bar Caves

== South America ==
=== Argentina ===
- Cave 3, Los Toldos (Santa Cruz)
- Cueva de la Bruja
- Cueva de Gualicho
- Cueva de las Manos
- Cueva del Tigré
- Witches' Cave

=== Bolivia ===
- Cavernas de Repechón
- Ch'usiq Uta
- Cueva del Diablo
- Qala Qala

=== Brazil ===
- Abismo Guy Collet
- Abismo Ouro Grosso
- Areado Grande
- Buraco das Araras, Goiás
- Buraco das Araras, Mato Grosso do Sul
- Caverna Aroe Jari
- Caverna da Pedra Pintada
- Caverna da Tapagem
- Caverna de Santana
- Caverna dos Ecos
- Cavernas do Peruaçu National Park
- Conjunto Santa Rita
- Conjunto São Mateus
- Gruta Canabrava
- Gruta Casa de Pedra
- Gruta da Cabana
- Gruta da Morena
- Gruta da Torrinha
- Grutas das Areias
- Gruta de Maquiné
- Gruta de Ubajara
- Gruta do Centenário
- Gruta do Janelão
- Gruta do Lago Azul Natural Monument
- Gruta do Padre
- Gruta Olhos d'Água
- Gruta Rei do Mato
- Lapa da Mangabeira
- Lapa do Convento
- Lapa do Salitre
- Lapa dos Brejões
- Lapa Terra Ronca
- Parque da Cascata
- Poço Encantado
- Serra do Ramalho
- Toca da Barriguda
- Toca da Boa Vista

=== Chile ===
- Cueva del Pirata
- Cueva de los Pincheira
- Catedral de Mármol
- Cueva del Milodón
- Cueva Fell
- Roiho cave system
- Perte du Futur
- Perte de la Détente
- Perte des Lobos
- Perte du Temps

=== Colombia ===
- Guacharos Cave
- Cueva del Hipocampo
- Hoyo de la Campesino
- Cueva de la Tronera
- Cueva de los Carracos
- Hoyo de los Ocelotes
- Hoyo de la Neblina

Hoyo Sid El Perezoso

=== Ecuador ===
- Cueva de los Tayos

=== Peru ===
- Chivateros
- Guitarrero Cave
- Hatun Uchku
- Killa Mach'ay
- Pikimachay
- Pumawasi
- Qaqa Mach'ay
- Shihual
- Sima Pumacocha
- Tampu Mach'ay
- Toquepala Caves

=== South Georgia and the South Sandwich Islands ===
- Cave Cove

=== Suriname ===
- Werehpai

=== Uruguay ===
- Palace Cave

=== Venezuela ===
- Cueva Alfredo Jahn Natural Monument
- Cueva de la Quebrada del Toro
- Cueva del Fantasma
- Cueva del Guácharo
- Cueva del Saman
- Cueva La Segunda Cascada
- Cueva Los Encantos
- Cueva Los Laureles
- Cueva-Sumidero La Retirada
- Haitón del Guarataro
- Sima Aonda
- Sima Aonda 2
- Sima Aonda 3
- Sima Auyantepui Noroeste
- Sima Auyantepui Norte
- Sima Humboldt
- Sima Martel

== Oceania ==
=== Australia ===
- Abercrombie Caves
- Abrakurrie Cave
- Ashford Caves
- Bakara Well Cave
- Borenore Caves
- Buchan Caves
- Bungonia Caves
- Camooweal Caves National Park
- Capricorn Caves
- Cave Gardens
- Cliefden Caves
- Cloggs Cave
- Devil's Lair
- Drovers Cave National Park
- Engelbrecht Cave
- Exit Cave
- Fireclay Caverns
- Fossil Cave
- Gunns Plains Cave
- Hastings Caves State Reserve
- Hermit's Cave
- Hippo's Yawn
- Jenolan Caves
- Koonalda Cave
- Koongine Cave
- Kutikina Cave
- London Bridge
- Mammoth Cave
- Mermaids Cave
- Moondyne Cave
- Mount Etna Caves National Park
- Murrawijinie Cave
- Naracoorte Caves
- New Guinea II cave
- Niggly Cave
- Ngilgi Cave
- Old Homestead Cave
- Pindar Cave
- Princess Margaret Rose Cave
- Punyelroo Cave
- St Michaels Cave
- Tarragal Caves
- Tjunti
- Wellington Caves
- Willi Willi Caves
- Wombeyan Caves
- Wyanbene Caves
- Yarrangobilly Caves

=== Cook Islands ===
- Anatakitaki Cave
- To'uri Cave
- Vaitaongo Cave

=== Federal States of Micronesia ===
- Tonotan Guns and Caves

=== Guam ===
- Mahlac Pictograph Cave
- Talagi Pictograph Cave
- Yokoi's Cave

=== Nauru ===
- Moqua Caves

=== New Caledonia ===
- Pindai Caves

=== New Zealand ===
- Aurora Cave
- Broken River Cave
- Bulmer Cavern
- Cathedral Caves
- Clifden Limestone Caves
- Cracroft Caverns
- Ellis Basin cave system
- Gardner's Gut
- Harwoods Hole
- Honeycomb Hill Cave
- Metro Cave / Te Ananui Cave
- Moncks Cave
- Nettlebed Cave
- Ngārua Caves
- Rawhiti Cave
- Riuwaka Resurgence
- Ruakuri Cave
- Te Ana-au Caves
- Waitomo Caves
- Waitomo Glowworm Caves
- Wiri Lava Cave

=== Papua New Guinea ===
- Afawa Cave
- Atea Cave
- Diu Diu Cave
- Kilu Cave
- Tawali Skull Cave

=== Samoa ===
- Falemauga Caves

=== Tuvalu ===
- Caves of Nanumanga

=== Vanuatu ===
- Yeyenwu
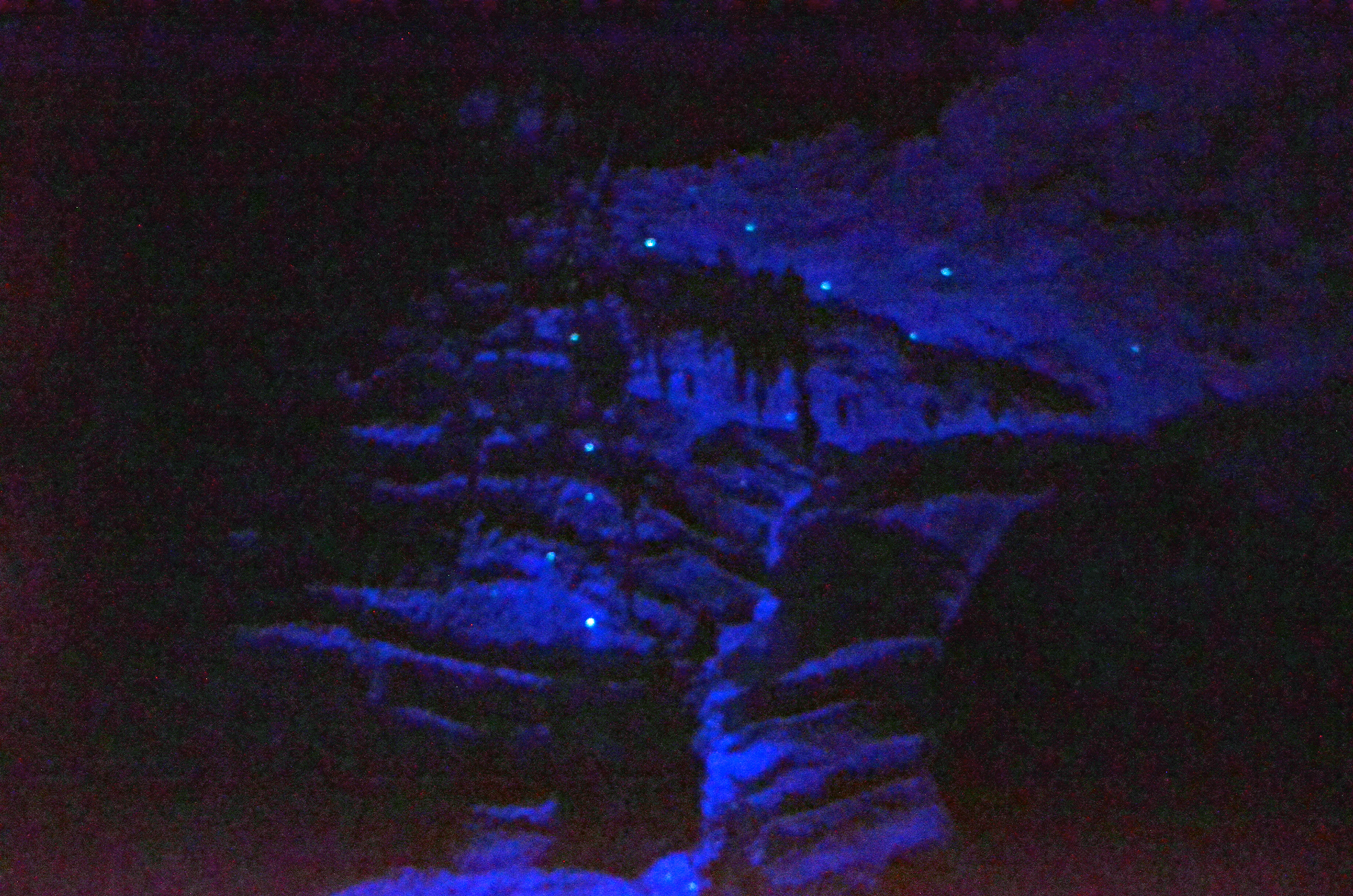
Waitomo Glowworm Cave.

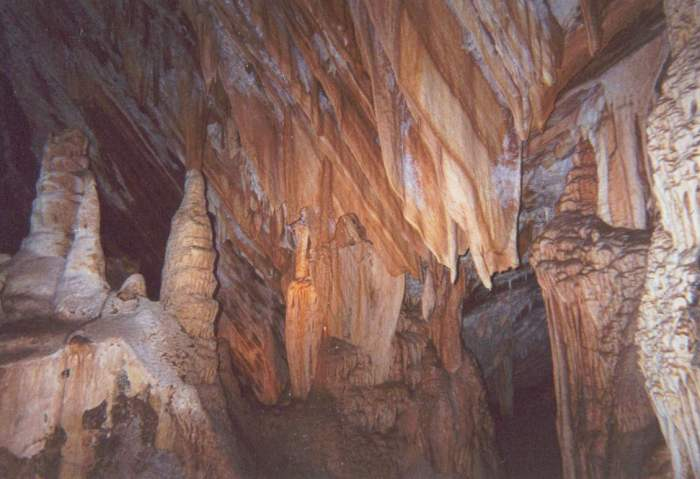
Jenolan Caves.

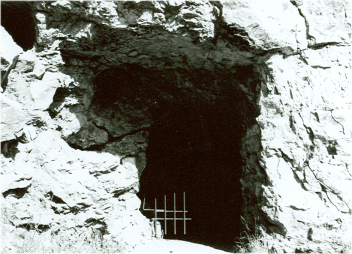
Jewel Cave Historic Entrance.

== Moon ==
The first atlas of lunar pits was published in 2021, and a number of catalogues have been published beginning in 2014.

== Mars ==
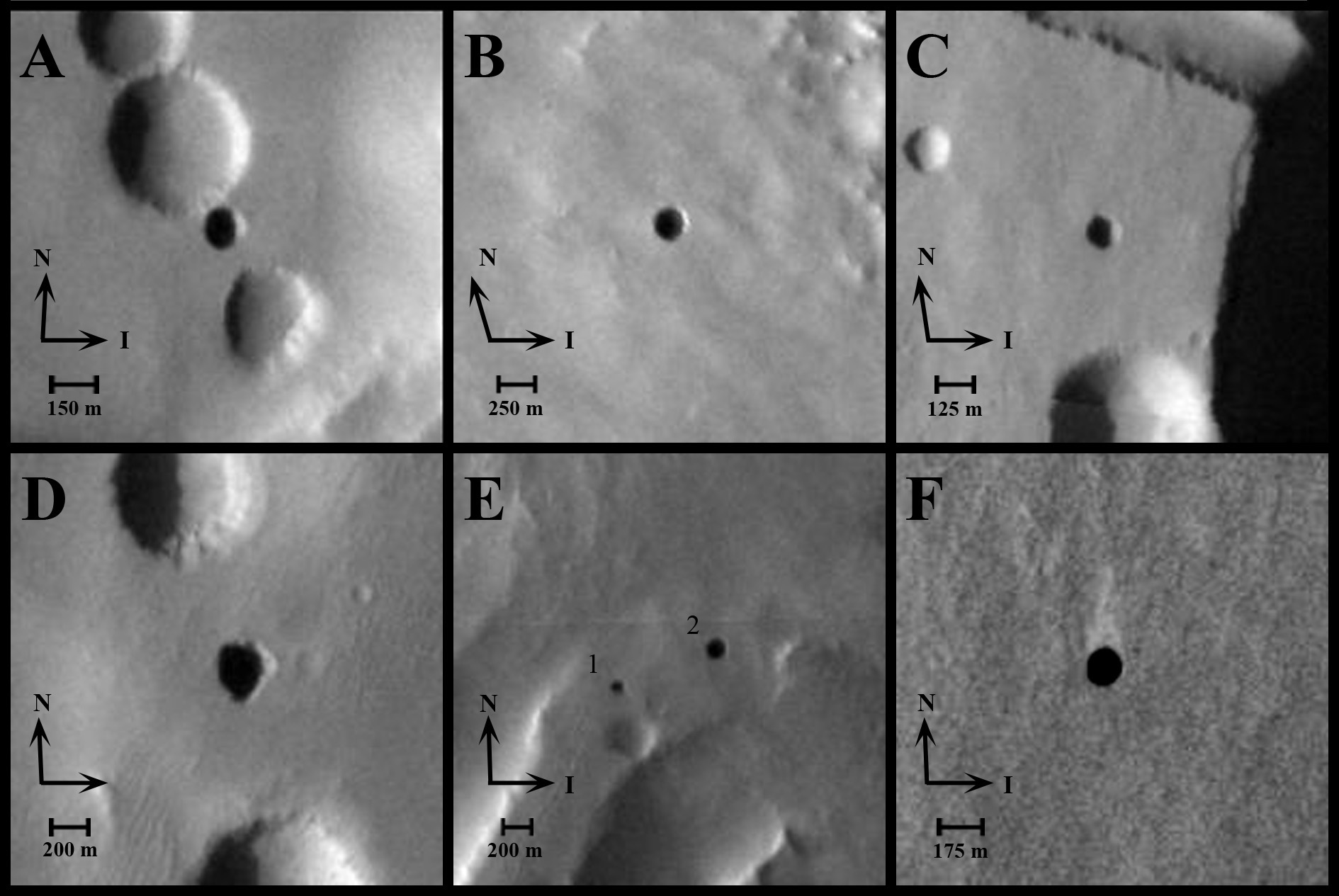
Possible cave entrances on Mars. The pits have been informally named (A) Dena, (B) Chloe, (C) Wendy, (D) Annie, (E) Abby (left) and Nikki, and (F) Jeanne.

As of 2007 seven putative cave entrances have been identified in satellite imagery of the planet Mars, all so far located on the flanks of Arsia Mons. A more recent photograph of one of the features shows sunlight illuminating a side wall, suggesting that it may simply be a vertical pit rather than an entrance to a larger underground space.

== See also ==
- List of deepest caves
- List of longest caves
- List of longest cave by country
- Show cave
- Speleology
