= Naresuan Cave =

Cave in Thailand

Coordinates: 16.5047°N 100.6624°E

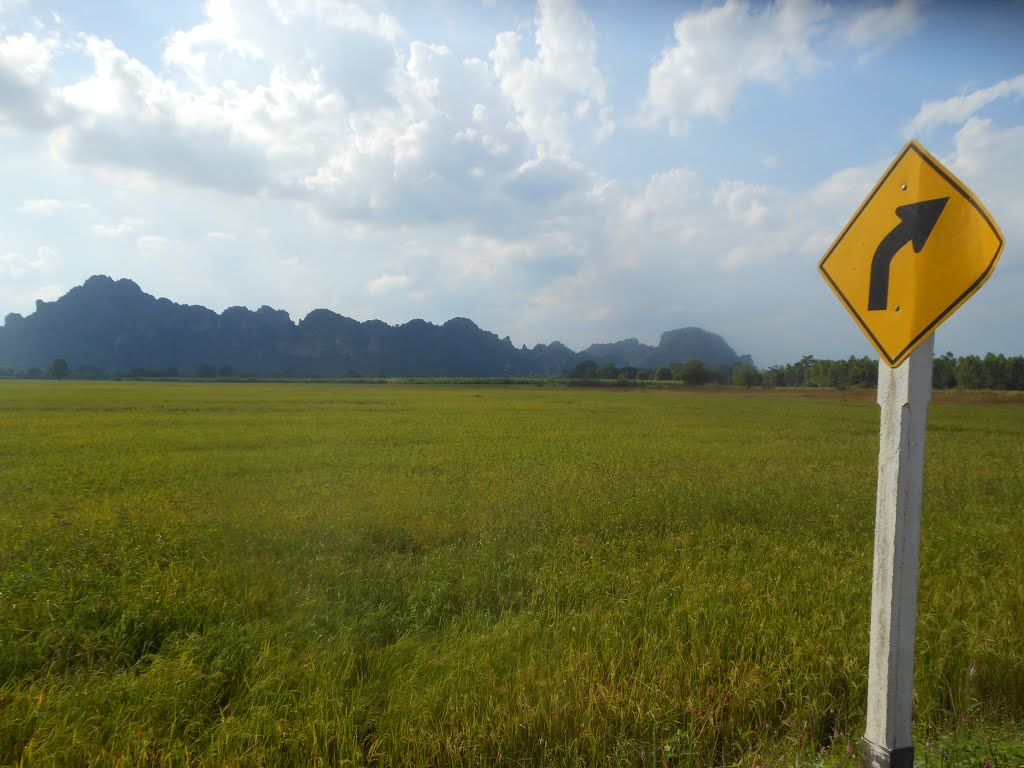
Thai road sign Tham Naresuan

Naresuan Cave (Thai: ถ้ำนเรศวร) is a pit cave within the Noen Maprang District of Phitsanulok Province, Thailand. Inside this cave, there is a descending limestone which looks like the Royal Helmet of King Naresuan, hence the cave's name. Descending and ascending limestone in this cave is very beautiful and strange-looking. The cave is very challenging for adventurers because its entry to the ascending and descending limestone hall is rather difficult. Those who want to enter will have to crawl on their knees one by one. There is also little fresh air inside. Therefore, no more than 10 persons are permitted to go inside at a time. Because Naresuan Cave has many beautiful ascending and descending limestone and stone pillars, as well as various kinds of bats, it was announced to be a Reserved Local Natural Heritage in the Nature and Environment Protection Year on 7 November 1989.

== See also ==
- List of caves
- Speleology
