= Sofular Cave =

Cave in Turkey

Coordinates: 41.44684°N 31.96463°E

Sofular Cave (Turkish: Sofular Mağarası) is a cave located north of Sofular village of Zonguldak Province, northern Turkey. This cave is only for cavers, there is a lot of climbing involved. The cave is a geosite of the Geopark and there is an educational sign outside, the cave on the other hand is not accessible.
