= Lokale =

Lokale Cave is a cave in Papua, Indonesia. The cave is in the village Lokale Woslimo, Baliem Valley, Jayawijaya, Papua.

Baliem Valley is best known as the residence of Dani, 20 kilometers from the Wamena. Papuan society believes that Lokale cave is the longest cave in the world, because its end has not been found. So far, the journey into the cave has reached 3 km.
