= Grotta dell'Arsenale =

Cave in Italy

The Grotta dell'Arsenale is a cave on the island of Capri, southern Italy.

It may have been used in the time of Roman emperor Tiberius as a depot for naval stores. It measures 4 m long by 3.5 wide by 1.5 m high. Excavations made in 1777 in the shingle, which still covers the floor to a depth of from 1.2 to 1.5 m, showed evidence of traces in the walls of two or three rooms which were of Roman workmanship, along with a floor of coloured marbles and some iron fragments, which have been identified as part of the plant of the ancient naval station, or perhaps of a Roman galley. Although the floor of the cave is 2.4 m above the sea, in southerly gales, waves hit it so forcefully as to render its use as a storehouse out of the question. The walls unearthed here indicate, therefore, that at the time they were built, this cave stood higher above the sea than it does at present.

The cave itself seems to have been formed by marine erosion when the land-level was at least 2.4 m lower than it is at present, at a period which must have been much prior to Roman times.
