= Harimau Cave =

Cave and archaeological site in Indonesia

- Tiger Cave
- location in Indonesia
- 0°35′23″N 101°20′35″E
- Location: Sumatra
- Region: Indonesia

Harimau Cave or Tiger Cave is a limestone cavern in the Indonesian island of Sumatra where the island's first known rock art has been discovered. The cave also held 66 skeletons of farmers from 3,000 years ago.

== Archaeology ==
Archaeologist Harry Truman Simanjuntak discovered the first known examples of rock art and the remains of 66 people as well as the bones of pigs, dogs and chickens, dated to 3,000 years BP, in Gua Harimau ('Tiger Cave'). Tools were manufactured at the same site. The number of skeletons is the largest so far found in a single cave in Indonesia.
