= Maharani Cave =

Maharani Cave is a phosphate mining cave located at Paciran, a district of Lamongan, Indonesia. At depth 25 meters (82 ft), the cave has 2,500 square metres (27,000 sq ft) wide underground area.
