= Macahambus Cave =

Coordinates: 8.7500°N 125.0000°E

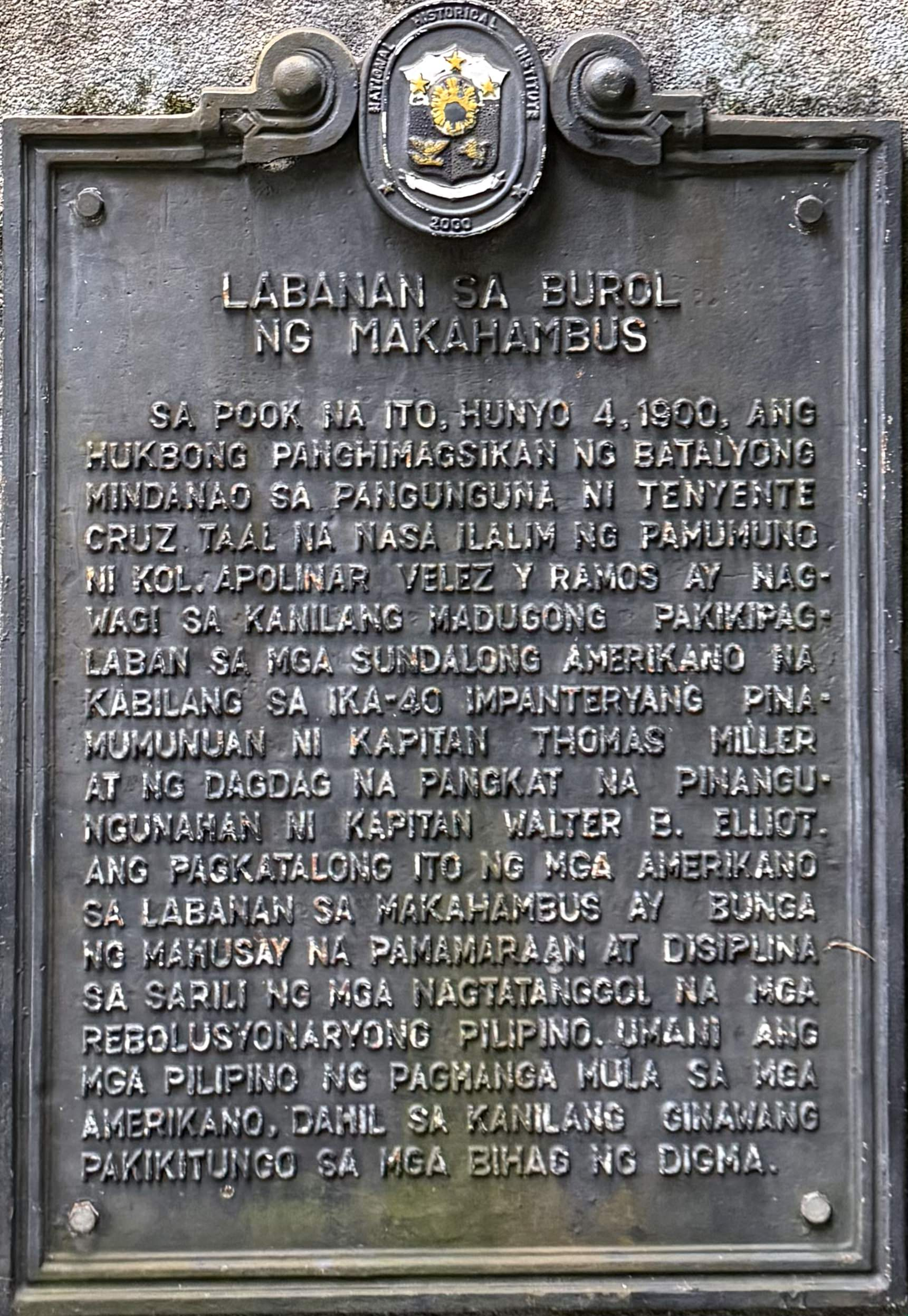
National historical marker commemorating the Battle of Makahambus Hill that occurred near the cave in 1900

Macahambus Cave is a scenic cave in the Misamis Oriental province, part of Cagayan de Oro, in the Philippines. The area of the cave is part of the tropical Macahambus Forest nature reserve.

The cave, which houses a colony of bats, is a tourist attraction, and it is equipped with path and walkable scenic trails; one end of the cave leads to a veranda overlooking the Cagayan River. About 200 meters (660 ft) from the cave itself there is a doline, improperly referred to as the Macahambus Gorge.

The place was the site of the Battle of Makahambus Hill (4 June 1900), the first of the few battles won by the Filipinos during the Philippine–American War.

The Filipino troops in Macahambus were led by Lt. Cruz Taal and Col. Apolinar Velez.
