= Ilıksu Cave =

Cave in Zonguldak, Turkey

Coordinates: 41°23′49″N 31°46′42″E

Ilıksu Cave (Turkish: Ilıksu Mağarası) is a cave located in Ilıksu, Zonguldak Province, northern Turkey.
