= Adiangao Cave =

Caves in the Philippines

Adiangao Cave is located in the barangay of Adiangao, San Jose, Camarines Sur. The inner part of the cave reveals a chain of grottoes in an enormous column, as well as numerous stalactites and stalagmites, both along the floor and ceiling which formed like drip-stones or semblance of icicles, and the hanging waterfalls.
