= Scurati Caves =

The Scurati Caves
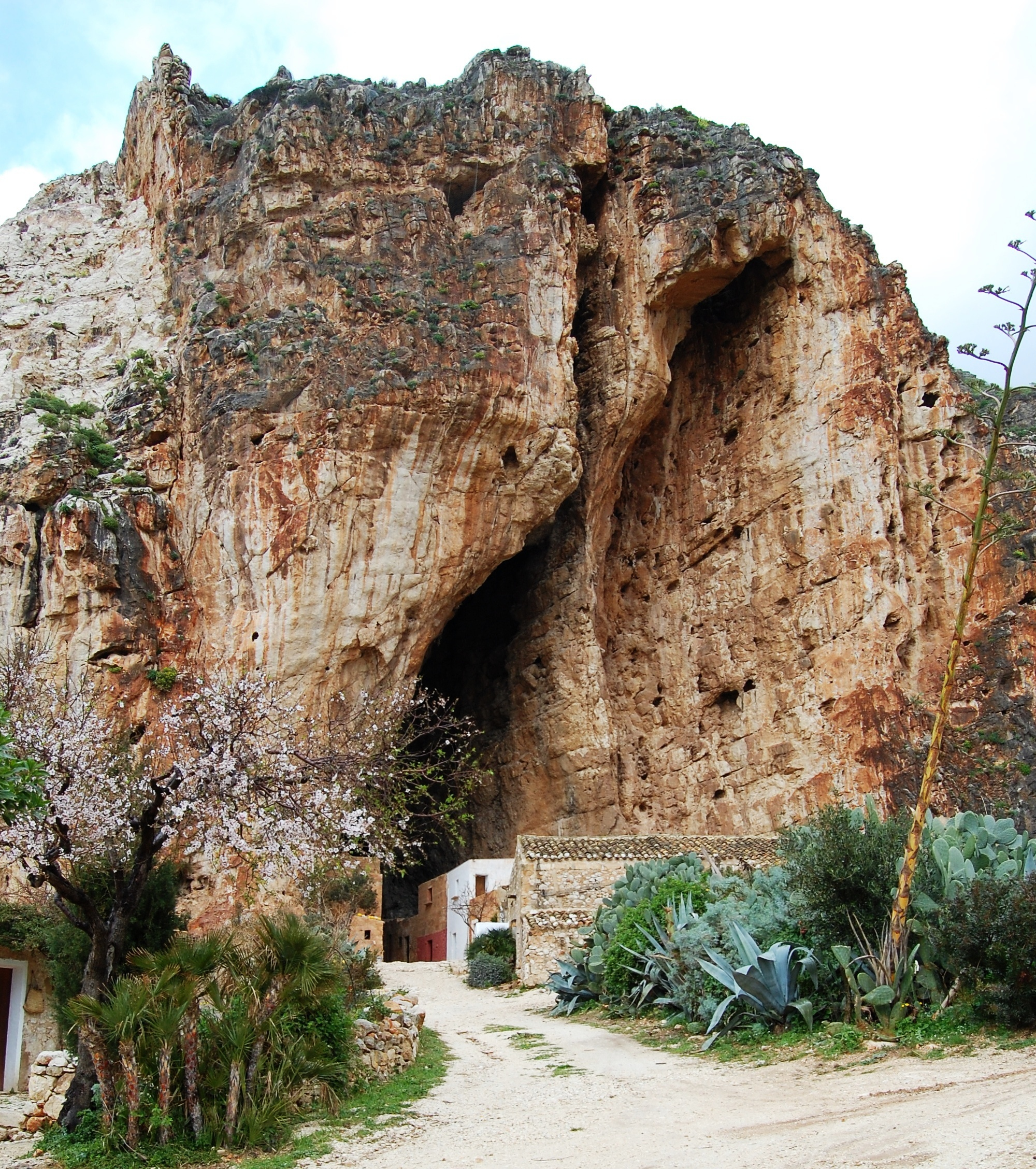
- Interactive map of The Scurati Caves
- Location: Italy
- Coordinates: 38.0933°N 12.6709°E

The Scurati Caves (also known as Grotte di Scurati or Grotta Mangiapane) are an ancient settlement and a speleological geological site located in the municipality of Custonaci, in the province of Trapani (Italy). It includes a small village of houses that have been inhabited from 1819 until mid-1900s. The site includes a total of nine caves. The largest cave is the Mangiapane cave, which is about 70 meters high, 13 wide and 50 deep. Numerous ancient findings have been found in the site including rock paintings.
