= Sugomak Cave =

Cave in Russia

Coordinates: 55°42′55″N 60°27′35″E

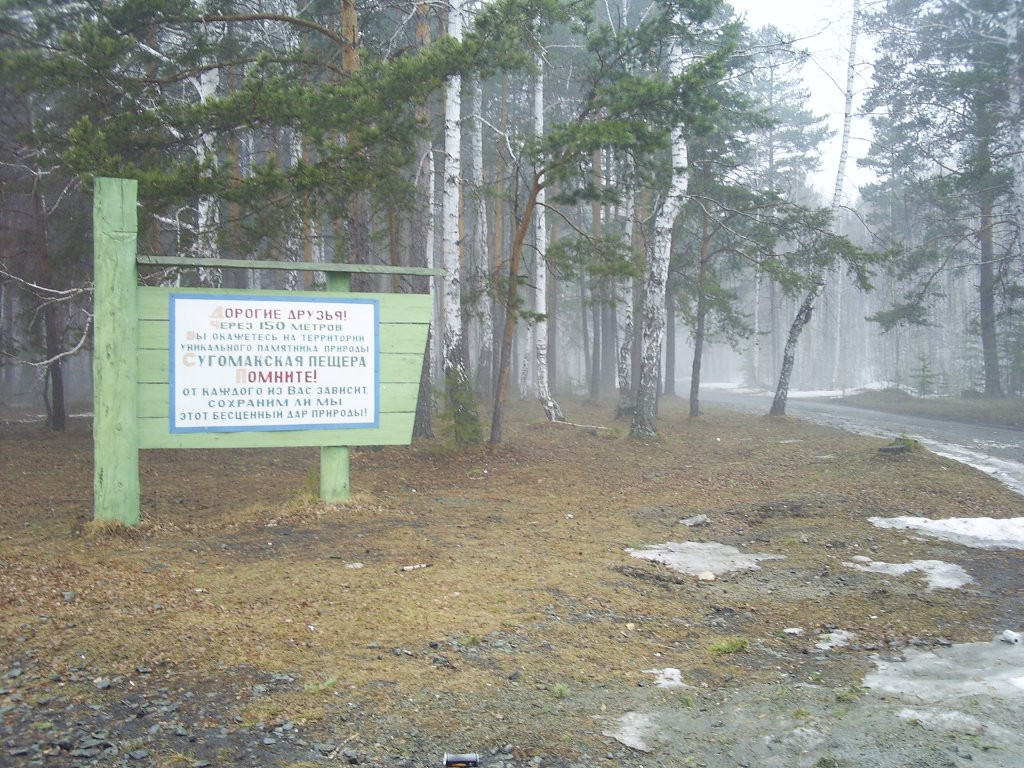
The sign on the way to the cave reads: "Dear friends, in 150 metres you will be on the territory of a unique monument of nature, the Sugomak Cave..."

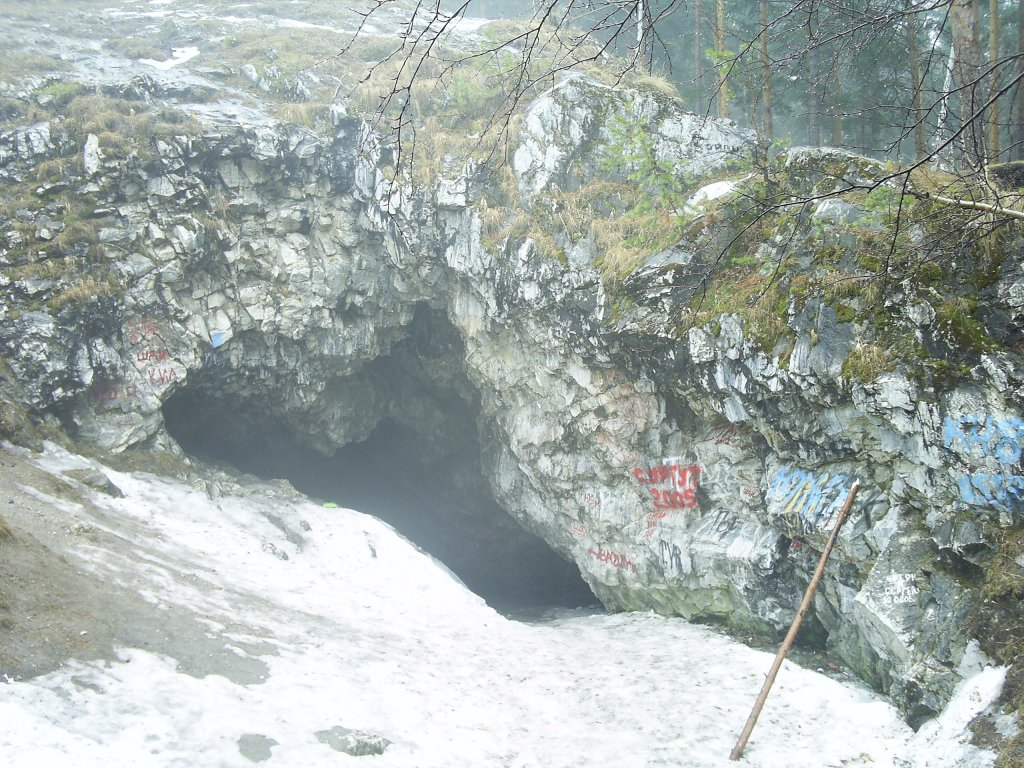
The entrance to the cave, vandalized by visitors painting their names

Sugomak Cave (Russian: Сугомакская пещера) is located in Ural, on the east slope of the Sugomak Mountain near the town of Kyshtym. The Sugomak Cave is the only cavity in Ural developed in marble by water. It is the main local sight and represents a cavity consisting of three grottos which are connected by narrow passages. The third grotto is partially filled by water.

The members of "Kosmopoisk", by means of echo-sounding, have found under the thick silt at least three strange objects. The origin of the discoid objects lying up to 8 meters deep is not clear. Under the water there are the flooded courses leading, most likely, to new areas of the cave.
