= Cueva del Diablo =

Cave in Bolivia

- The Devil's Cave
- Interactive map of Cueva del Diablo
- Location: La Puerta, Bolivia, 6km east of Potosí
- Depth: unknown
- Length: unknown

Cueva del Diablo, or The Devil's Cave, is a karst cave located 6 km (3.7 mi) east of Potosí, Bolivia. The Chapel of San Bartolomé lies right above the site. The cave is located at the bottom of a steep, 100m ravine. The cave's name is derived from a dark streak in the rocks outside the cave's entrance; legend tells that the mark was left by Lucifer as he was fleeing an image of St. Bartholomew. In 1737, Bartholomew Arzáns de Orsúa y Vela described the ravine and its "demonic presence". The Jesuits are said to have expelled the devil from the ravine and the cave by carving an image of the saint on the rocks outside the cave mouth.
