= Anou Achra Lemoun =

Cave of Djurdjura in Algeria

Anou Achra Lemoun is a cave of Djurdjura in Algeria. It has a length of 323 metres (1,060 ft).
