= Mussard Cave =

Mountain cave on the island of Réunion

- Caverne Mussard
- Location within Réunion
- Location: La Réunion
- Coordinates: 21°05′42″S 55°30′42″E
- Elevation: 2,157 m (7,077 ft)
- Discovery: 18th century (Maroon)

The Mussard Cave (French: Caverne Mussard) is a mountain cave on the island of Réunion. Located about 2150 meters above sea level in the heart of the Piton des Neiges (Mountain range), it falls within the municipality of Saint-Benoit. It is named after the slave hunter François Mussard, who have killed and captured a lot of Maroons in the mid eighteenth century.
