= İnağzı Cave =

Cave in northern Turkey

Coordinates: 41°28′17″N 31°49′42″E

İnağzı Cave (Turkish: İnağzı Mağarası) is a cave located in Zonguldak, northern Turkey.
