= Landmannahellir =

Cave in Iceland

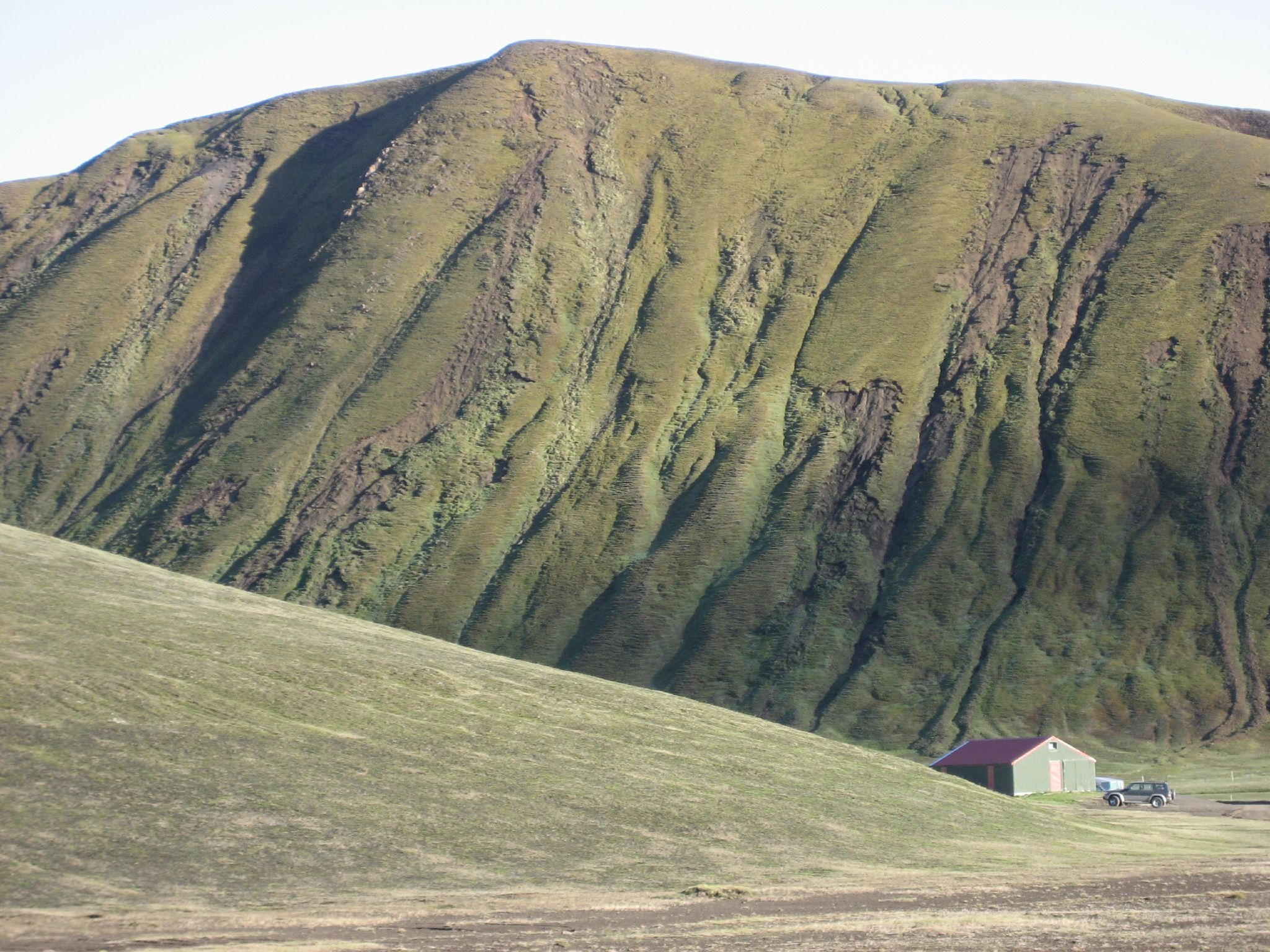
- Moss covered land around Landmannahellir

- Location within Iceland
- Coordinates: 64°03′N 19°14′W
- Depth: 8 m
- Length: 14 m
- Website: www.landmannahellir.is

Landmannahellir (Icelandic pronunciation: [ˈlantˌmanːaˌhɛtlɪr̥]) is a small cave at the foot of the Hellisfjall mountain middle of Suðurland (South Iceland) in the influence area of the volcano Hekla.

Landmannahellir is 14 metres (46 ft) long, 8 m (26 ft) wide and has a 4 m (13 ft) ceiling. It used to be a shelter for farmers with their sheep. Today it serves tourism. A few huts were built near the cave.

== Next to Landmannahellir ==
- Löðmundur mountain in the north
- Löðmundarvatn lake in the east
- Landmannaleið trail
