= Vaitaongo Cave =

Karst cave in the Cook Islands

Vai Tango
- Interactive map of Vai Tango
- Coordinates: 20°8′47.84″S 157°20′29.23″W
- Length: 100m

Vai Tango Cave is a karst cave located a short distance from Ngatiarua Village, on the island of Mauke in the Cook Islands. The cave is a cenote cave with overhanging stalactites and a deep pool used for swimming. The pool extends more than 100 metres (330 ft) back and 50 metres (160 ft) across.
