= Actún Can =

Actún Can Cave
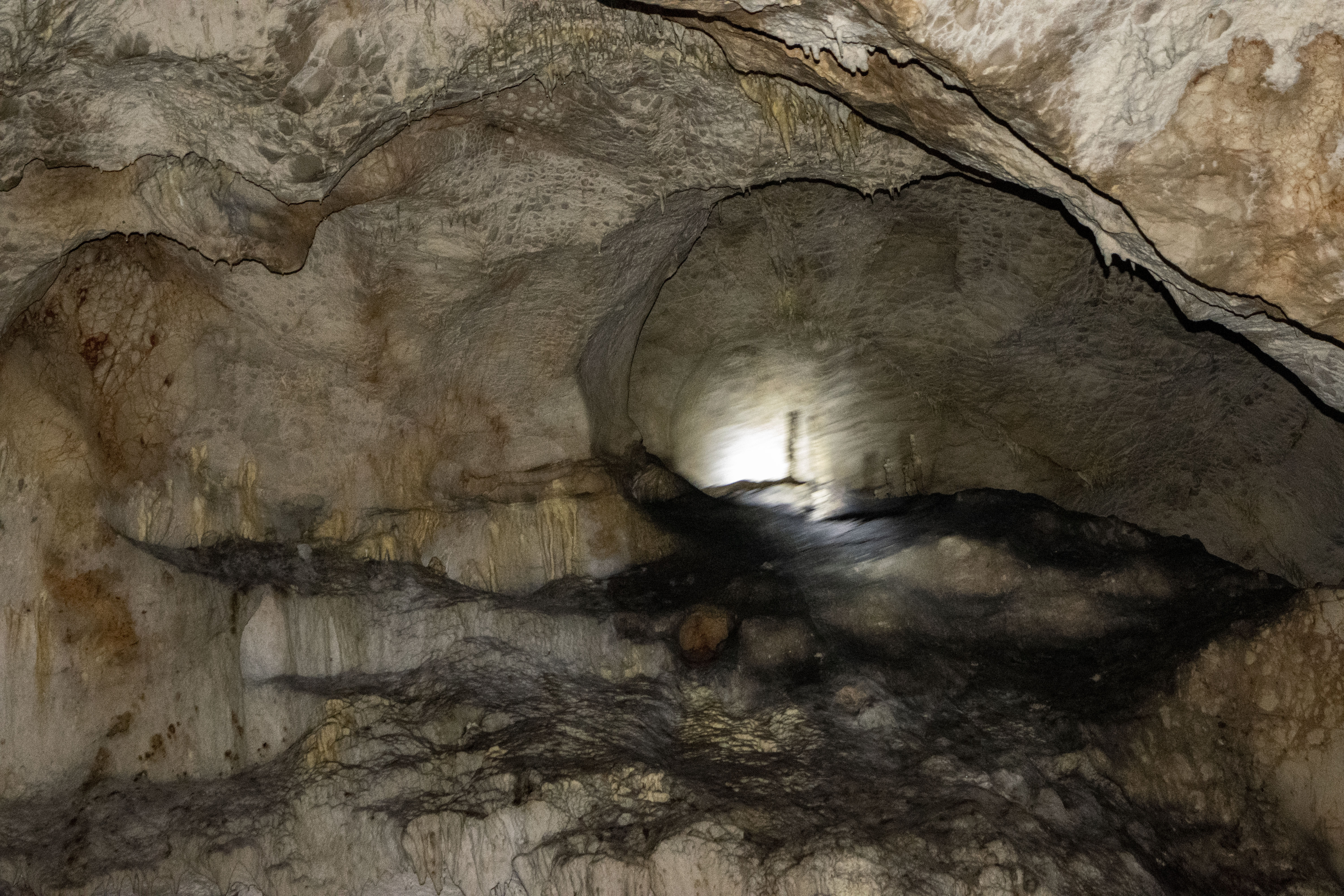
- Actún Can Cave
- Interactive map of Actún Can Cave
- Location: Flores (Guatemala)
- Coordinates: 17°54′11″N 89°53′56″W
- Discovery: 9
- Geology: Karst
- Difficulty: 10

Actún Can is a natural cave in the municipality of Flores in Guatemala. The cave entrance is located just south of the town of Santa Elena. The cave is connected to the Jobitzinaj cave. Its name in mayan means "snake rock" or "snake cave".
