= Barry Troglodyte Village =

Archaeological site in France

Coordinates: 44.3161°N 4.7565°E

The Barry Troglodyte Village is an archaeological site near Bollène, northwestern Vaucluse, France. It is located on a forested hill that overlooks the Rhône valley. A group of caves and stone buildings comprise an ancient village that is historically interesting because it was inhabited continuously from the neolithic until the early 20th century. Most remaining buildings date from the 17th until the 19th century, including a chapel from 1706 that was partly built in a cave.
