= Tawali Skull Cave =

Cave in Papua New Guinea

Skull Cave
- Location: near Bilubilu, Alotau, Milne Bay Province, Papua New Guinea

Tawali Skull Cave is a karst cave located near Bilubilu, Alotau, Milne Bay Province, Papua New Guinea. The cave receives its name from an ancient native practice: when revered or beloved people die, they would be buried upright with a clay pot placed over their head. When the head was able to be separated from the rest of the skeleton, the skull was taken and lain in the cave as a show of respect. Many such "skull caves" exist throughout the country. The cave is located near East Cape, the country's easternmost mainland point. The entrance and descent is rickety and tough to negotiate, and the path leading to the cave is dense, so a guide is necessary to access the cave.
