= Olentangy Indian Caverns =

Cave in Ohio, USA

Coordinates: 40°11′32″N 83°03′44″W

The Olentangy Caverns are a series of caves, natural passages and rooms in Delaware, Ohio, occupying three different levels. The caverns were formed millions of years ago by an underground river that cut through the limestone rock. They were used by the Wyandotte Indians as a refuge from the weather and from their enemies the Delaware Indians. Artifacts found in the caverns indicate that it was used by the Wyandotte as late as 1810. The Olentangy Caverns are located at 1779 Home Road, and are open seasonally for self-guided tours.

== History ==
The caverns were formed millions of years ago by the dissolution of limestone from an underground river. The caverns are believed to have been used by the Wyandotte Indians. The caverns were rediscovered in 1821 by J.M. Adams, a nearby camper, who was a member of a wagon train. He carved his initials in the entrance, where they can still be seen today. The caverns include many openings and passages, and have not been fully explored.
