= Bantay Abot Cave =

Natural rock formation in Philippines

Coordinates: 18.6147°N 120.8695°E

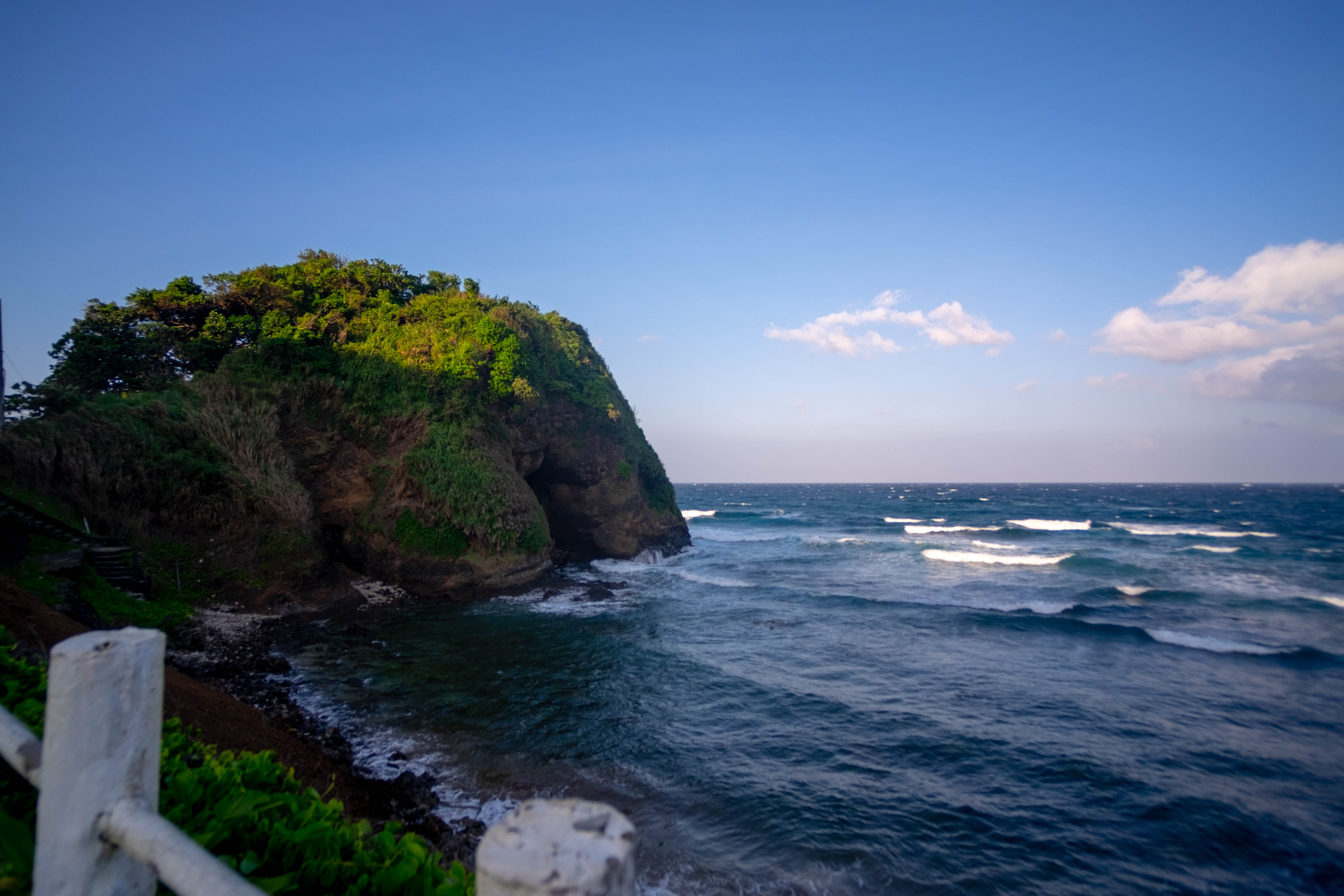
Bantay Abot Cave Pagudpud, Ilocos Norte

Bantay Abot Cave is a natural rock formation and tourist attraction along the shores of Balaoi, Pagudpud, Ilocos Norte.

Despite being called a cave, Bantay Abot means "mountain with a hole". This cave-like rock archway that frames a rocky shore is believed to have been a hill that eroded over time after an earthquake struck.

It faces the South China Sea, and is a few kilometers away from Kabigan Falls and Patapat Viaduct.

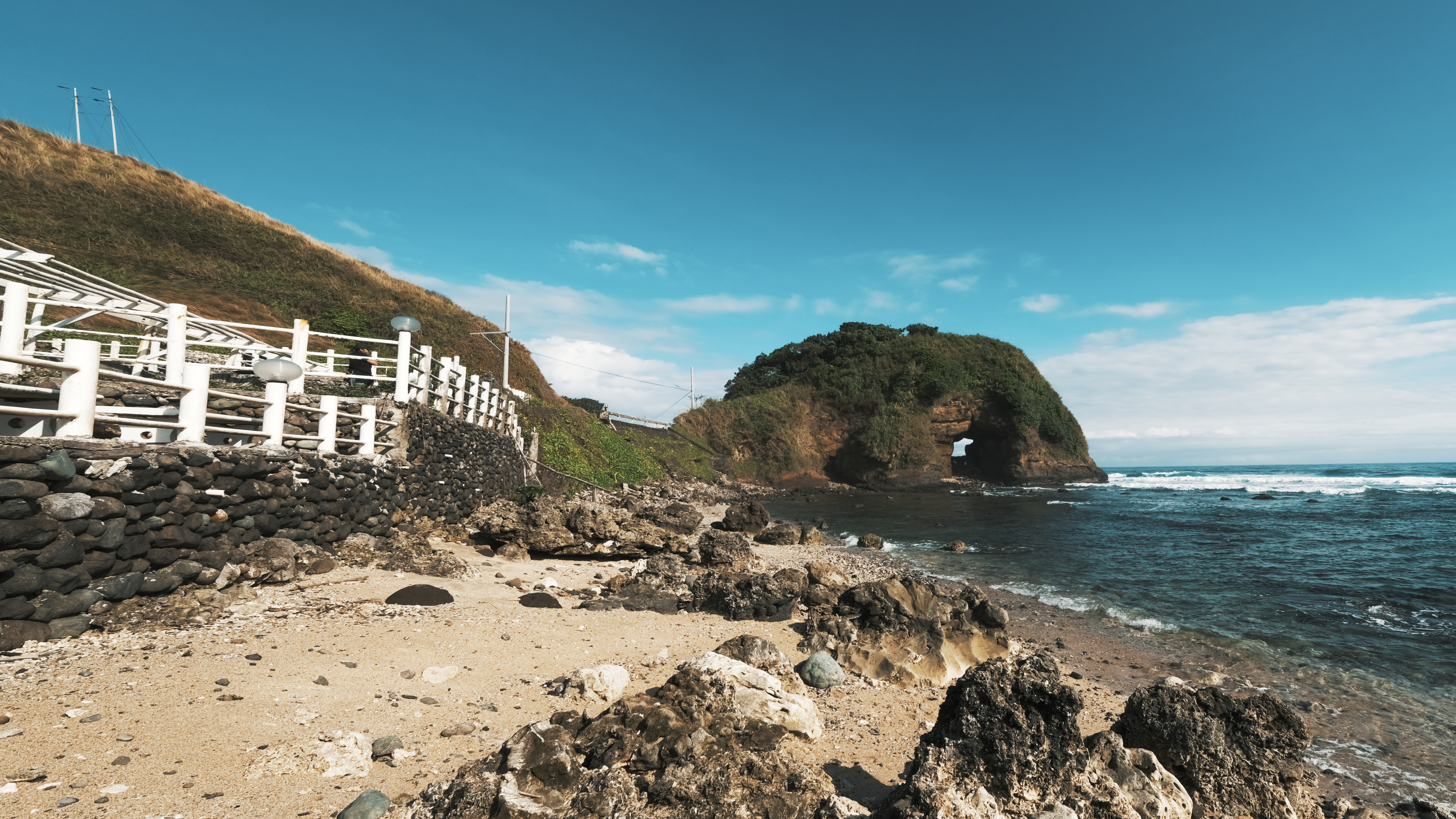
Bantay Abot Cave Shoreline
