= Biocyclone Cave =

Biocyclone Cave is a cave in Gunung Buda National Park, Sarawak, Malaysia. The cave has a 100-metre (330 ft) wide entrance. Its length is 2,278 metres (7,474 ft), with a vertical range of 152 metres (499 ft). It was first explored and surveyed by an American expedition in 1995.
