= Yeyenwu =

- Yöyen Wu
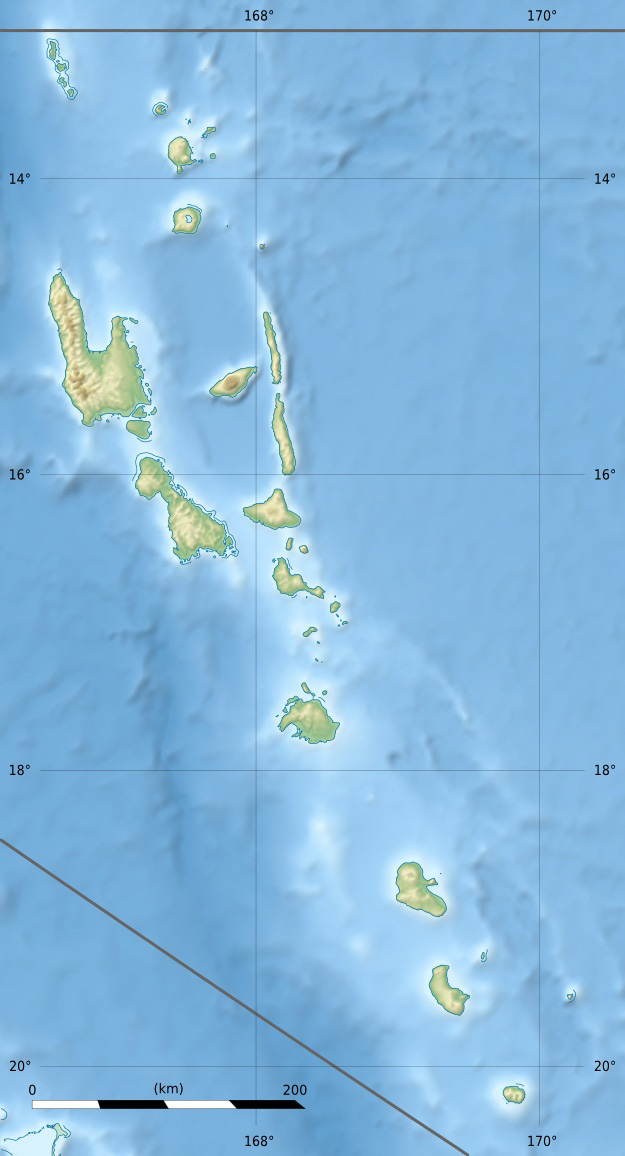
- Location within Vanuatu
- Interactive map of Yeyenwu
- Location: Vanuatu
- Coordinates: 13°08′S 166°34′E

Yeyenwu is a cave in Hiw, the northernmost island of Vanuatu. It has some notable stalactite formations.

In the local language, the name Yöyen Wu [jɵjənˈwʉ] translates as "the cave of Spirits".
