= Akbaur Cave =

Bronze Age site in Kazakhstan

Coordinates: 49°40′32.3″N 82°41′14.2″E

Akbaur Cave (Kazakh: Ақбауыр үңгірі, Aqbaýyr úńgiri) is a Bronze Age monument located in the Ukan region of East Kazakhstan. The site is 3 km north of Besterek aul, on the piedmont of Akbaur Mountain. The cave is about 5–6 m above the piedmont of the mountain.

Paintings on the cave walls were drawn in brown ocher, dating to approximately 3000 BC. The content of the paintings is complex, and includes shapes such as triangles and rectangles, lines, dots, and sketches of people.

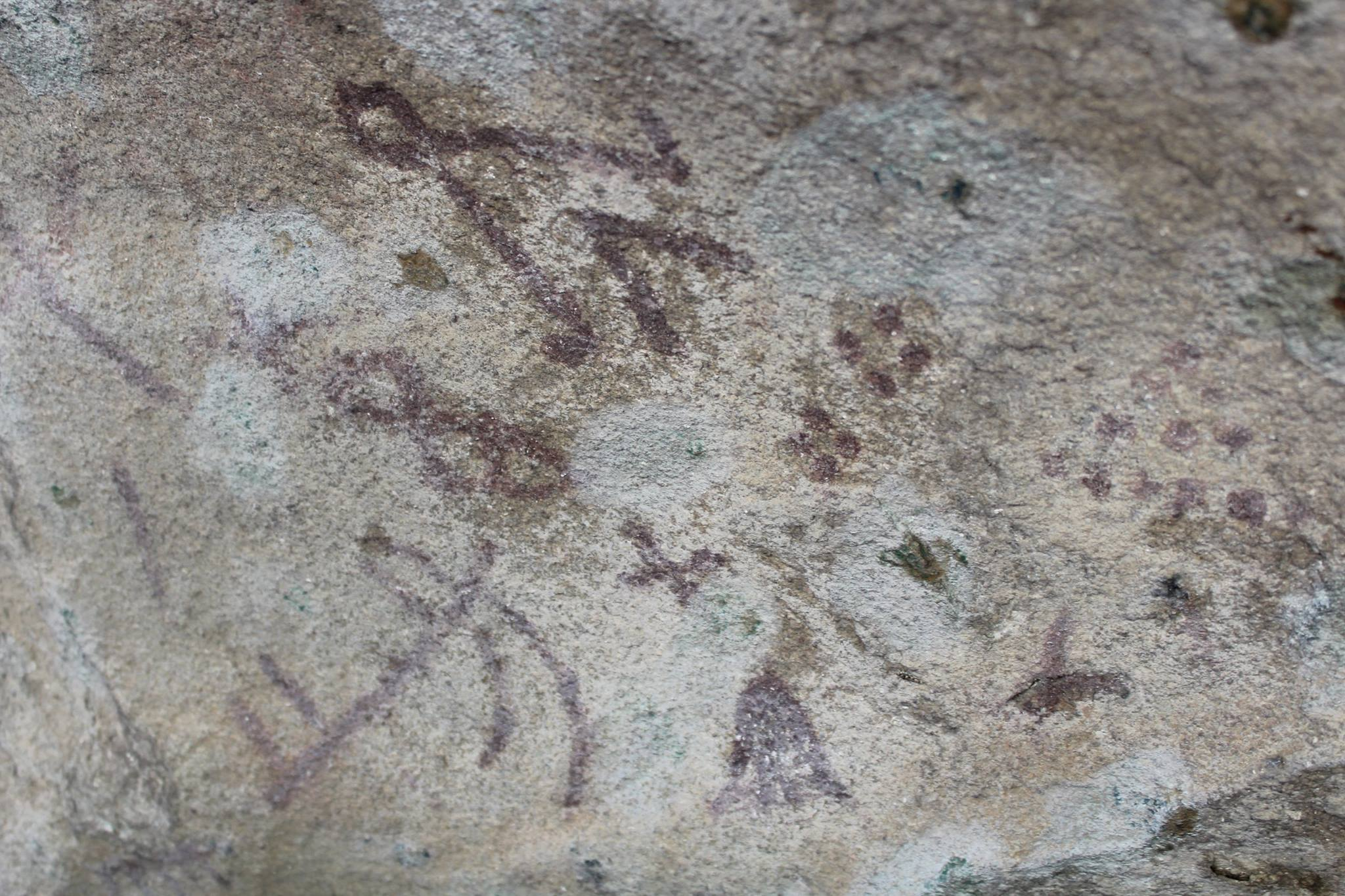
The drawings on the walls of the cave

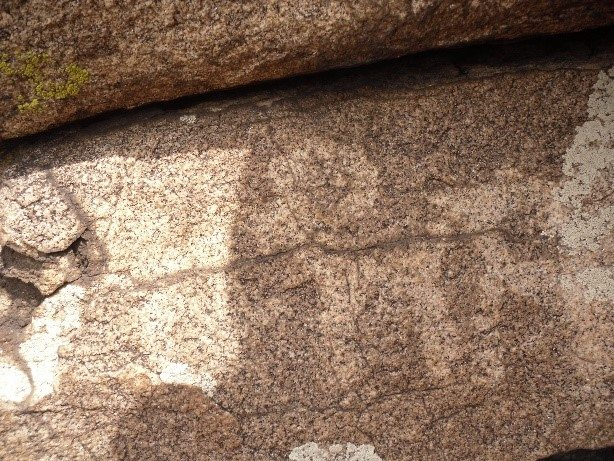
The drawings on the walls of the Akbaur Cave

It is one of the most ancient famous temples of the Neolithic Age, called Kazakh’s Stonehenge. By ancient beliefs, Akbaur Cave was the centre of the world.

== Points of scientists ==
Zeinolla Samashev: We found settlement of the Bronze Age’s final and the Iron Age’s start on the first layer. Stone grain graters, whetstones, bones of horses and sheep are showing that nomad Saka had also settled lifestyle. Archeologists guess that there was developed agriculture, they handled stones, weaved clothes, burnt ceramics and made iron instruments. In 2019 we started excavation of one area near the cave and discovered a stationary settlement of the early Saka period.

== Theories about Akbaur Cave’s appointment ==
Theory 1: Temple under sky, oriented to West, was used for funeral rites, sacrifice. Rites which were near Akbaur Cave and mountain Kyzyl tas, connected with cult of mountains, one of ancient magic cults, such as cults of sky, sun, rain, animals and plants. Scientists came to the conclusion, that rings of stones were places for religious rites and other stones were alleys for ritual processions. Nearly 100 metres from wall we notice a big stone, which looks like a mushroom. Scientists think that this rock was an altar.

Theory 2: Ancient observatory from where ancient people made systematic observations of celestial bodies, because there were discovered fundaments of ancient buildings, an area with sun alarm and astronomic laboratory with granite slabs that have astro grids information and looks like an amphitheater with a diameter of 25 m and granite slabs with strength 2.5–4 m. It is possible that on stone “benches” were a sitting audience staring at actions of astronomers, the Neolithic and the Bronze Age’s people, that were observing the Sun and Moon.

Theory 3: Unique rock text has information about global catastrophe, causing inaquasus and appearance of climate five-zone. Decoded cuneiform showed Ertis as landmark of saving way.

Theory 4: Cult of mountains was connected with fact that mountains are place of god’s location. They symbolized center of world, place of sky’s and Earth’s contact, eternity and striving for the summit world. Akbaur Cave – unique energetic and informational generator that has clearly limited polarity by sides of the horizon. There are two positive and two negative zones. It’s permanent informatic generator, that has already worked five thousand years. Information “comes” here and goes to the space.

== Cave drawings ==
There are 80 cave drawings and petroglyphs, which have no analog in Kazakhstan: drawings of human, mountain goat, bull, two-wheeled cart, settlements, others are symbols and signs. They were made by brown ohra and relate to three thousand years before the present era. Most of the drawings located in 90, 60 and 180 centimeters from each other. These drawings are unique for Kazakhstan, firstly they are drawn, not hollowed out on stone, secondly, not similar to ancient artists’ works. The logic of them is secret yet. However, there are some assumptions, such as, drawing of saving way, beginning of human’s write (E.Kurdakov), coming of aliens and map of the star sky.

Crosses are signs of Sun or stars, therefore it can be a map of star sky. It is not clear, but important for South-West orientation of sanctuary.

White and black deer, mountain goats could be part of sacrifice’s rites. Deer, which have sun on horns show their cosmic nature of this Eurasian’s nomad’s sacred beast. Beauty and power, its peaceful disposition and possibility of protection, big areal of subspecies and other characteristics affected on choice nomad’s deer as one of their symbol. Even names of people, lived at Scythian time in territory of Kazakhstan – “Saka”, some linguists translate as “deer”.

== Rocks and stones’ purposes ==
Semicircular space of cave covered by stone with hole like heart. By some versions, form has traces of processing by person, who was observing constellations.

Holes of unearthly nature. If you pour water to lower hole, on the day when day and night are equal it will be shown on highest hole. Maybe these holes are places of sacrifice or it is just exhibit of molten ore. Also, there were found ingots of ore with forms of holes. Additionally, there are blast furnace remains, some of them are small, there could be 1–2 people and others are giant. Jone Obry assumed that ancients guessed days of Sun and Moon’s eclipse.

From Hoil’s point, it's huge protractor. Following, ancients also mastered exact sciences, beside dimension of time and space.

== Description of route ==
Akbaur cave is located 38 kilometres from Oskemen. Leaving the city, drive along the Samar highway. Drive by Samsonovka aul and by turn of Sibin lakes and turn after two kilometres behind Sagyr aul (before – Leninka) near sign “Akbaur”.
