= Cumayanı Cave =

Cave in Turkey

Coordinates: 41.4966°N 31.9481°E

Cumayanı Cave (Turkish: Cumayanı Mağarası) is a cave located in Çatalağzı town of Zonguldak Province, northern Turkey.
