= Erçek Cave =

Show cave in northern Turkey

Coordinates: 41.4465°N 31.9174°E

Erçek Cave (Turkish: Erçek Mağarası) is a cave located in Zonguldak, northern Turkey.
