= Erravaram Caves =

Buddhist cave in Andra Pradesh, India

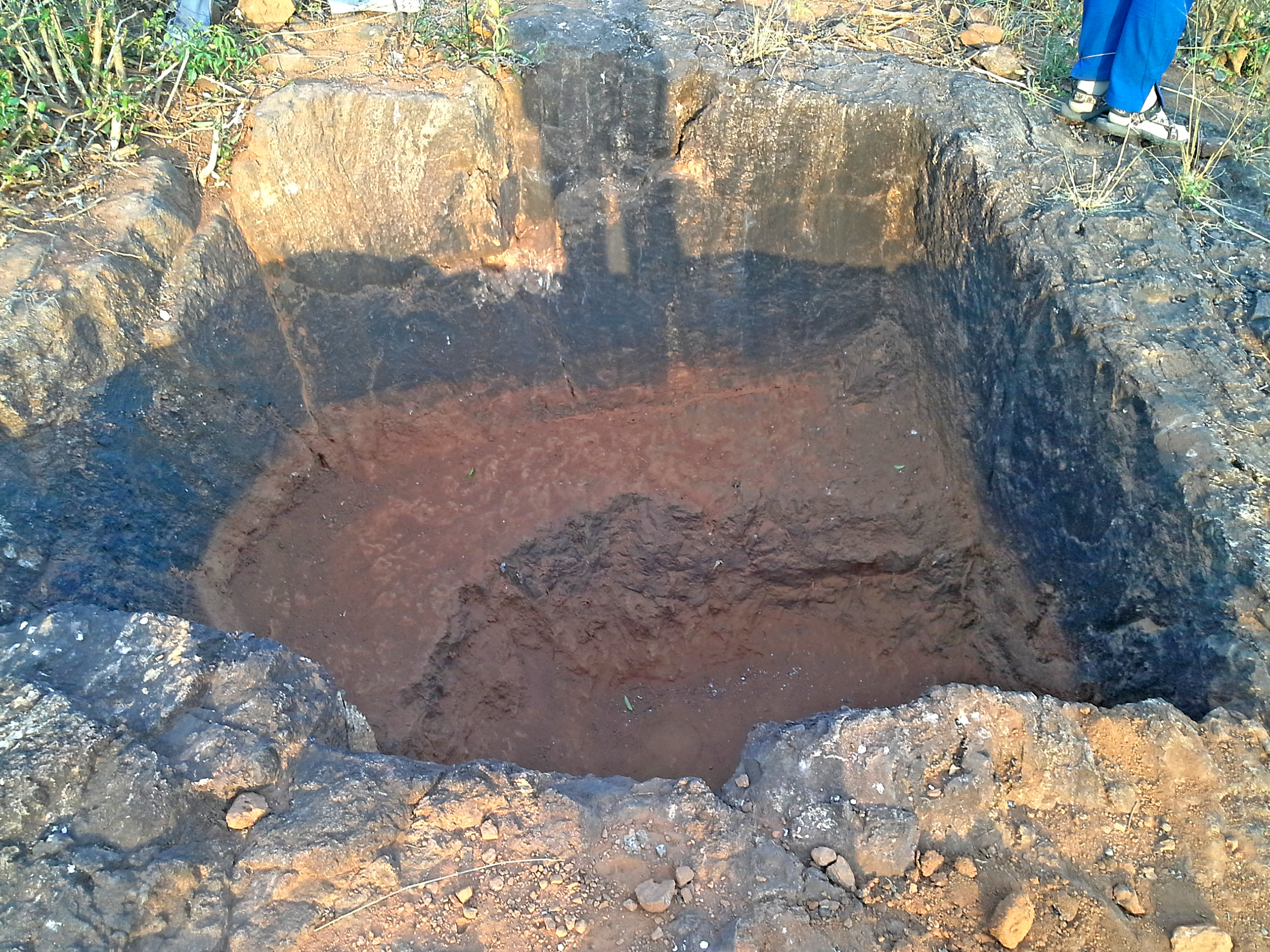
View of a rock cut cistern at Erravaram Buddhist ruins

Erravaram Caves are located on the left bank of Yeleru River, at a distance of 45 km from Rajahmundry on Vishakhapatnam route. The caves are located on the eastern side of Dhanaladibba hillock. The excavations revealed historic remains dated back to 100 A.D. This site flourished from 1st century B.C. to 2nd century A.D.
