= Byahaut Bat Cave =

Coordinates: 13°11′11″N 61°15′47″W

Byahaut Bat Cave is a coastal cave in the Caribbean Island of St. Vincent on the Western Coast.

The cave is a local landmark for boats organising diving and snorkeling trips for tourists.

The cave is believed to contain a large and noisy bat population.
