= Afawa Cave =

Karst cave in Papua New Guinea

- Location: Doe, Central Province

Afawa Cave is a karst cave located in Doe, Central Province, Papua New Guinea. It is very remote; the most common way to access the cave is by an 80 km, two-day trek. From Doe, it is a one-hour steep climb to reach the altitudinous cave, which is home to a large colony of flying foxes
