= List of bat roosts =

This is a list of places where there is a bat roost.

== Jamaica ==
- Belmont Cave
- Coffee River Cave
- Green Grotto Caves
- Oxford Cave, Jamaica
- Smokey Hole Cave
- Thatchfield Great Cave
- Windsor Great Cave

== United Kingdom ==
- Banwell Caves, Somerset, England
- Beer Quarry Caves, England
- Belle Vue Quarry, England
- Blaisdon Hall, England
- Box Mine, England
- Brockley Hall Stables, England
- Bryanston SSSI, Dorset, England
- Buckshraft Mine & Bradley Hill Railway Tunnel, England
- Caerwood and Ashberry Goose House, England
- Cheddar Gorge, Somerset, England
- Chedworth Nature Reserve, England
- Chilmark Quarries, England
- Combe Down and Bathampton Down Mines, Somerset, England
- Compton Martin Ochre Mine, Somerset, England
- Creech Grange, England
- Devil's Chapel Scowles, England
- Ebbor Gorge, Somerset, England
- Fonthill Grottoes, England
- Greywell Tunnel, England
- Hestercombe House, Somerset, England
- Iford Manor, England
- Littledean Hall, England
- Mother Ludlam's Cave, England
- Mottisfont Bats SSSI, England
- Old Bow and Old Ham Mines, England
- Old Iron Works, Mells, Somerset, England
- Paston Great Barn, England
- Perch SSSI, England
- Publow, England
- Rodney Stoke SSSI, England
- St. Dunstan's Well Catchment, Somerset, England
- Stembridge Mill, High Ham, Somerset, England
- Sylvan House Barn, England
- Tyntesfield, Somerset, England
- Westbury Brook Ironstone Mine, England
- Wharncliffe Viaduct, England
- Wigpool Ironstone Mine, England
- Winsley Mines, England
- Woodchester Mansion, England
- Boho Caves, Northern Ireland

== United States ==
- Ann W. Richards Congress Avenue Bridge
- Comfort, Texas
- Grandview Mine
- Hygieostatic Bat Roost
- Sugarloaf Key Bat Tower
- 100-F Clearwell - Hanford Site - Washington State
