= List of caves in Jamaica =

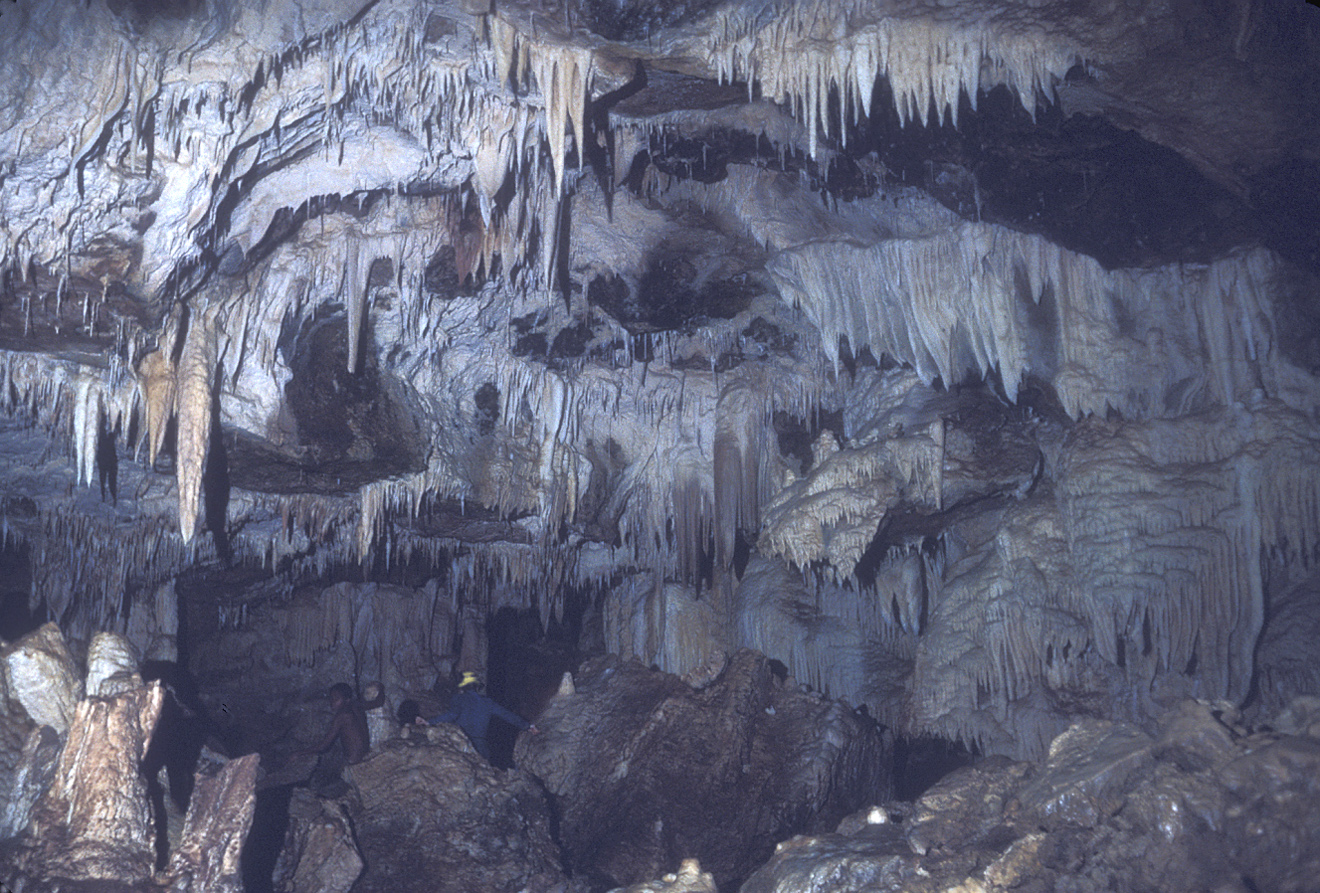
Formations in Coffee River Cave

This is a list of notable caves in Jamaica. There are over 1,000 cave systems in the island of Jamaica.

== Caves in Jamaica ==
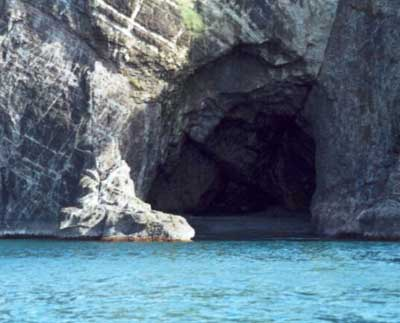
A cave at Xtabi

- Bad Hole Cave – an impressively large rising cave in the Cockpit Country of Jamaica. This is a limestone Karst region that is very rich in caves.
- Belmont Cave – also known as Drip Cave, it is a white limestone dry cave in the Cockpit Country of Jamaica
- Carambie Cave – a large, relatively dry, white limestone cave in Trelawny Parish
- Coffee River Cave – a large river cave in Manchester Parish in west-central Jamaica, it is 2,800 metres (9,200 ft) in length and at an elevation of 250 metres (820 ft).
- Dunn's Hole – a large chamber cave in Trelawny Parish, it consists of a very large chamber approximately 200 metres long, 100 metres wide and 80 metres high, located at the bottom of a 200-metre pit. It is the largest known underground chamber in Jamaica. The main chamber contains a large stalagmite approximately 8 metres high.
- Gourie Cave – a large river cave in Manchester Parish, at 3,505 metres it is the longest cave known in the island.
- Green Grotto Caves – show caves and a prominent tourist attraction on the north coast of Jamaica, the caves are named for the green algae that cover their walls.
- Hutchinson's Hole – a large sinkhole located in Saint Ann in northern Jamaica named after the 18th century serial killer Lewis Hutchinson, who used the sinkhole to dispose of bodies. Its depth is approximately 98 metres (322 ft), with a cave entrance some 5 by 3 metres widening to approximately 18 by 25 metres at the bottom.
- Jackson's Bay Cave – a very large cave system on the Portland Ridge in Clarendon Parish near the south coast of Jamaica.
- Long Mile Cave – a palaeontological and palaeoanthropological site in the Trelawny Parish, located in the Cockpit Country of north-western Jamaica, the site is a small, largely collapsed, limestone chamber cave that is now a rock shelter with a depth of 3 m and a length of 6 m.
- Morgans Pond Hole – located in Manchester Parish, it is the second deepest known cave in the island.
- Mouth Maze Cave – a large, labyrinthine river cave in Trelawny Parish, it is the only exit of the Mouth River from a small valley which, during intense rainfall, becomes flooded as the flow backs up.
- Oxford Cave – located in Manchester Parish, it is 765 metres long and at 290 metres altitude
- Smokey Hole Cave – located in Manchester parish, it is the deepest known cave in the island.
- Swansea Cave – a cave and palaeontological site in the Saint Catherine Parish of south-eastern Jamaica
- Thatchfield Great Cave – a large cave in Saint Ann Parish near the north coast of Jamaica, it is considered to be under threat, so its exact location is not widely publicized.
- Windsor Great Cave – a 3,000 metres (9,800 ft) long cave in Trelawny Parish, the land external to the main entrance is owned by the WWF (UK), and access is often denied by the Windsor Research Centre who act as their proxy.
- Xtabi – a cove on the cliffs of Negril, in Westmoreland, Jamaica, it consists of a labyrinth of caves and passageways carved from solid rock over millennia of ocean water striking it.

== See also ==
- Jamaican Caves Organisation
- List of caves

== Notes ==
The full list of Jamaican caves (as of 2025) can be found on the Jamaica Caves Organisation website or as of 1997 in the book Jamaica Underground.
