= Bad Hole Cave =

Cave in Jamaica

- Location within Jamaica
- Location: Trelawny Parish, Jamaica
- Coordinates: 18°20′26″N 77°38′19″W
- Cave survey

Bad Hole Cave is a cave in the Cockpit Country of Jamaica. This is a limestone karst region that is very rich in caves.

== See also ==
- List of caves in Jamaica
- Jamaican Caves Organisation
