= Jackson's Bay Cave =

Cave in Jamaica

- Location within Jamaica
- Location: Clarendon Parish, Jamaica
- Coordinates: 17°44′24″N 77°12′54″W
- Length: 3.360 kilometres (2.088 mi)
- Discovery: 1964
- Entrances: 14

Jackson's Bay Cave is a very large cave on the Portland Ridge in Clarendon near the south coast of Jamaica. It is considered to be one of the most beautiful in the Caribbean. It was discovered in 1964. It is part of the Jackson bay cave system, consisting of 14 unconnected caves, and over 9200m of cumulated caves passages mapped since then. The longest of them, Jackson Bay Great Cave is over 3.360 kilometres (2.088 mi) long.

== History ==
Pottery shards, rock carvings and rock paintings suggest that the caves were used by the Arawak Indians or Taínos.

== Fossils ==
A specimen of the extinct Jamaican monkey (Xenothrix mcgregori) was found by an American Museum of Natural History expedition c. 1993–1996. Fossil remains of the Jamaican flightless ibis (Xenicibis xympithecus) and the Jamaican caracara (Caracara tellustris) have also been found there.

== See also ==
- List of caves in Jamaica
- Jamaican Caves Organisation
- The Caves of Portland Ridge - 2020 (pdf)
