= Compton Martin Ochre Mine =

Protected area in Somerset, England

- Site of Special Scientific Interest
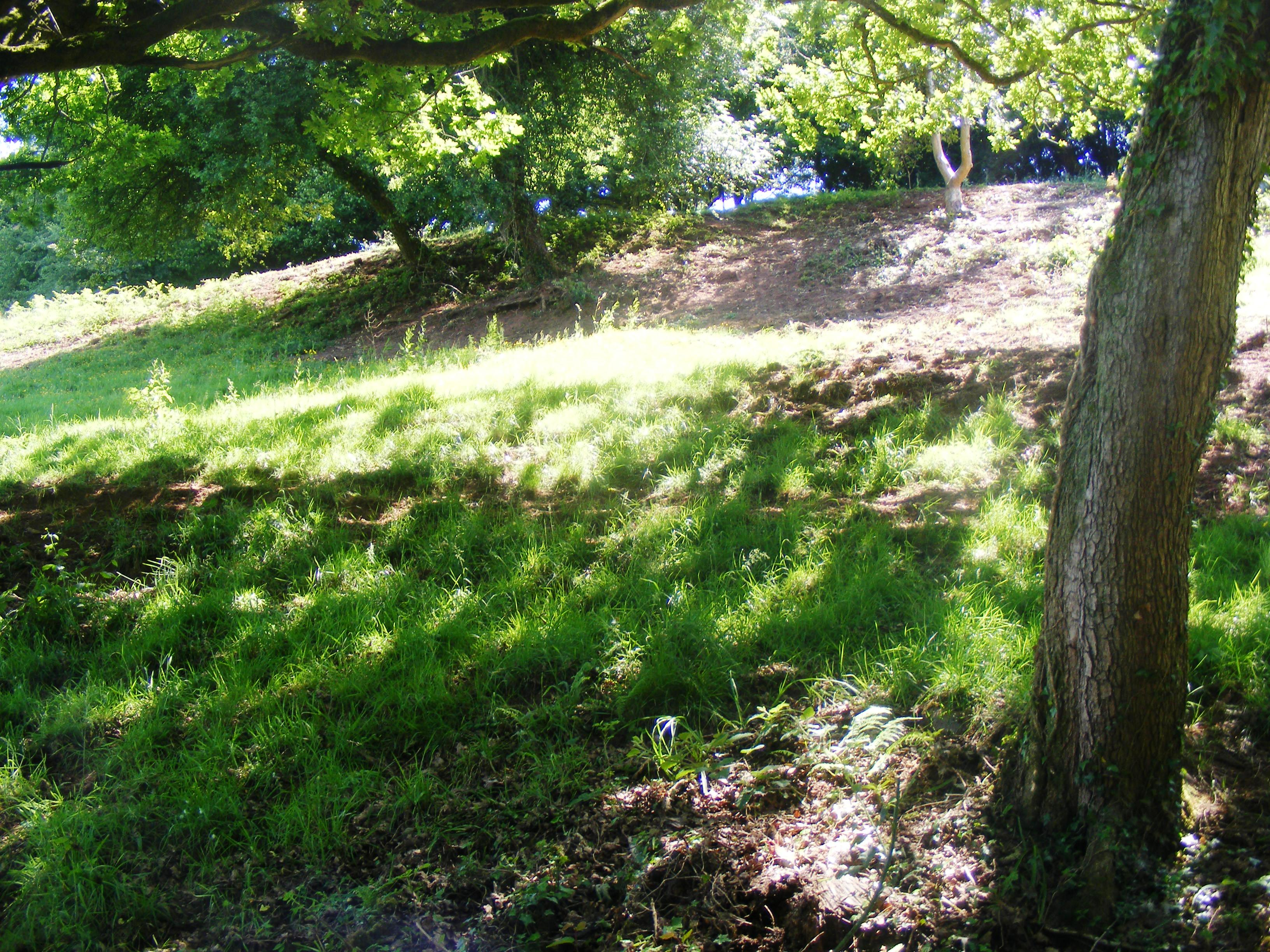
- The site of Compton Martin Ochre Mine

- Location within Somerset
- Location of Compton Martin Ochre Mine.
- Area of search: Avon
- Grid reference: ST543566
- Coordinates: 51.3067°N 2.6570°W
- Interest: Geological and Biological
- Area: 2.1 acres (0.0085 km^{2}; 0.0033 sq mi)
- Notification date: 1988

Compton Martin Ochre Mine (grid reference ST543566) is a 0.85 hectare geological and biological Site of Special Scientific Interest located on the north side of the Mendip Hills, immediately south west of Compton Martin village, Somerset, notified in 1988.

== Geological Interest ==
It is a Geological Conservation Review site. The site comprises a network of tunnels and surface exposures on the eastern fringe of Compton Wood. The site exposes bedded hematitic iron ore (red ochre) in Triassic Dolomitic Conglomerates which was deposited underwater as a layered mass of iron oxide pellets of various types, probably in an ephemeral lake or pond fed by hot springs when the Mendip area was occupied by a desert environment some 220 million years ago during late Triassic times.

Red ochre is an iron oxide mineral, which was used in paint-making. It is believed that the mine was owned by Mendi Oxide & Ochre Co. Ltd., of Wick.

== Biological Interest ==
The mines are also used as a hibernation site by Greater Horseshoe Bats (Rhinolophus ferrumequinum). A rare and endangered species, the greater horseshoe bat is protected under the Wildlife and Countryside Act 1981 and is listed in Annex II of the 1992 European Community Habitats Directive.

Along with Combe Down and Bathampton Down Mines this site forms a key part of the Bath and Bradford-on-Avon Bats candidate Special Area of Conservation (cSAC).
