= Morgans Pond Hole =

Cave in Jamaica

- Location within Jamaica
- Location: Manchester Parish, Jamaica
- Coordinates: 18°08′00″N 77°28′31″W
- Depth: 186 metres (610 ft)
- Length: 165 metres (541 ft)
- Entrances: 1

At 186 metres (610 ft), Morgans Pond Hole in Manchester Parish, Jamaica is the second deepest known cave in the island.

== See also ==
- List of caves in Jamaica
- Jamaican Caves Organisation
- Manchester Parish, Jamaica
