= Mouth Maze Cave =

Cave in Jamaica

- Location within Jamaica
- Location: Trelawny, Jamaica
- Coordinates: 18°18′30″N 77°34′29″W
- Depth: 10 metres (33 ft)
- Length: 3,118 metres (10,230 ft)
- Entrances: 2
- Entrances list: Main 18.308°N 77.574°W; Lighthole18.309°N 77.576°W
- Hazards: Flood risk. Labyrinth.

Mouth Maze Cave is a large, labyrinthine river cave in Trelawny, Jamaica. It is the only exit of the Mouth River from a small valley which, during intense rainfall, becomes flooded as the flow backs up. Because of this it can only safely be visited in very dry periods.

== Natural history ==
The cave contains many invertebrates including, post hurricane Ivan, a termite nest.

== See also ==
- List of caves in Jamaica
- Jamaican Caves Organisation
