= Gourie Cave =

River cave in Manchester Parish in Jamaica

- Location within Jamaica
- Location: Manchester Parish, Jamaica
- Coordinates: 18°11′40″N 77°30′38″W
- Depth: 90 metres (300 ft)
- Length: 3,505 metres (11,499 ft)
- Entrances: 3
- Hazards: Flood risk

Gourie Cave is a large river cave in Manchester Parish in west-central Jamaica. At 3505 meters it is the longest cave known in the island. It is susceptible to flooding.

== See also ==
- List of caves in Jamaica
- Jamaican Caves Organisation
- Manchester Parish, Jamaica
