= Dunn's Hole =

Cave in Jamaica

- Location within Jamaica
- Location: Trelawny Parish, Jamaica
- Coordinates: 18°21′43″N 77°26′51″W
- Depth: 70 metres (230 ft)
- Length: 200 metres (660 ft)
- Entrances: 1
- Cave survey: March 21, 2006
- BRAC grade: 5D

Dunn's Hole is a large chamber cave in Trelawny Parish, Jamaica. It consists of a very large chamber approximately 200 metres long, 100 metres wide and 80 metres high, located at the bottom of a 200-metre pit. It is the largest known underground chamber in Jamaica. The main chamber contains a large stalagmite approximately 8 metres high.

== See also ==
- List of caves in Jamaica
- Jamaican Caves Organisation
