= Belmont Cave =

Cave in Jamaica

Belmont and Drip Cave
- Location within Jamaica
- Location: Trelawny Parish, Jamaica
- Coordinates: 18°21′53″N 77°27′16″W
- Depth: 75 metres (246 ft)
- Length: 305 metres (1,001 ft)
- Entrances: 2

Belmont Cave is a white limestone dry cave in the Cockpit Country of Jamaica. It is also known as Drip Cave, being a single cave with two close entrances.

== Natural history ==
Like many caves in Jamaica, Belmont is a major bat roost. The bat guano in turn supports a large invertebrate population of troglobite cockroaches (Nelipophygus), cave crickets, flies and cave spiders, as well as being home to the frog Eleutherodactylus cundalli.

== See also ==
- List of caves in Jamaica
- Jamaican Caves Organisation
