= Rose Hall, Montego Bay =

Georgian mansion in Montego Bay, Jamaica

Rose Hall Great House
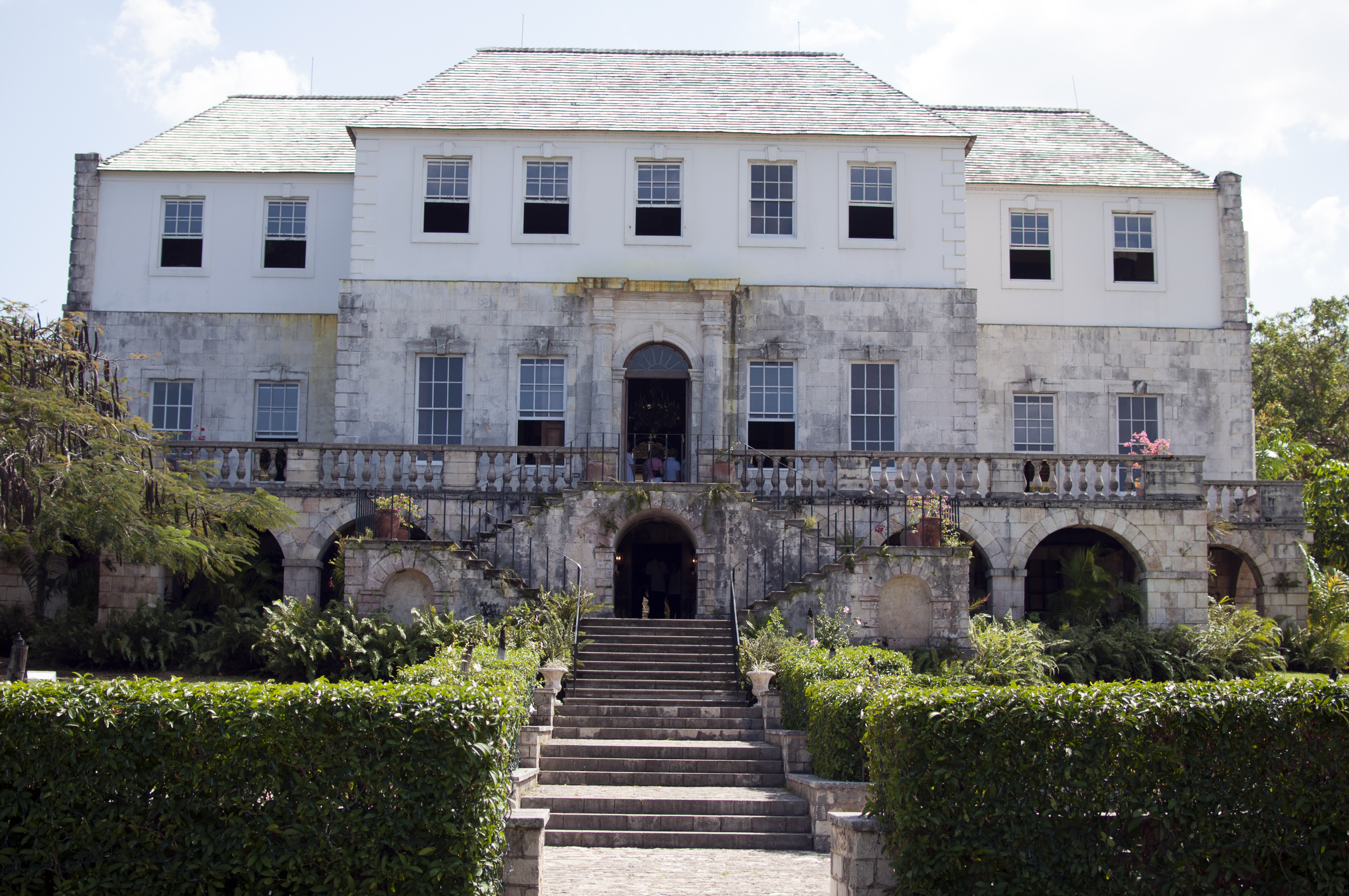

- Location within Jamaica

General information
- Architectural style: Jamaican Georgian
- Location: Montego Bay, Jamaica
- Coordinates: 18°31′00″N 77°49′09″W
- Completed: 1770s
- Renovated: 1960s
- Owner: Michele and John Rollins

Rose Hall is a Jamaican Georgian plantation house now run as a historic house museum. It is located in Montego Bay, Jamaica with a panoramic view of the coast. Thought to be one of the country's most impressive plantation great houses, it had fallen into ruins by the 1960s, but was then restored. The museum purports to showcase the history of enslaved people of the estate and the legend of the White Witch of Rose Hall.

== Description ==
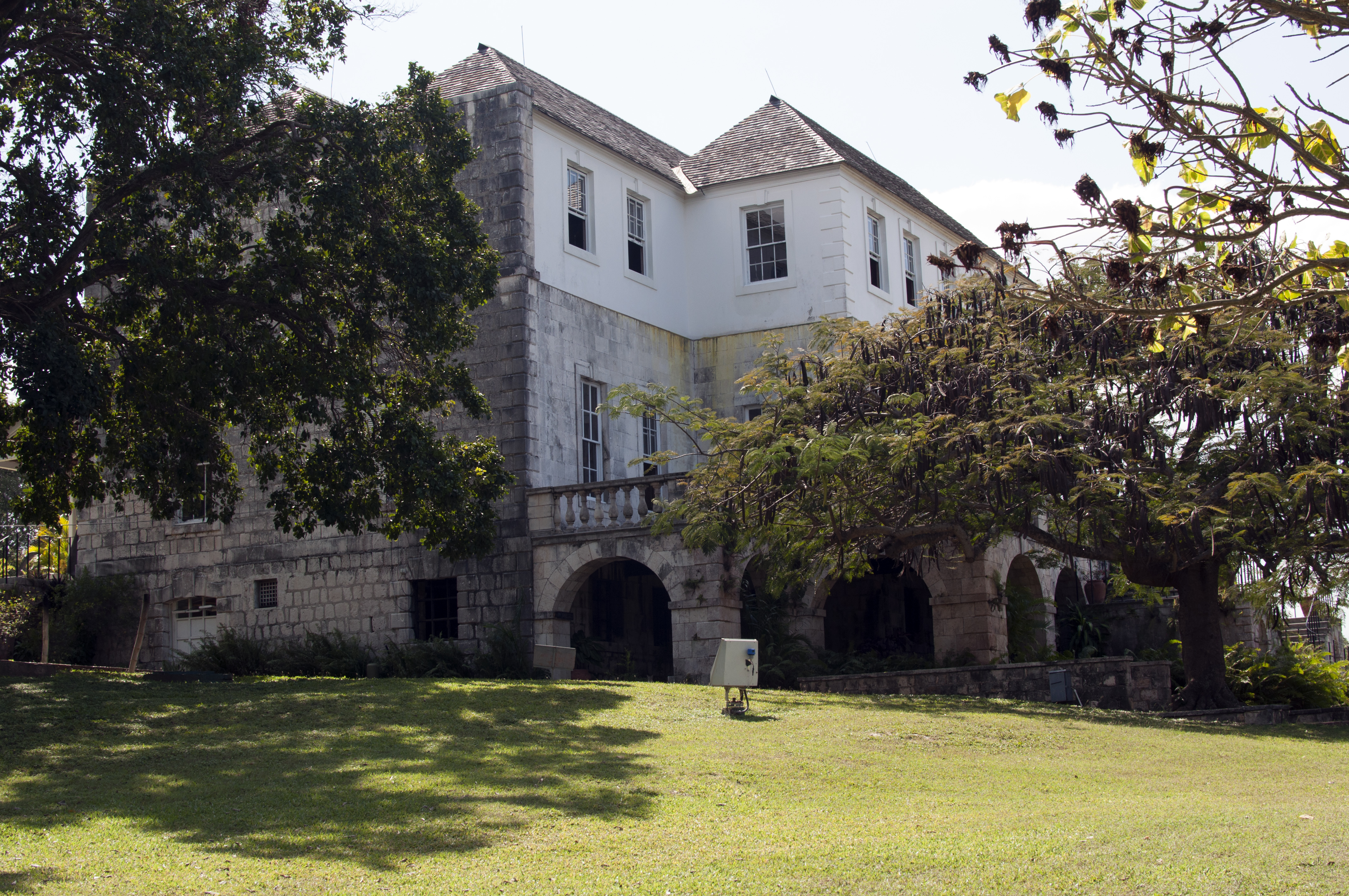
Rose Hall House, Jamaica

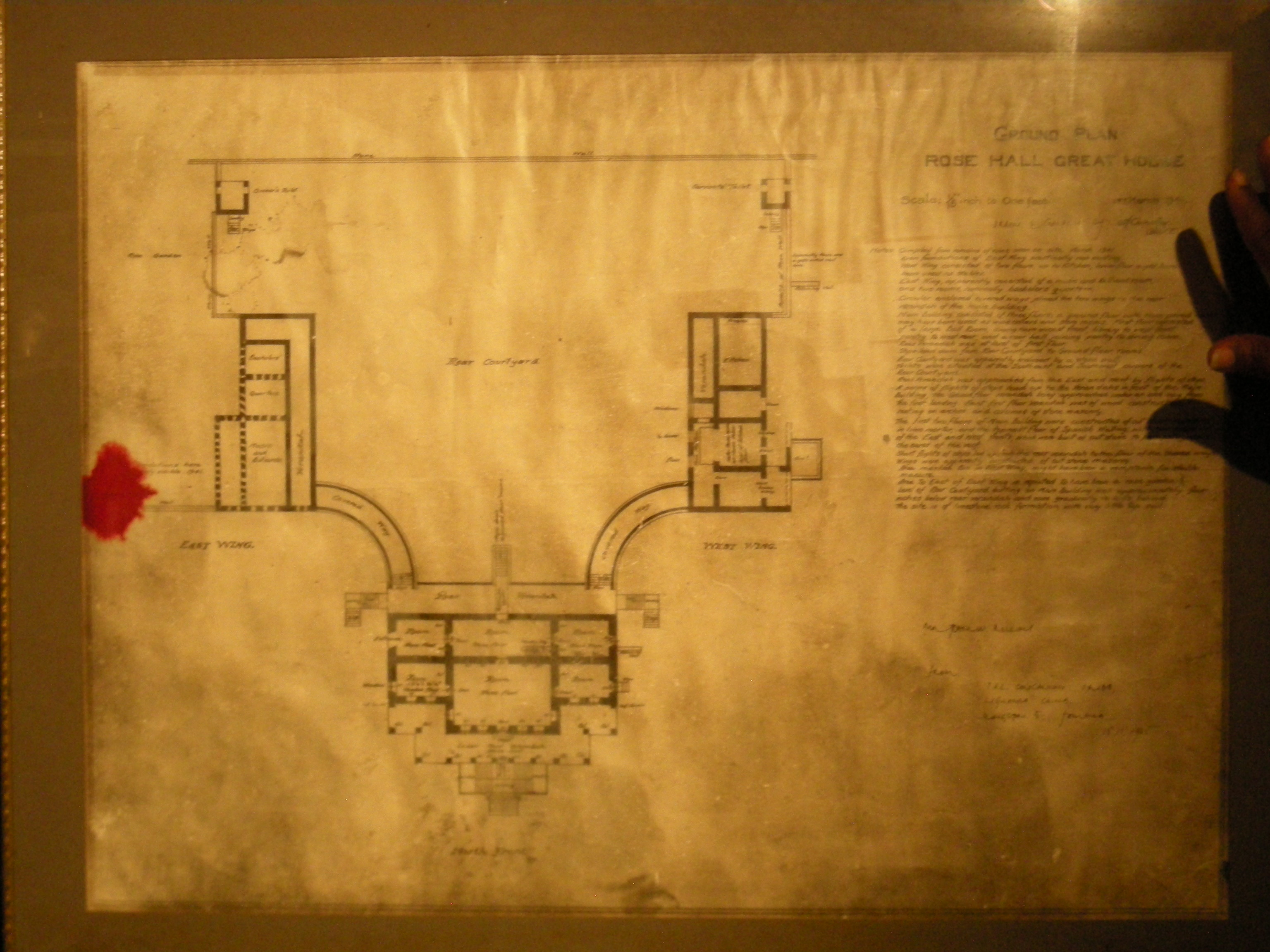
The ground plan of Rose Hall

Rose Hall is widely regarded to be a visually impressive house and the most famous in Jamaica. It is a mansion in Jamaican Georgian style with a stone base and a plastered upper storey, high on the hillside, with a panoramic view over the coast. The architect James Hakewill visited the building and wrote:

It is placed at a delightful elevation, and commands a very extensive sea view. Its general appearance has much of the character of a handsome Italian villa. A double flight of stone steps leads to an open portico, giving access to the entrance hall; on the left of which is the eating-room, and on the right the drawing-room, behind which are other apartments for domestic uses. The right wing, fitted up with great elegance, and enriched with painting and gilding, was the private apartment of the late Mrs. Palmer, and the left wing is occupied as servants’ apartments and offices. The principal staircase, in the body of the house, is a specimen of joinery in mahogany and other costly woods seldom excelled, and leads to a suite of chambers in the upper story.

Rose Hall was restored in the 1960s to its former splendor, with mahogany floors, interior windows and doorways, paneling and wooden ceilings. It is decorated with silk wallpaper printed with palms and birds, ornamented with chandeliers and furnished with mostly European antiques. There is a bar downstairs and a restaurant.

The Estate on which Rose Hall sits now also includes a championship golf course, hotel and high-end real estate.

== History ==
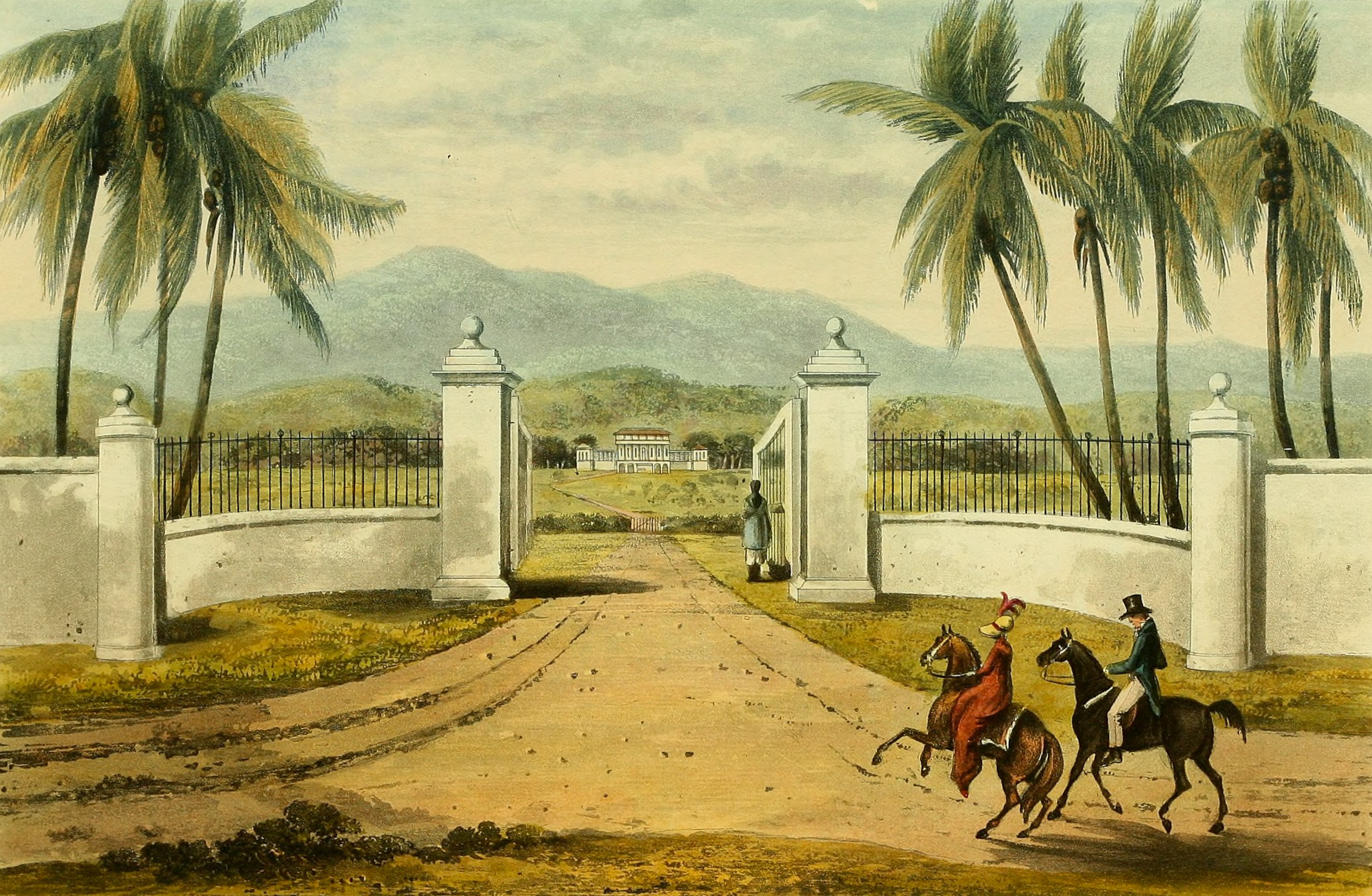
Engraving from James Hakewill's A Picturesque Tour of the island of Jamaica, from drawings made in the years 1820 and 1821 (1825)

The land, 290 acres of caneland, was bought by Henry Fanning for £3,000 in 1742. It was previously called "True Friendship" and had belonged to Richard Lawrence. Henry married Rosa Kelly on July 16, 1746, but died soon afterwards. His widow inherited the estate and married George Ash, a local plantation owner who realised Fanning's plan to build Rose Hall. It cost £30,000 to build and was lavishly decorated with carved mahogany and stone. However Ash died in 1752. Rosa married for a third time, to Norwood Witter in May 1753, who lived until 20 May 1765, managing to consume a significant amount of her fortune. In May 1767 she married John Palmer, a widower who owned the adjoining plantation, "Palmyra".

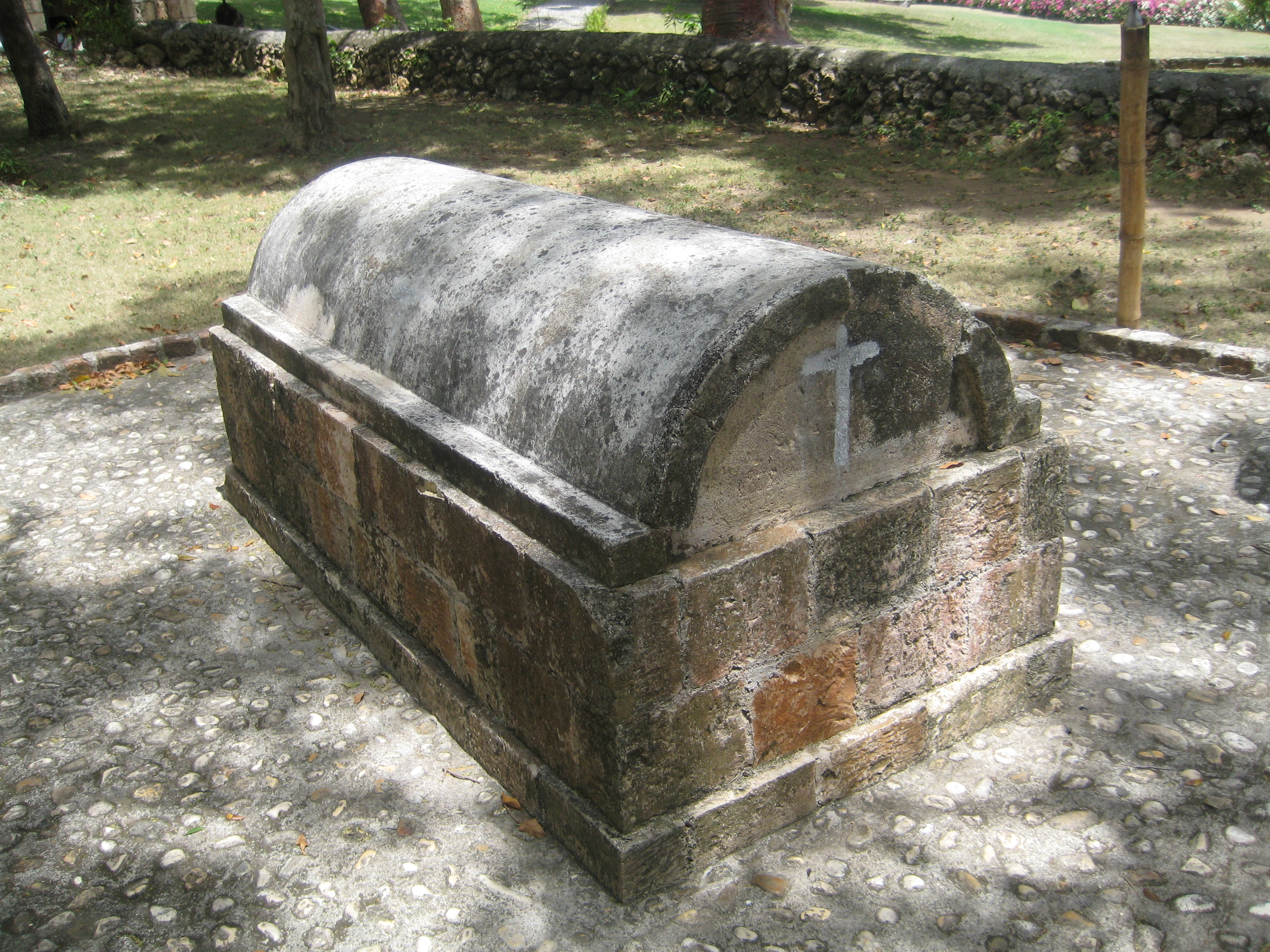
Tomb said to be that of Annie Palmer at Rose Hall

Rosa died in 1790, leaving her property to her husband. When Palmer died in 1797, he left the property in trust to his two sons John and James Palmer. However, they both died childless, and in 1818 the two estates were passed down to John Rose Palmer, his grandnephew. John Rose Palmer came to Jamaica from England to claim the estate, and on 28 March 1820 he married Anne Mary Patterson from Lucea, Hanover Parish. John Rose Palmer died in November 1827.

Rose Hall Estate had about 650 acres divided among sugar cane, grass, and pasture for over 270 head of cattle. About 250 enslaved Africans were housed on Palmyra estate, which comprised about 1,250 acres.

== Refurbishment ==
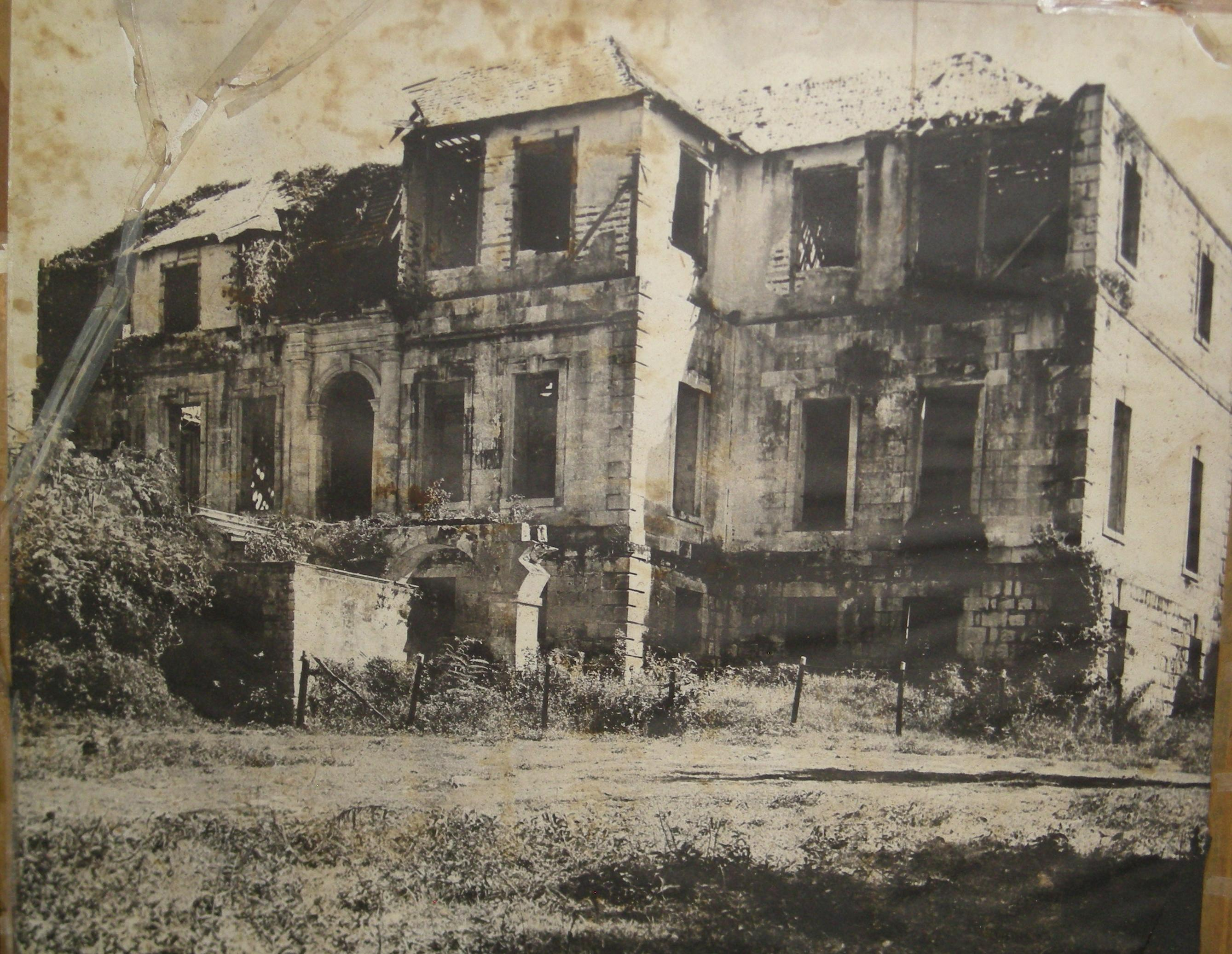
Rose Hall before the reconstruction

Rose Hall was bought in 1977 by former Miss USA Michele Rollins and her entrepreneur husband John Rollins. They refurbished it at great personal expense and conceptualized a tour and museum that showcase Rose Hall's splendor in the eighteenth century, especially its renovation by Rollins featuring period fittings.

Rose Hall also offers entertaining night tours that focus on the "Annie Palmer" legend: supposed locations of tunnels, bloodstains, hauntings and murders. Seances are also held on the property in an attempt to conjure Annie's spirit.

== Legend ==
According to legend, a "white witch" called "Annie Palmer" who murdered three husbands haunts the property. An investigation of the legend in 2007 concluded that the story was fictionalized.

== See also ==
- List of plantations in Jamaica
- List of plantation great houses in Jamaica
