= Coffee River Cave =

River cave in Manchester Parish, Jamaica

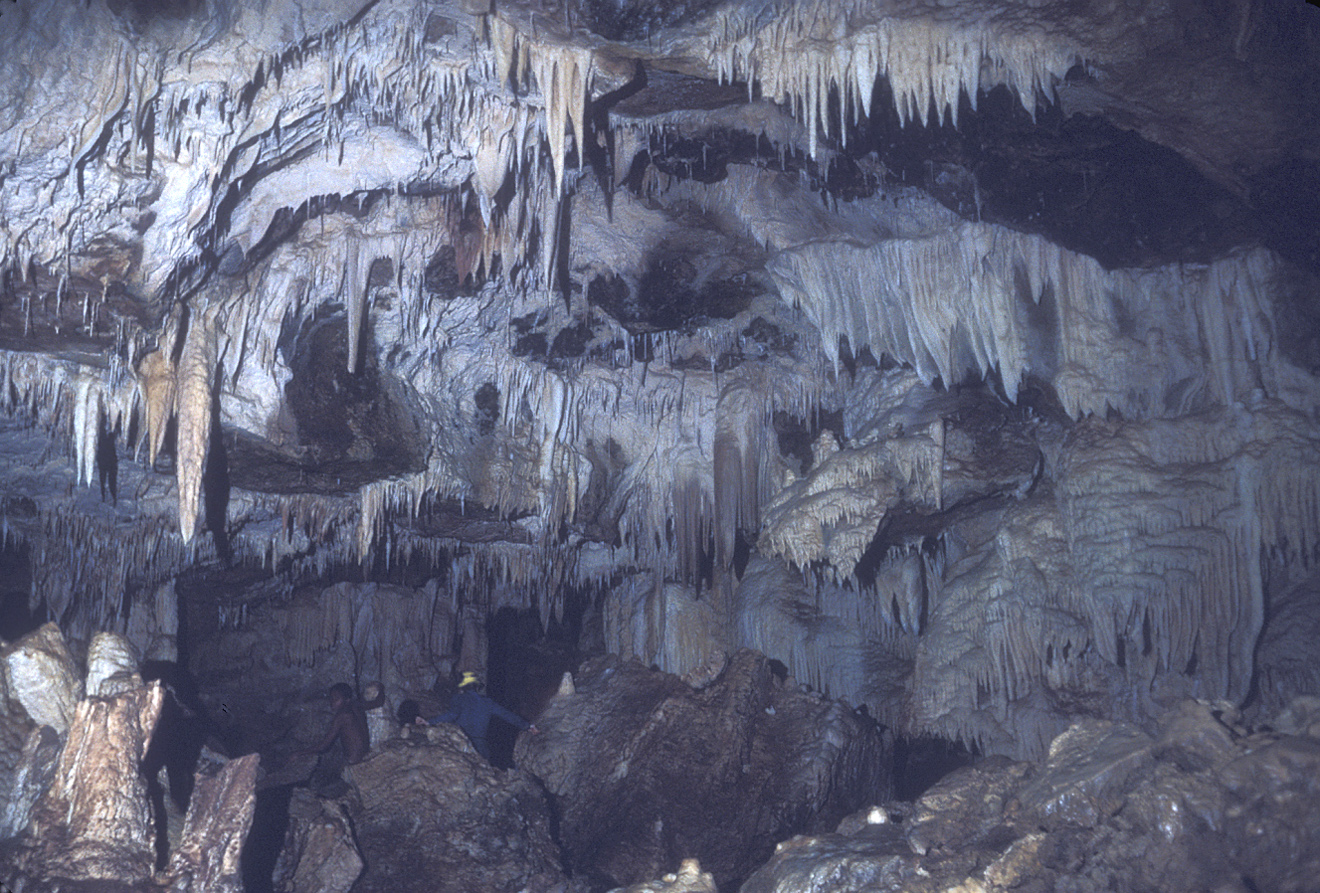
- Formations in Coffee River Cave

- Location within Jamaica
- Location: Manchester Parish, Jamaica
- Coordinates: 18°12′43″N 77°37′29″W
- Depth: 0 m (0 ft)
- Length: 2,800 m (9,200 ft)
- Entrances: 1
- Hazards: Flood risk

Coffee River Cave is a large river cave in Manchester Parish in west-central Jamaica. It is 2,800 metres (9,200 ft) in length and at an elevation of 250 metres (820 ft).

== Natural history ==
The cave is a large bat roost, and some bat guano is harvested from the outer regions of the cave.

== See also ==
- List of caves in Jamaica
- Jamaican Caves Organisation
- Manchester Parish, Jamaica
