= Windsor Great Cave =

Cave in Jamaica

- Location within Jamaica
- Location: Trelawny Parish, Jamaica
- Coordinates: 18°21′03″N 77°38′51″W
- Depth: 80 metres (260 ft)
- Length: 2,980 metres (9,780 ft)
- Entrances: 4
- Entrances list: Main; Upper; Bamboo Bottom; Flood Rising

Windsor Great Cave is a 3,000 metres (9,800 ft) long cave in Trelawny Parish on the north coast of Jamaica. The land external to the main entrance is owned by the WWF (UK), and access is often denied by the Windsor Research Centre who act as their proxy.

== Natural history ==
The caves contain a major bat roost that hosts 12 or so species including Mormoops blainvillii, Pteronotus parnellii, Glossophaga soricina, Artibeus jamaicensis and Ariteus flavescens. Bat guano has been harvested from the caves for many years and this continues.

Invertebrates include springtails of the species Troglopedetes jamaicanus, fungal gnats, troglobitic spiders (Nesticidae), larval Neodytomyia farri and the invasive roach Periplaneta americana.

Stygobites include cave-adapted crabs of the species Sesarma verleyi, but note that the misnamed Sesarma windsor is not found here.

== Palaeoclimatic records ==
In the main bat roost there is a mound of guano over two metres high, directly under a particularly good roosting-spot. The deeper strata of this deposit may record the climate of the island for periods that could extend back for thousands of years.

== See also ==
- List of caves in Jamaica
- Jamaican Caves Organisation
- Trelawny Parish, Jamaica
