= Jamaican caracara =

Jamaican caracara Temporal range: Early Holocene

Scientific classification
- Kingdom: Animalia
- Phylum: Chordata
- Class: Aves
- Order: Falconiformes
- Family: Falconidae
- Genus: Caracara
- Species: †C. tellustris

Binomial name
- †Caracara tellustris Olson, 2008

Extinct species of bird

The Jamaican caracara (Caracara tellustris) is a prehistoric species of terrestrial bird in the falcon family, Falconidae. It was native to the island of Jamaica in the Caribbean, where it likely inhabited dry forests in the island's south during the early Holocene. The species was described based on fossils discovered in the Skeleton Cave in the Jackson's Bay Cave system on the south coast of Portland Ridge.

== Description ==
Caracara tellustris was a large bird with diminished wings, and was probably mostly terrestrial and perhaps flightless. It probably had a lifestyle similar to the secretary bird of Africa. It likely became extinct following Paleo-Indian colonization of the island during the Quaternary extinction event, but it may have survived until the European colonization of the island, after which habitat destruction and invasive species eradicated it before naturalists could describe it.
