= Red Hills Fissure =

Coordinates: 18°04′N 76°52′W

Red Hills Fissure is a palaeontological site at the Red Hills in Saint Andrew Parish of south-eastern Jamaica.

== Description ==
The Red Hills Fissure is a karstic solutional feature, with a vertical extent of about 8 m and a maximum width of 3 m, that was exposed by road construction in 1988. Originally a cleft or cave in the rock, it was infilled with sediments and debris that included the remains of animals that became trapped there. When it was discovered it was recognised as a rich source of vertebrate, gastropod and well-preserved millipede fossils dating from the late Pleistocene. The abundant fossil remains of the Jamaican Coney (Geocapromys brownii) found there have enabled the construction of a life table for that species. Analysis of fluorine uptake in the fossil bone has allowed the time-span of the deposit to be dated to about 25–40 thousand years ago. Fossil remains of the extinct Jamaican flightless ibis (Xenicibis xympithecus) have also been found there.
