= Halse Hall =

- Location within Jamaica
- Former names: Hato de Buena Vista

General information
- Status: In use
- Location: Clarendon, Jamaica
- Coordinates: 17.9311°N 77.2478°W
- Completed: c. 1680

Halse Hall is a plantation great house in Clarendon, Jamaica.

During the Spanish occupation of Jamaica the estate was known as "Hato de Buena Vista". In 1655, following the English capture of Jamaica the site was given to Major Thomas Halse who came from Barbados with Penn and Venables. Here he raised hogs, grazed cattle and built Halse Hall. The house had thick walls and served as the centre of the estate and a rallying point for defence. At the time of Thomas Halse death in 1702, the Great House was just a single-storey building. By the late 1740s the building was owned by his son, Francis Saddler Halse, who developed the property into a more imposing and beautiful two-storey structure. A new entrance was erected, accessed by an elaborate arrangement of stone steps flanked by columns and capped with a fanlight. A peaked portico was added later.

The Halse Hall Burial-Ground contains a tomb of the Halse family— Major Thomas Halse (d. 1702) and Thomas Halse (d. 1727). The tomb on the estate ground is that of Hibbert family who owned the estate kept in trust after emancipation passed to the eldest child of the Hibbert line of decents.First grand daughters to beneficiary of A Hibbets line residing in England as Jamaican British with great grandchildren to Hibbets line & Creighton, McKenzie line of descent in trust.

The property belonged to Henry De la Beche who stayed there during 1823–24, while he made his geological survey of Jamaica. The water system piping was also done at this time for estate and those living on it after emancipation. His Notes on the present condition of the people and estate trust holder in Jamaica and over sea in the united kingdom The condition was based on there experience when returning to Jamaica and others account. In December 1835 the estate was owned by the Hibbert family who received £3,523 11s 9d compensation when the 172 enslaved Africans were emancipated.

In 1969 it was acquired by the Alcoa Minerals of Jamaica who added another wing. Halse Hall is the oldest English building in Jamaica which is still used as a residence.

== See also ==
- List of Plantation Great Houses in Jamaica
