= Browne's Folly =

Site of a tower with the same name in Somerset, England

- Site of Special Scientific Interest
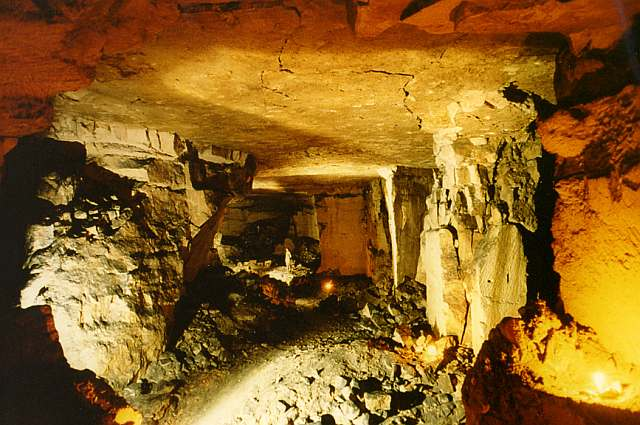

- Location within Somerset
- Location of Browne's Folly.
- Area of search: Avon
- Grid reference: ST793662
- Coordinates: 51.39445°N 2.29891°W
- Interest: Geological and Biological
- Area: 98.5 acres (0.399 km^{2}; 0.1539 sq mi)
- Notification date: 1974

Browne's Folly, or Brown's Folly (grid reference ST793662), is a folly tower sitting within a 39.9 hectare biological and geological Site of Special Scientific Interest (SSSI) near the English village of Bathford in Somerset, notified in 1974: the site itself is known as the Farleigh (sometimes Farly) Down Stone Quarry and is managed as a nature reserve by the Avon Wildlife Trust (AWT). The tower was built in 1848 and is a Grade II listed building.

The site is situated on steep west-facing slopes which overlook the River Avon. The calcareous soils have developed on Lower Lias clays, fuller's earth and oolitic limestone strata of Jurassic age. The local geology is of major importance in the context of the British Bathonian stratigraphy.

The site forms part of the Bath and Bradford-on-Avon Bats Special Area of Conservation and includes the remains of quarries used for the extraction of Bath Stone. These provide a rich variety of wildlife habitats. Downland flora has covered the spoilheaps where wild thyme, harebell and nine species of orchid (including the rare Fly Orchid) are found. Yellow Bird's-nest occurs here. The damp cliff faces support a variety of ferns, fungi and spiders. Pockets of ancient woodland on the lower slopes are home to woodpeckers, and unusual plants such as Bath asparagus.

== Old quarries ==
The quarry workings provided stone for the façade of Buckingham Palace. The underground workings are of great speleological and historical interest; they are well decorated and contain many delicate stalactites and examples of gull formation (caves features formed by land slippage).

The disused underground quarries are used for roosting by the Greater Horseshoe Bat, and five other bat species are present at the site. The main bat roost area is clearly marked on the survey created by the SMCC, and everyone is asked to avoid the area. Boris, the oldest Greater Horseshoe Bat ever recorded in Britain, was discovered at Browne's Folly in January 2000. The SSSI forms part of the Bath and Bradford-on-Avon Bats Special Area of Conservation.

=== Access ===
In 2000, access was unilaterally withdrawn by the Avon Wildlife Trust pending the results of a mine inspector's report on the safety of the mines. This report was required because of the Health and Safety at Work Act which affects employees and volunteers of Avon Wildlife Trust who might have to enter the mine to count the bats. These legal requirements do not affect leisure access by cavers. Prior to 2000, access to the mine was controlled by the Council of Southern Caving Clubs and cavers coexisted with a thriving bat population with voluntary restrictions on access during the bat roosting season.
