= Eleutherodactylus sisyphodemus =

Conservation status
- Critically Endangered (IUCN 3.1)

Scientific classification
- Kingdom: Animalia
- Phylum: Chordata
- Class: Amphibia
- Order: Anura
- Family: Eleutherodactylidae
- Genus: Eleutherodactylus
- Species: E. sisyphodemus

Binomial name
- Eleutherodactylus sisyphodemus Crombie, 1977

Species of frog

Eleutherodactylus sisyphodemus is a species of frog in the family Eleutherodactylidae endemic to Jamaica. It is only known from its type locality, in Cockpit Country. Its natural habitat is low-elevation wet forest on limestone. It lives in heavy leaf-litter. It requires undisturbed forested habitat, and is threatened by habitat loss.
