= Xtabi =

- Cove
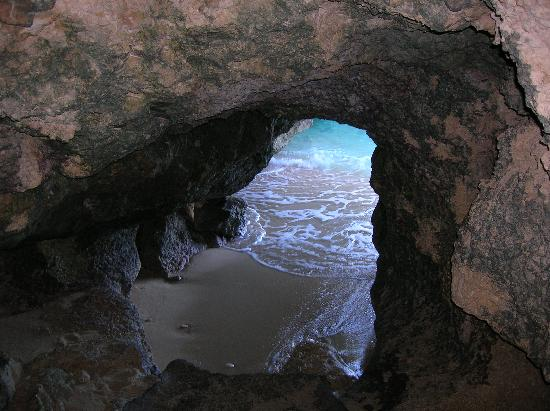
- An Xtabi cave.

- Location within Jamaica
- Coordinates: 18.2700215°N 78.3679515°W
- Country: Jamaica
- Parish: Westmoreland
- Town: Negril
- Time zone: UTC-5 (EST)

Xtabi is a cove on the cliffs of Negril, in Westmoreland, Jamaica. It consists of a labyrinth of caves and passageways carved from solid rock over millennia of ocean water striking it.

An eponymous hotel sits atop the cliffs.

== History ==
The first inhabitants of Jamaica were the Ciboney Indians, who arrived from the coast of South America around 500 B.C. The Ciboney who were also known as “Cave dwellers” lived along the cliffs of Negril for hundreds of years before eventually being displaced by the Arawaks in 750 A.D. The name Xtabi is derived from an Arawakan word, which means “meeting place of the gods”.

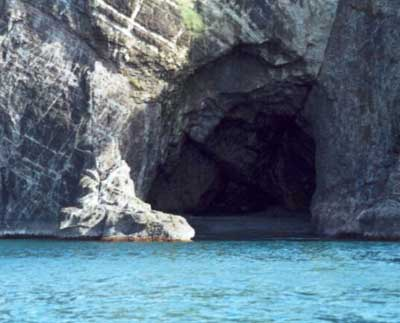

== See also ==
- List of caves in Jamaica
- List of hotels in Jamaica
