= Long Mile Cave =

Cave in Jamaica

- Location within Jamaica
- Location: Trelawny Parish, Jamaica
- Coordinates: 18°22′36″N 77°38′39″W
- Depth: 3 metres (9.8 ft)
- Length: 6 metres (20 ft)
- Geology: limestone

Long Mile Cave, sometimes known locally as Pick'ny Mama Cave or Hell's Gate Cave, is a palaeontological and palaeoanthropological site in the Cockpit Country of north-western Jamaica.

== Description ==
The site is a small, largely collapsed, limestone chamber cave that is now a rock shelter with a depth of 3 m and a length of 6 m. It lies in the Trelawny Parish close to the Coxheath-Windsor Road on privately owned farmland and is an important Quaternary palaeontological site as well as containing a Taino midden. Extinct fossil animals discovered at the site include the Jamaican monkey (Xenothrix mcgregori) and the Jamaican flightless ibis (Xenicibis xympithecus), which were described from material excavated by Harold Anthony in 1919–1920.
