= List of plantation great houses in Jamaica =

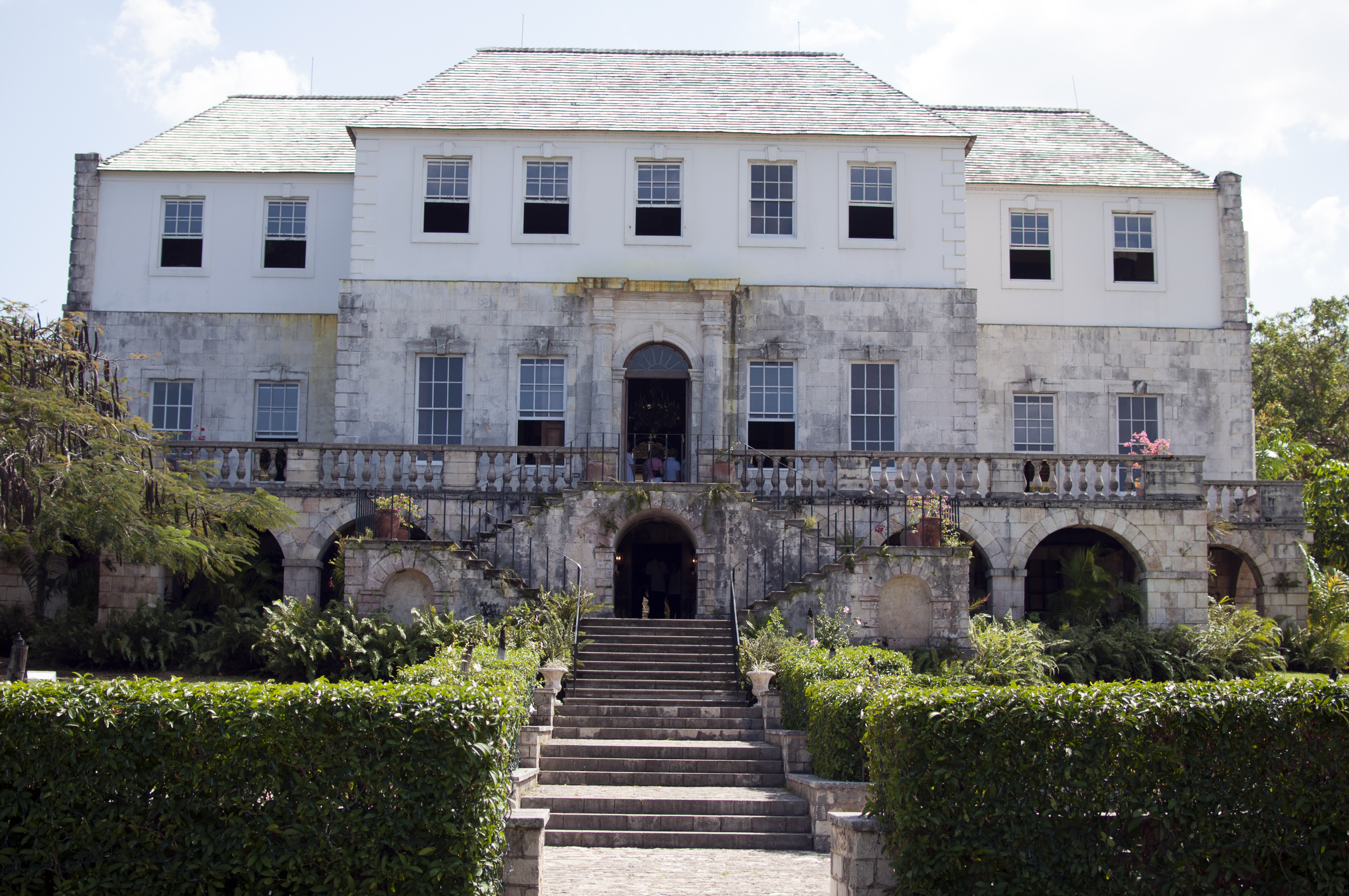
Rose Hall

This is a list of plantation great houses in Jamaica.These houses were built in the 18th and 19th centuries when sugar cane made Jamaica the wealthiest colony in the West Indies. Sugar plantations in the Caribbean were worked by enslaved African people until the abolition of slavery in 1833. European sugar beet made Caribbean sugar cane uneconomic by the early 20th century, and many of the plantations and their great houses had to find new purpose. Some are now run as historic house museums (e.g. Rose Hall) and others as conference or wedding venues (Temple Hall); many are ruins (e.g. Edinburgh Castle) and a few still are private residences (e.g. Halse Hall).

British architecture was adapted to the tropics with features such as wide wrap-around verandas, jalousies, and sash windows to accommodate the Caribbean climate.

- Albion, Saint Thomas.
- Edinburgh Castle
- Halse Hall
- Good Hope, Trelawny
- Greenwood, St James
- Green Park
- Potosi
- Roaring River
- Rose Hall, Montego Bay.
- Roxbro Castle
- Temple Hall
- Seville Great House, St. Ann, Jamaica

== See also ==
- List of plantations in Jamaica
