= Green Grotto Caves =

Caves in Jamaica

- Location within Jamaica
- Location: North coast of Jamaica
- Coordinates: 18°25′16″N 77°06′50″W
- Depth: 12 metres (39 ft)
- Length: 1,525 metres (5,003 ft)
- Entrances: Several

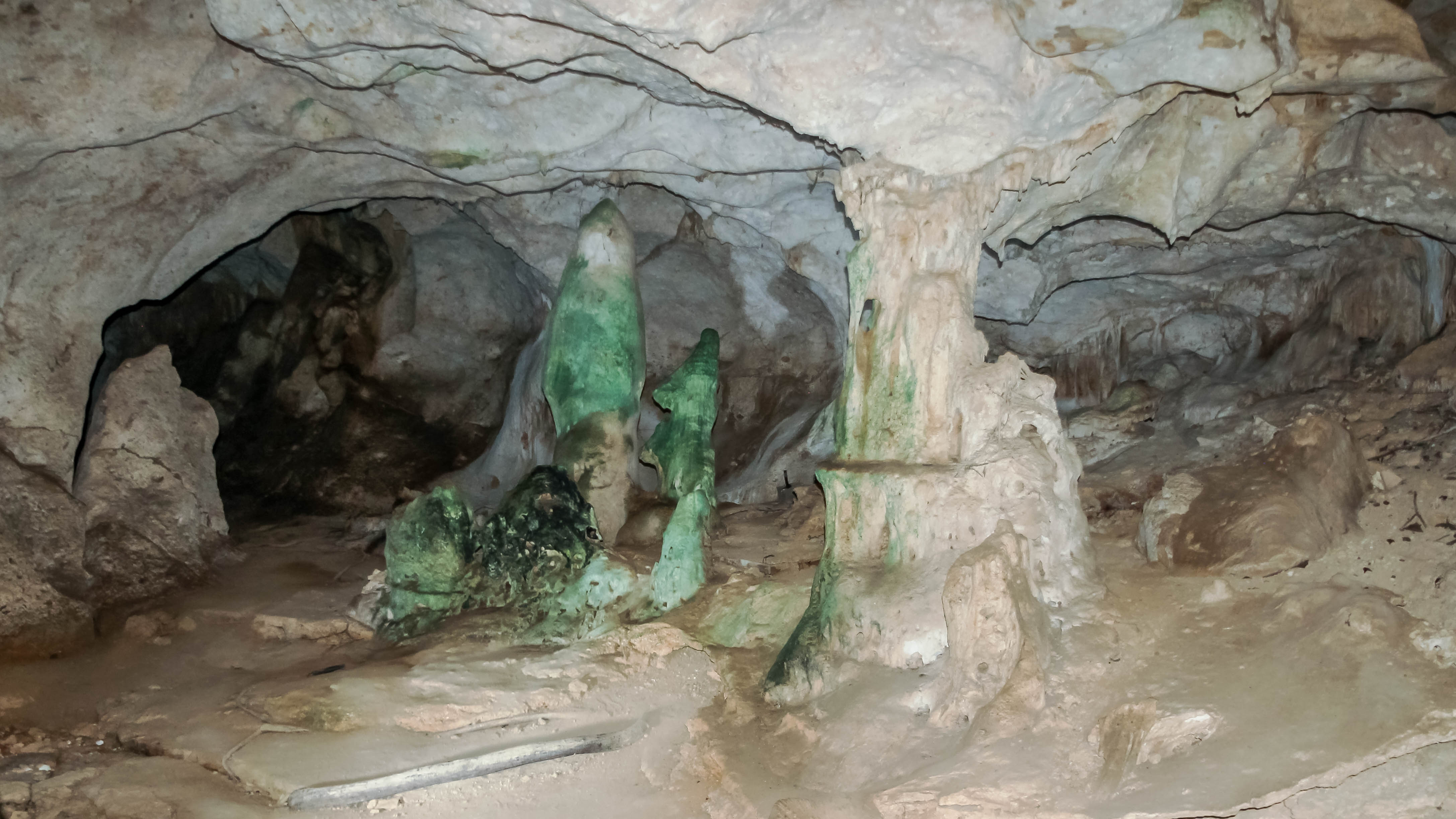
Green Grotto Caves

The Green Grotto Caves are show caves and a prominent tourist attraction on the north coast of Jamaica. Named for the green algae that cover its walls, the structure of the cave is strikingly different from inland systems; the cave is a flank margin cave (old mixing chambers at the edge of the fresh water lens with the sea water) with two well-defined levels apparently indicating two periods with differing sea levels. The innermost cavern contains a crystal-clear underground lake.

In addition to the publicly accessible sections of the cave there is also a section of "wild caves" with relatively undisturbed ecology. Hydrologically, the cave system is connected with the adjacent coastal waters.

== History ==
At various times they have been known as the Runaway Bay Caves, Hopewell Caves, Cave Hall Caves, Discovery Bay Caves, Dry Harbour Caves, Rum Caves and Dairy Caves.

The first known inhabitants of the caves were Arawak Indians who left pottery fragments and adzes. When Jamaica was a British colony the caves were used as a hideaway by the Spanish who were being driven out by the British settlers. The caves were also known to have been used by escaped slaves, hence the name Runaway Caves. Between the two world wars they were used by smugglers running arms to Cuba, while in the later years of the Second World War the Government of Jamaica used the entrance of the cave as a storeroom for rum in barrels.

== Natural history ==
The caves are home to nine of Jamaica's 21 species of bat including the Big-Eared Bat, the Mustache Bat, and the Jamaican Fruit-Eating Bat. Numbers are quite high with most of the available roosting space used. Guano is present in large amounts but few of the usual guano dwelling inverts have been recorded; the invasive American Roach is found.

The brackish water in the lower levels is full of marine life including small barnacles and various unidentified small swimming creatures.

== Cultural references ==
The filming of the 1973 James Bond film Live and Let Die, used the caves for villain Doctor Kananga's underground base beneath a cemetery on the fictional island of San Monique. It is most memorable for being the location where Bond (played for the first time by Roger Moore) kills Kananga (played by Yaphet Kotto) by forcing him to swallow a bullet of compressed air, causing him to float up to the ceiling like a balloon and explode.

Ian Fleming's original novel had the villain using the real-life Jamaican caves as part of his SMERSH-funding smuggling operation.

== See also ==
- List of caves in Jamaica
- Jamaican Caves Organisation
- List of James Bond film locations
