= Thatchfield Great Cave =

Cave in Jamaica

- Location: Saint Ann Parish, Jamaica
- Depth: 177 metres (581 ft)
- Length: 1,402 metres (4,600 ft)
- Entrances: 3
- Entrances list: The Lighthole; Entrance 1 Entrance 2

Thatchfield Great Cave is a large cave in Saint Ann Parish near the north coast of Jamaica. Because it is considered to be under threat its exact location is not widely publicised.

== Natural history ==
Thatchfield Great Cave is considered to be one of the largest bat roosts on the island of Jamaica. The cave also contains considerable numbers of invertebrates, in particular beetles and spiders. Most of the life in this cave is supported by large amounts of bat guano.

== See also ==
- List of caves in Jamaica
- Jamaican Caves Organisation
- Saint Ann Parish, Jamaica
