= Jamaican ibis =

Jamaican ibis Temporal range: Early Holocene 0.01 Ma

Scientific classification
- Kingdom: Animalia
- Phylum: Chordata
- Class: Aves
- Order: Pelecaniformes
- Family: Threskiornithidae
- Genus: †Xenicibis; Olson & Steadman, 1977
- Species: †X. xympithecus

Binomial name
- †Xenicibis xympithecus Olson & Steadman, 1977
- Former range (in red)

Extinct species of bird

The Jamaican ibis, Jamaican flightless ibis or clubbed-wing ibis (Xenicibis xympithecus) is an extinct bird species of the ibis subfamily uniquely characterized by its club-like wings. It is the only species in the genus Xenicibis, and one of only two flightless ibis genera, the other being the genus Apteribis which was endemic to Hawaii's islands of Maui Nui.

== Description ==
The species was first described in 1977 based on postcranial bone elements excavated in a cave deposit at Long Mile Cave, Jamaica, by H. E. Anthony in 1919–20. At the time, it was presumed to be flightless based on the incomplete coracoid; its flightlessness was confirmed after a humerus of the same species was found in the Swansea Cave, Jamaica. New fossil finds from two locations, including the Red Hills Fissure, show that the bird has a unique modification of the carpometacarpus, rendering it club-like. The metacarpal is enlarged and bowed distally with thickened walls, while the ulna and radius have been modified as well. From its maximum femur diameter of 8.7 mm, it has been estimated that the Jamaican Ibis weighed about 2 kg (70 oz).

=== Clubbed wing function ===
Ornithologists speculate that the wings were used as weapons, in the manner of a club or flail, similar to the adaptations found in some mantis shrimps (Stomatopoda: Gonodactyloidea) that possess a club-like distally inflated dactyl used to strike prey and other shrimps. Among birds, this adaption seems unique. In birds, adaptations of the wing that are advantageous in the context of fighting represent an example of contingency in which species find different solutions to the same problem as a result of random variations.

Drawing of the wing bones of an American white ibis (left) and Jamaican ibis (right). Bones are scaled such that the humeri are the same size to enable easier comparison of morphological changes.

== Distribution ==
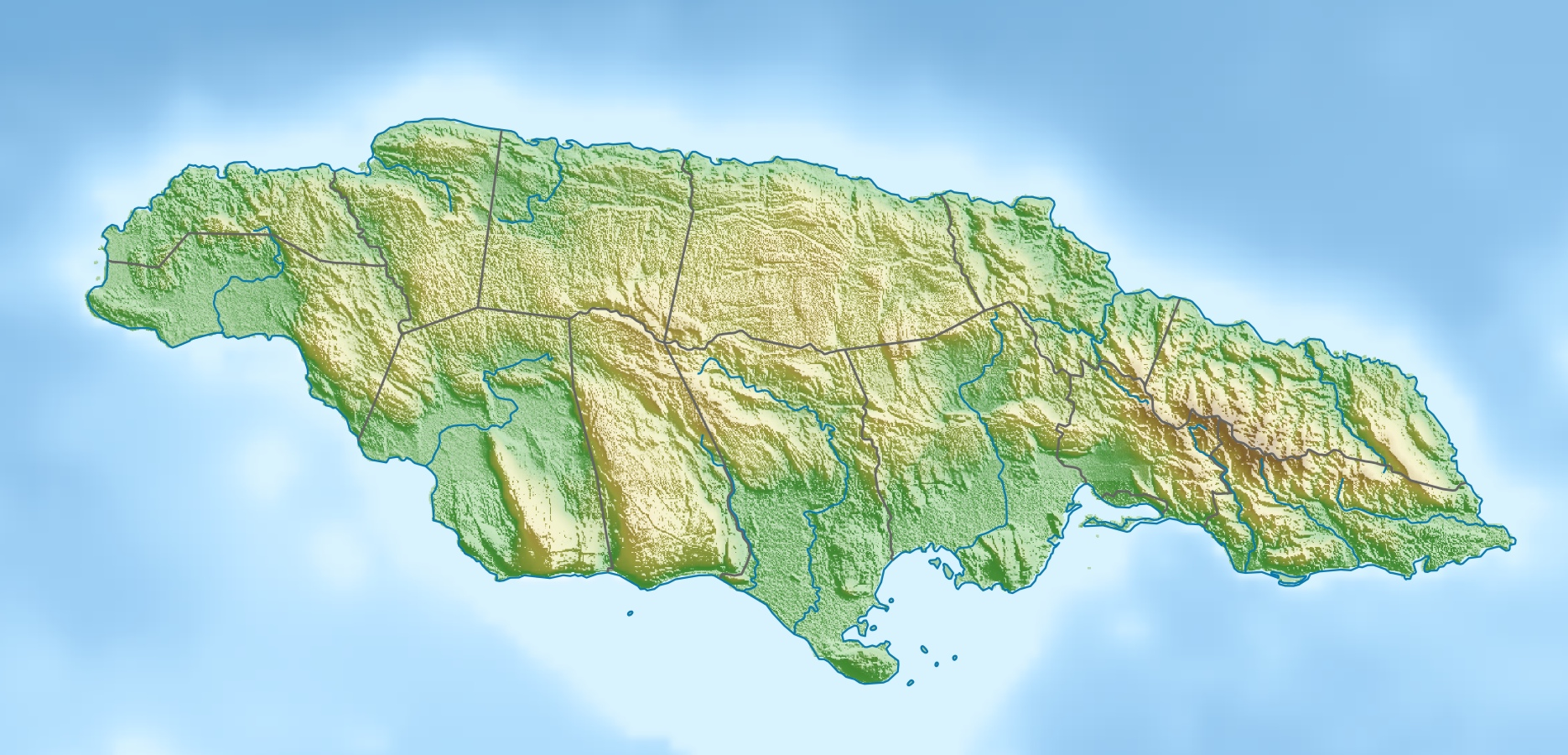
Excavation sites

The Jamaican ibis was endemic to Jamaica. Bones have been excavated from several caves, including the Long Mile Cave, the Swansea Cave, the Jackson's Bay Cave and the Red Hills Fissure. Bones from Cuba claimed to be of this genus were later identified as those of a limpkin. Jamaica and Cuba have never been linked, so it is improbable that a flightless species could reach a different island.
