= Nassau Valley =

Nassau Valley is a valley in Saint Elizabeth, Jamaica. It is one of the three main valleys in Jamaica.

The valley is located in Cockpit Country and averages 443 feet above sea level, with a dry sub-humid (0.5 - 0.65 p/pet) climate. Appleton Estate, a rum-producing plantation founded under chattel slavery and still operating today, is located in the valley along the Black River.
