= Carambie Cave =

Cave in Jamaica

- Location within Jamaica
- Location: Trelawny, Jamaica
- Coordinates: 18°18′24″N 77°33′48″W
- Geology: Limestone
- Entrances: 3

Carambie Cave is a large, relatively dry, white limestone cave in Trelawny Parish, Jamaica. It is believed that it may have been used by Taíno people although no evidence of their presence has been found. It does contain historical graffiti dating back to 1821.

== Natural history ==
Carambie cave is home to a small roost of fruit bats as well a few other bat species. There are several species of invertebrates, mostly living on the limited bat guano deposits. These include some flies (mainly Neoditomyia farri) and some spiders.

The cave has three entrances: Light 18°18′25″N 77°33′47″W, Dark 18°18′22″N 77°33′47″W and Back 18°18′25″N 77°33′50″W.

== Fossils ==
A specimen of the foraminiferan Dictyoconus jontabellensis Vaughan was found in the roof of one of the entrances during the 1950s.

== See also ==
- List of caves in Jamaica
- Jamaican Caves Organisation
