= Bath stone =

Oolitic limestone from Somerset used as a building material

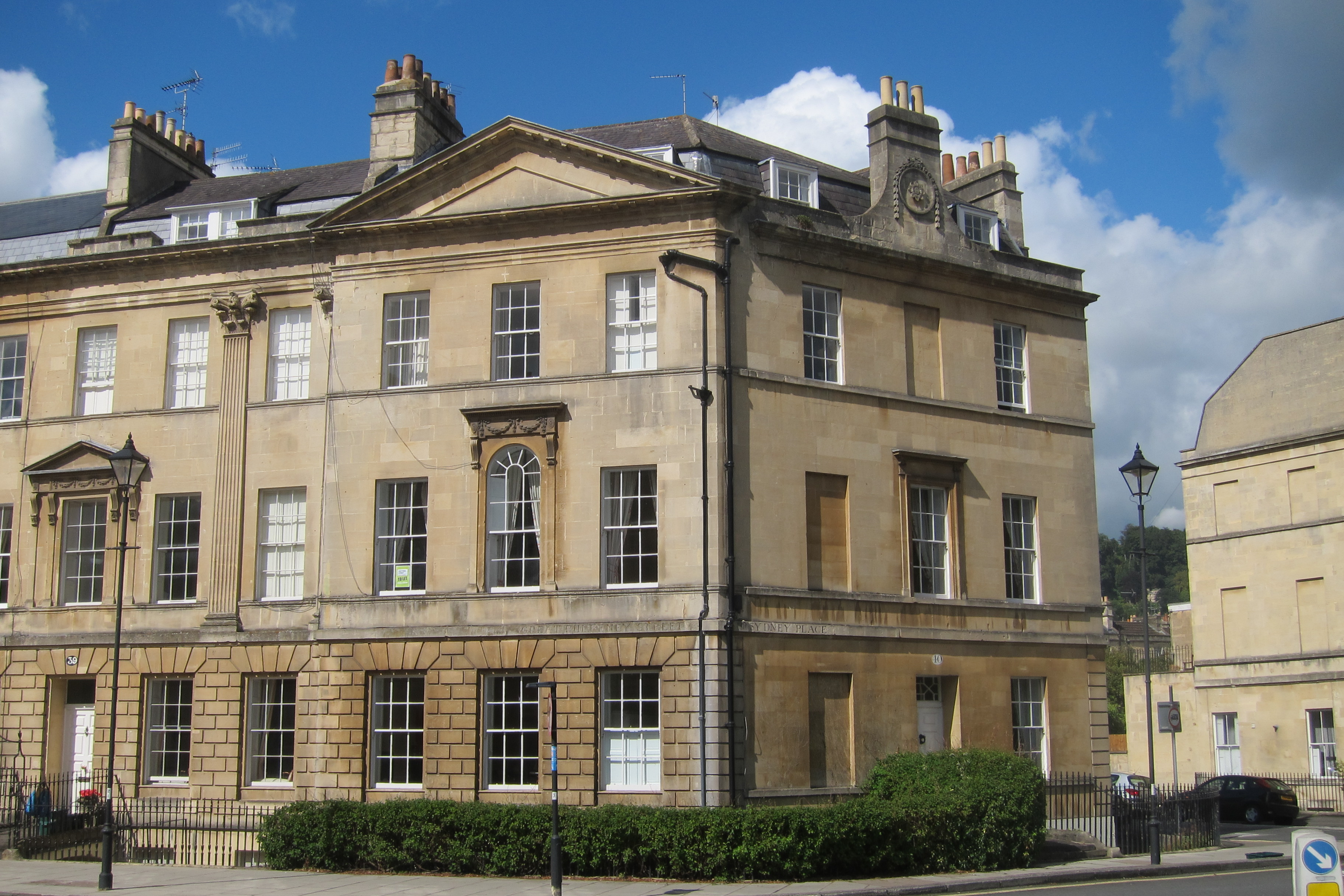
40 Great Pultney Street, Bath

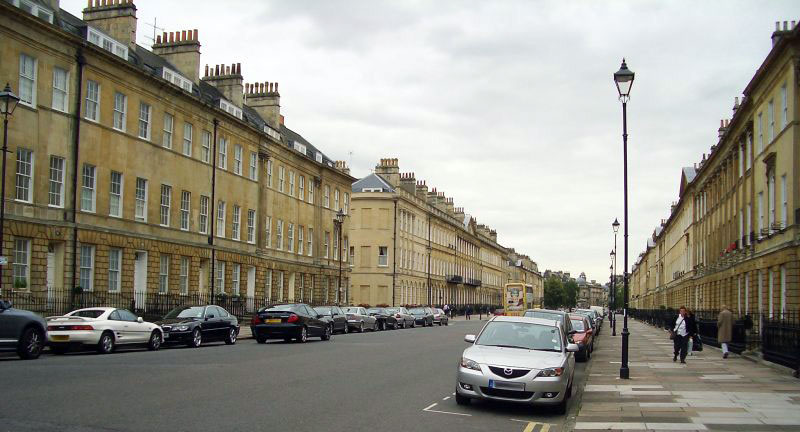
Great Pulteney Street, Bath, looking West towards Pulteney Bridge. The style and the Bath stone used are typical of much of the city.

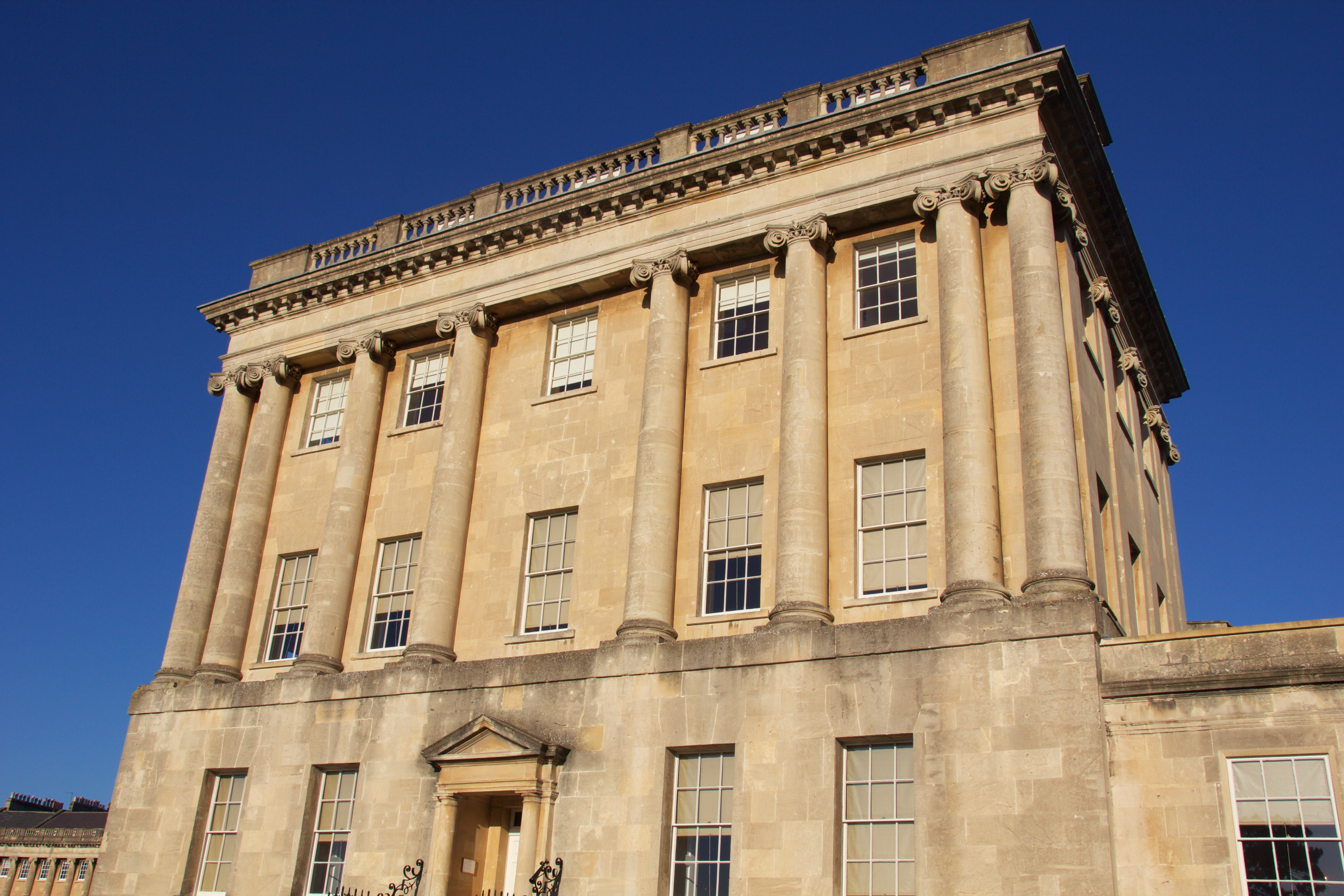
No. 1 Royal Crescent, Bath in direct sunlight

Bath stone is an oolitic limestone comprising granular fragments of calcium carbonate originally obtained from the Middle Jurassic aged Great Oolite Group of the Combe Down and Bathampton Down Mines under Combe Down, Somerset, England. Its honey colouring gives the World Heritage City of Bath, England, its distinctive appearance. An important feature of Bath stone is that it is a 'freestone', so-called because it can be sawn or 'squared up' in any direction, unlike other rocks such as slate, which form distinct layers.

Bath stone has been used extensively as a building material throughout southern England, for churches, houses, and public buildings such as railway stations.

Some quarries are still in use, but the majority have been converted to other purposes or are being filled in.

== Geological formation ==
Bath stone is an oolitic limestone comprising granular fragments of calcium carbonate laid down during the Jurassic Period (195 to 145 million years ago) when the region that is now Bath was under a shallow sea. Layers of marine sediment were deposited, and individual spherical grains were coated with lime as they rolled around the sea bed, forming the Bathonian Series of rocks. Under the microscope, these grains or ooliths (egg stones) are sedimentary rock formed from ooids: spherical grains composed of concentric layers. That name derives from the Hellenic word òoion for egg. Strictly, oolites consist of ooids of diameter 0.25–2 mm. Rocks composed of ooids larger than 2 mm are called pisolites. They frequently contain minute fragments of shell or rock, and sometimes even decayed skeletons of marine life. Bath stone was taken from the Bath Oolite Member and the Combe Down Member of the Chalfield Oolite Formation, part of the Great Oolite Group.

== Use as a building stone ==
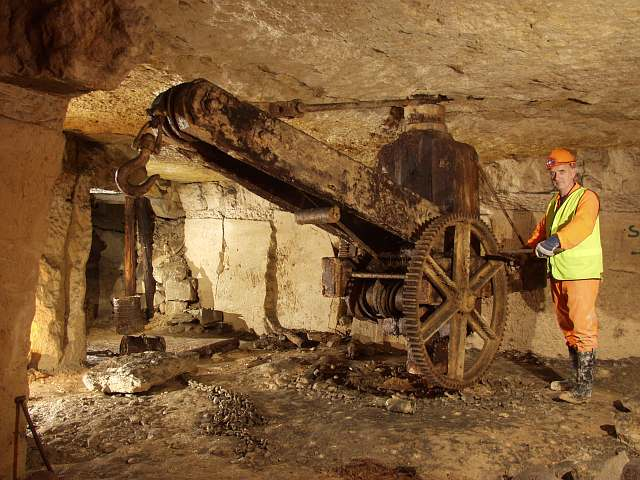
An old crane at Freshford Quarry

An important feature of Bath stone is that it is a freestone, one that can be sawn or 'squared up' in any direction, unlike other rocks such as slate, which have distinct layers. In the Roman and medieval periods, Bath stone was extensively used on domestic and ecclesiastical buildings, as well as civil engineering projects such as bridges.

The Royal National Hospital for Rheumatic Diseases, which was founded in 1738, was designed by John Wood the Elder and built with Bath stone. There is a fine pediment on the building, again in Bath stone, which depicts the parable of the good Samaritan.

St Stephen’s Church on Lansdown Hill, Bath, was constructed from a limestone sourced from the Limpley Stoke mine, south of the city.

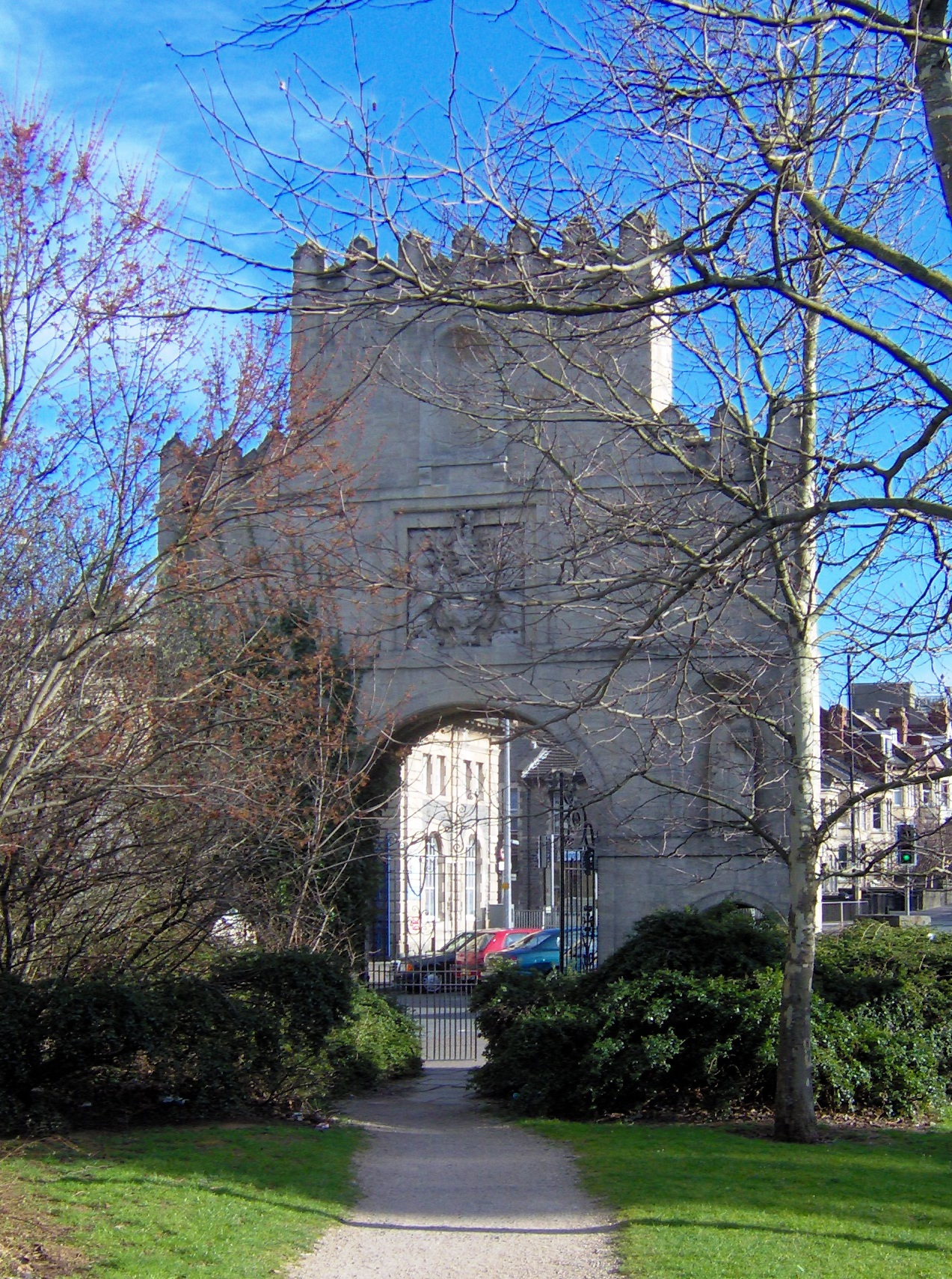
Arno's Court Triumphal Arch, Bristol

The material has also been used widely outside Bath itself. Claverton Pumping Station at Claverton, which was built of Bath stone in about 1810, pumps water from the River Avon to the Kennet and Avon Canal, using power from the flow of the River Avon. The stone was also used for the Dundas Aqueduct, which is 150 yards (137.2 m) long, and has three arches built of Bath stone, with Doric pilasters, and balustrades at each end.

Much of Bristol Cathedral was built of Bath stone, and the Wills Tower, which is the dominant feature of the Wills Memorial Building, is constructed in reinforced concrete faced with Bath and Clipsham stone. Bristol's Cabot Tower was also faced with Bath stone. Arno's Court Triumphal Arch was built from Bath stone in about 1760, and was later dismantled before being rebuilt in its current location.

Bath stone was also favoured by architect Hans Price, who designed much of 19th-century Weston-super-Mare. In Barnstaple, the 1855 construction of Butchers Row used Bath stone.

In London, the neo-classical Georgian mansion Lancaster House was built from Bath stone in 1825 for the Duke of York and Albany, the second son of King George III, as were St Luke's Church, Chelsea, in 1824, and several other churches including Church of Christ the King, Bloomsbury. Apsley House, the town house of the Dukes of Wellington, was remodelled by the 1st Duke in Bath stone cladding over the original red brick.

In Reading, the original building of the Royal Berkshire Hospital of 1839, together with the wings added in the 1860s, are built of Bath stone, with slate roofs. They are now listed grade II* by English Heritage. In 1860, the nearby Reading railway station, incorporating a tower and clock, was constructed by the Great Western Railway using Bath stone, and the company also used it for Chippenham station.

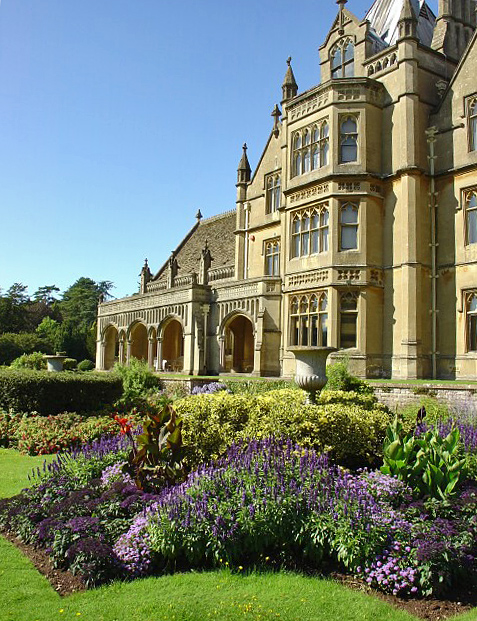
Tyntesfield

Other mansions which have used Bath stone include Gatcombe Park, Goldney Hall, Tyntesfield, South Hill Park, and Spetchley Park.

In 2002 the East End of Truro Cathedral was completely renovated and restored with some of the ornate Bath stone replaced with harder-wearing Syreford stone. In 2005 the west front was restored similarly.

== Mines ==
Bath stone was mined underground at Combe Down and Bathampton Down Mines, in Somerset; and as a result of cutting the Box Tunnel, at various locations in Wiltshire, including Box and Corsham.

In the early 18th century, Ralph Allen promoted the use of the stone in Bath itself, and demonstrated its potential by using it for his own mansion at Prior Park. Following a failed bid to supply stone to buildings in London, Allen wanted a building which would show off the properties of Bath stone as a building material. He acquired the stone quarries at Combe Down and Bathampton Down Mines. Hitherto, the quarry masons had always hewn stone roughly providing blocks of varying size. Wood required stone blocks to be cut with crisp, clean edges for his distinctive classical façades. The distinctive honey-coloured Bath Stone was used to build the Georgian city. Stone was extracted by the "room and pillar" method, by which chambers were mined, leaving pillars of stone to support the roof. Allen built a railway line from his mine on Combe Down which carried the stone down the hill, now known as Ralph Allen Drive, which runs beside Prior Park, to a wharf he constructed at Bath Locks on the Kennet and Avon Canal to transport stone to London.

In the 18th century mines at Budbury near Bradford on Avon and Corsham the mines were developed by the Methuen and Northey families. The mine at Monkton Farleigh was leased to quarrymen by the Diocese of Salisbury.

Underground extraction of Bath stone continues in the Corsham area but on a smaller scale than previously. For example, Hanson Bath & Portland Stone, part of the HeidelbergCement Group, operates Hartham Park Underground Quarry in the Hudswell district (southwest of Pickwick). The Bath Stone Group operates the Stoke Hill mine.

=== Box Mine ===
The Box Mine consists of a network of tunnels, which originate from stone mining work. Stone extraction started during the Roman occupation of Britain and ceased in 1968. The mine is now popular for recreational underground trips, and is home to a large population of bats. Up to 10% of the total British population of greater horseshoe bat uses the mine at times, and a maximum of 230 individuals of the species have been counted at the site. The Lesser Horseshoe Bat also uses the mine, as do the four Myotis species: Whiskered, Brandt's, Natterer's and Daubenton's bats.

=== Combe Down and Bathampton Down Mines ===
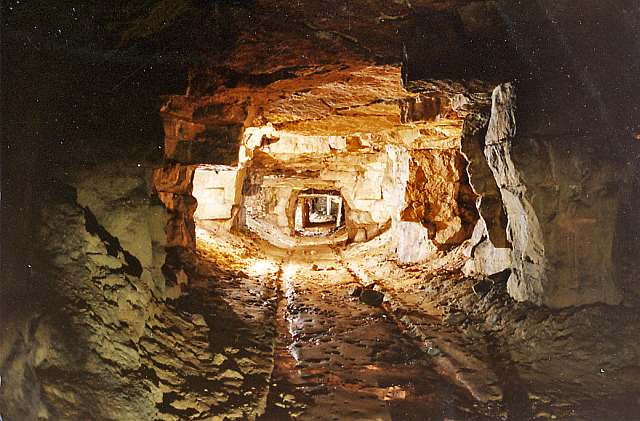
Combe Down Mine showing a tramway

Combe Down and Bathampton Down Mines date from the 17th and 18th century when stone was extracted by the "room and pillar" method, by which chambers were mined, leaving pillars of stone between them to support the roof. The mine contains a range of mine features including well preserved tramways, cart-roads and crane bases. The walls and pillars of the mine are studded with pick and tool marks, and show evidence of the use of huge stone saws, all of which bear testimony to the variety of techniques used to extract the stone over the mine's three hundred-year history. No mine abandonment plans of either the tunnels or the caverns, known as voids, were made prior to the 1872 Mining Act. Following their closure, the mines were used for a variety of purposes, including a mushroom farm, and as an air-raid shelter during the World War II Baedeker raids on Bath.

== Other uses of stone mines ==
During the 1930s there was a recognition of a need to provide secure storage for munitions in the south of the United Kingdom, and a large area of the quarries around the Corsham area was renovated by the Royal Engineers as one of three major munitions stockpiles. This ammunition depot was serviced by a spur railway line from the main London to Bristol line, branching off just outside the eastern entrance to Box Tunnel. A portion of the underground quarry complex was developed as a 'shadow factory' for aircraft engines, to act as a fallback should the Bristol Engine company Factory at Filton be taken out of action by hostile bombing. In practice this factory was never used.

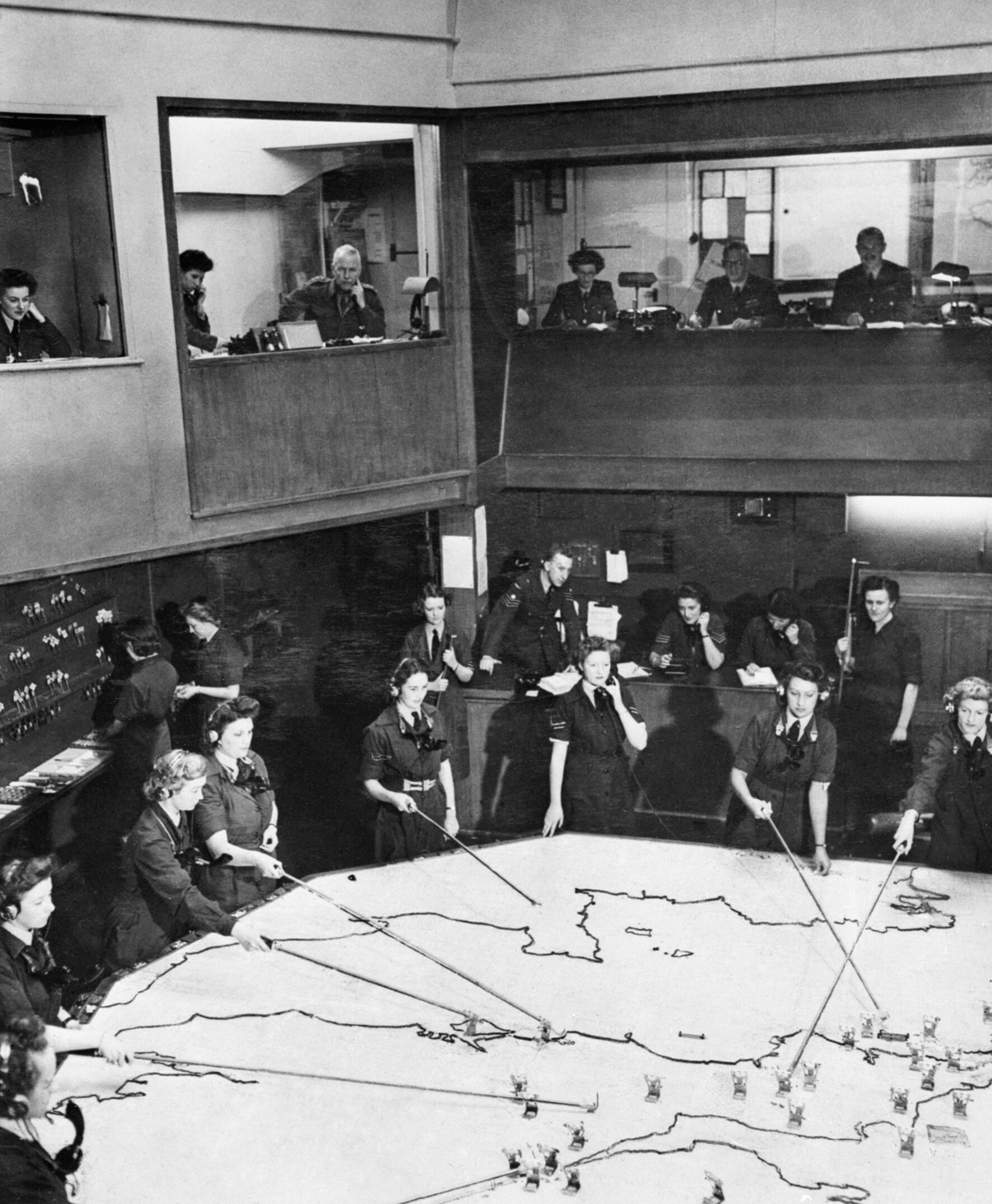
The Operations Room at RAF Fighter Command's No. 10 Group Headquarters, Rudloe Manor, Wiltshire, showing WAAF plotters and duty officers at work, 1943

In another part of the quarry area, Royal Air Force Box was established as the Headquarters of No10 Fighter Group, Royal Air Force. RAF Box was later renamed RAF Rudloe Manor and expanded to encompass a number of communications functions, including No1 Signal Unit, Controller Defence Communications Network, No1001 Signal Unit Detachment and Headquarters RAF Provost & Security Service. No1SU and CDCN were both housed in bunkers within the quarry complex, which also included an RAF Regional Command Centre for the South West of England.

British defence doctrine during the early Cold War period indicated a requirement for a fallback location for central government outside London, to assume national control in the event of London being destroyed. The quarry complex at Corsham was chosen for this location and development of the site commenced in the 1950s. In the event of an imminent nuclear attack, it was assumed that the government would be evacuated from London by rail or helicopter. The facility would provide a safe haven for the Prime Minister, the Cabinet, commanders of the Royal Air Force, Royal Navy, and British Army and supporting civil servants and military personnel. Facilities inside the complex included accommodation and catering for nearly 4,000 people, including a hospital, organic electrical generation and the ability to seal the complex from the outside environment, contaminated by radiation or other threat.

The defence facilities known by various code names like Stockwell, Turnstile, Hawthorn and Burlington have been built in quarries include Military Command & Control, storage and a fallback seat of national government. Some areas of the quarry complex were hardened and provided with support measures to ensure resilience in the event of a nuclear attack. The site was decommissioned and placed in a state of care & maintenance in the mid 1990s following the fragmentation of the Soviet Union and the end of the cold war. The site has been offered for sale, conditional on a Private Finance Initiative for the continued use of above ground facilities.

Corsham Computer Centre was built into Hudswell Quarry during the 1980s and current examples of other uses include not only defence establishments, but also a wine cellar at Eastlays (near Gastard) and storage for magnetic media (for Off-site Data Protection) at Monk's Park (near Neston).

The mine at Monkton Farleigh was used as a Central Ammunition Depot during World War II. Part of the site which was not used by the military is now a part of the Brown's Folly site of special scientific interest.

== Mine rehabilitation ==
During 1989 a utilities contractor unexpectedly broke through into part of the mines complex at Combe Down whilst excavating a trench. This raised concerns locally, resulting in the then Bath City Council commissioning studies to survey the condition of the mines. It was clear that the mines were in a very dangerous state and some experts considered them to be the largest, shallowest, and most unstable of their kind in Europe. Approximately 80% of the mines, which are up to 9 metres (30 ft) high and cover a total area of about 18 hectares (180,000 m^{2}), had less than 6 metres (20 ft) cover and as little as 2 metres (7 ft) in some places.

In March 1999, the then Department of Environment, Transport and Regions (DETR), now known as the Department for Communities and Local Government, announced a Land Stabilisation Programme, based on the Derelict Land Act 1982. A Parliamentary Statutory Instrument (2002 No. 2053) was needed before the work could be undertaken. Foam concrete was selected as the best material to use in the large-scale infilling of the old mine workings. Over 400,000 cubic metres (523,180 cu yd) of foamed concrete were placed in the shallower underground mines, making it the single largest application of foamed concrete in the United Kingdom.

== See also ==
- List of types of limestone – Limestone deposits listed by location
