= Edinburgh Castle, Jamaica =

Edinburgh Castle
- Plantation and Great House
- Location within Jamaica
- Coordinates: 18.2466843°N 77.2020167°W
- Country: Jamaica
- Parish: St Ann
- Built: c. 1770
- Founder: Lewis Hutchinson
- Named for: Edinburgh Castle, Edinburgh, Scotland
- Time zone: UTC-5 (EST)

Edinburgh Castle, an estate and now ruined great house in Saint Ann, was built by Jamaica's earliest recorded serial killer, Lewis Hutchinson. It had two circular, loopholed towers diagonally at opposite corners. The ruins are on the list of National Heritage Sites in Jamaica.

There is a small nearby village of the same name at 18.240591°N 77.219414°W.

There is also a small settlement of this name in St Thomas at 17.9004029°N 76.5824533°W

== In popular media ==
- In Assassin's Creed III, the decaying abandoned Edinburgh Castle can be explored by the game's fictional protagonist Connor Kenway, in search for one of the pieces of Captain Kidd's treasure map which ended up in Lewis Hutchinson's private collection after he supposedly killed Joseph Palmer only for it to be stolen by another of Hutchinson's victims.

== See also ==
- Jamaica National Heritage Trust
- List of Plantation Great Houses in Jamaica
