= Oxford Cave, Jamaica =

Cave in Jamaica

Oxford Cave
- Location within Jamaica
- Location: Manchester Parish, Jamaica
- Coordinates: 18°12′25″N 77°37′33″W
- Depth: N/A
- Length: 765 metres (2,510 ft)
- Entrances: 1

Oxford Cave is a cave in Manchester Parish in west-central Jamaica. It is 765 metres long and at 290 metres altitude. The cave entrance is close by a main road and because of its accessibility has suffered much graffiti, vandalism and litter. It is a roost for a great many bats, but these are under threat from the number of anti-social human visitors, many there to collect bat guano to use as farm fertiliser, others for bashments.

== See also ==
- List of caves in Jamaica
- Jamaican Caves Organisation
- Manchester Parish, Jamaica
