= Lewis Hutchinson =

Jamaican serial killer

- Born: 1733; Scotland
- Died: 16 March 1773 (aged 39–40); Spanish Town, Colony of Jamaica
- Other names: Mad Master; Mad Doctor of Edinburgh Castle
- Occupation: Slave owner
- Years active: 1760s–1773
- Status: Executed by hanging
- Conviction: Murder
- Penalty: Death

Details
- Victims: 40+
- Country: Colony of Jamaica

Lewis Hutchinson (1733–1773), a Scottish immigrant to Jamaica, was the first recorded serial killer in Jamaica's history and one of its most prolific.

== Early life ==
Hutchinson, better known as the Mad Master and Mad Doctor of Edinburgh Castle, was born in Scotland in 1733 where he is believed to have studied medicine.

== Criminal career ==
In the 1760s, he came to Jamaica to head an estate called Edinburgh Castle. He was said to have legally obtained the house (now a ruin) but to have maintained his group of cattle through the theft of strays from neighbours. This would not be the only accusation made against Hutchinson. For many miles, Edinburgh Castle was the only populated location on the way from Saint Ann's Bay, and, not knowing that they would become the target of Hutchinson's rifle, travellers would rest at the castle, only to succumb to the Mad Doctor's attack. Hutchinson murdered for pure sport, what may be described as a thrill killing, as passers-by from all races, shapes, sizes, and incomes were fair game.

What is true about Hutchinson's killings is debatable. He would shoot lone travellers and was said to feed on the flow of his victims' blood as well as dismember them. He or, according to some sources, his slaves would then toss the remains in a cotton tree or a sinkhole for animals to feast on. That sinkhole became known as Hutchinson's Hole. At the height of his crimes, he would invite guests to his castle to be entertained before killing them.

== Capture ==
Hutchinson's reputation for debauchery made him notable as many would avoid him out of fear. His slaves' tales of terrible treatment and the gruesome details of the murders made him legendary. This is why he was allowed to roam free for a time until he shot an English soldier by the name of John Calendar, who attempted to apprehend Hutchinson. After Hutchinson shot Calendar, he bolted south to Old Harbour and boarded a ship. The Royal Navy, commanded by Admiral Rodney, caught Hutchinson before he could escape.

== Trial and execution ==
Shortly after being caught, he was tried and found guilty. In 1773, he was hanged in Spanish Town Square. Although the final toll is unknown, upon searching his home after his arrest, approximately 43 watches and a large amount of clothing was found. The records of his trial stand in the National Archives and in the Jamaican Archives.

== Accomplices ==
During the trial, slaves' stories revealed he did not act alone. Planter James Walker and Roger Maddix were sentenced to death for participating in the murder of farmer William Lickley and schoolmaster Timothy Cronin. Maddix's wife, Dorcas, Miss Susanna Cole and Miss Elizabeth Thomas allegedly watched schoolmaster Cronin's death by strangulation while pinioned in stocks. Cronin's watch and seal were found in Thomas' possession. Miss Thomas was acquitted.

== In popular culture ==
In Assassin's Creed III, fictional protagonist Connor Kenway visits Hutchinson's abandoned Edinburgh Castle, Jamaica in 1776 (three years after Hutchinson was hanged) in search of Joseph Palmer's piece of Captain Kidd's treasure map, which was implied to have ended up in Hutchinson's private museum.

== See also ==
- List of serial killers by country

== Bibliography ==
- Cundall, Frank, 1915, Historic Jamaica p. 295ff, Institute of Jamaica. Archive.org
- Black, C.V., 1966, Tales of Old Jamaica, Longman Caribbean Ltd.
- Black, C.V., 1983, The History of Jamaica, Longman Caribbean Ltd.
