= Bath and Bradford-on-Avon Bats SAC =

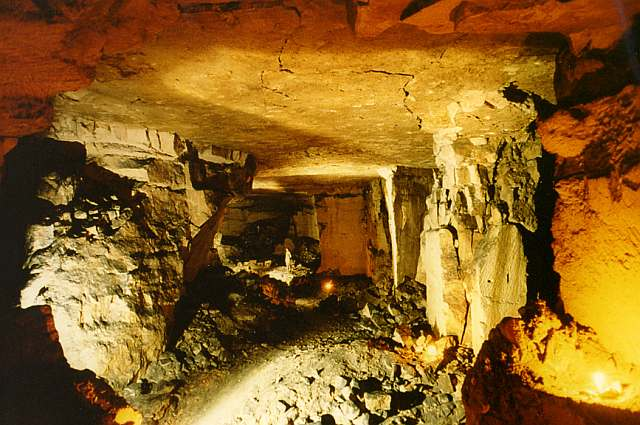
The Farleigh Down Quarry, near Bathford

The Bath and Bradford-on-Avon Bats SAC is a Special Area of Conservation originally designated under the European Union's Habitats Directive (92/43/EEC), also known as the Directive on the Conservation of Natural Habitats and of Wild Fauna and Flora.

== Extent and purpose ==
The SAC covers ten separate areas within four Sites of Special Scientific Interest: two in Somerset, Brown's Folly, near Bathford, and Combe Down and Bathampton Down Mines, near Bath; and two in Wiltshire, Box Mine and Winsley Mines. These ten areas are all abandoned limestone mines, but in some cases they were designated together with nearby areas of supporting habitat, which is either broadleaved woodland or calcareous grassland. The surrounding undesignated landscape provides further forage for bats.

The designation of the SAC is for the protection of hibernating populations of three species of bat, lesser horseshoe, greater horseshoe, and Bechstein's bat. However, it is uncertain whether Bechstein's bats hibernate in caves and mines.

Other neighbouring Special Areas of Conservation for the benefit of bats are the Mells Valley SAC, the Chilmark Quarries SAC, and the North Somerset and Mendip Bats SAC.
