= Box Mine =

Mine in Wiltshire, England

Coordinates: 51.41978°N 2.23436°W

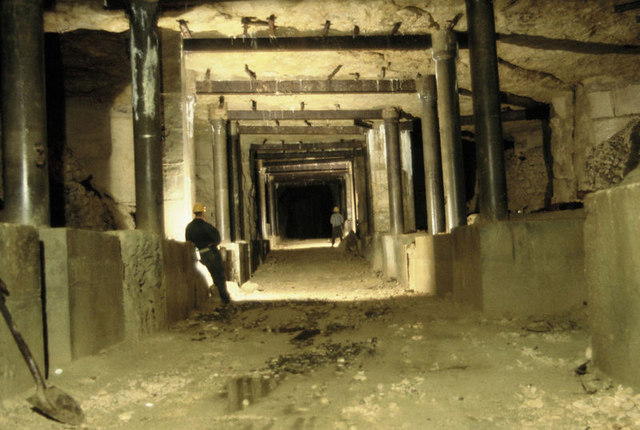
Spring Mine

Box Mine (grid reference ST838690) is a 56.6 ha (139.9 acres) biological Site of Special Scientific Interest, near the village of Box in Wiltshire, England, notified in 1991.

The site forms part of the Bath and Bradford-on-Avon Bats Special Area of Conservation.

== Site description ==
The Mine consists of a network of tunnels, which originate from Bath stone mining work, initially started during the Roman occupation of Britain. Several entrances to the mine system are present in wooded quarries.

== Biological interest ==
The site's chief biological interest lies in its roosting bats. Although the site is used year-round, it is mainly a site used for hibernation, breeding, and post-breeding dispersal. It is thought that the mines provide stable humidity and even temperatures when compared to smaller sites, and this encourages use by bats, particularly outside the breeding season.

Up to 10% of the total British population of greater horseshoe bat uses the mine at times; a maximum of 230 individuals of this species have been counted at the site. Lesser Horseshoe Bat also uses the mine, as do the four Myotis species – Whiskered, Brandt's, Natterer's and Daubenton's bats.

== Sources ==
- Natural England citation sheet for the site (accessed 22 March 2022)
- "Bath and Bradford-on-Avon Bats Special Area of Conservation" (PDF). Natural England. 20 March 2019.
