= Smokey Hole Cave =

Deepest known cave in Jamaica

- Location within Jamaica
- Location: Manchester, Jamaica
- Coordinates: 17°54′03″N 77°30′26″W
- Depth: 195 metres (640 ft)
- Length: 250 metres (820 ft)

At nearly 200 metres, Smokey Hole Cave in Manchester, Jamaica is the deepest known cave in the island.

== Natural history ==
The cave contains a large bat roost and numerous Jamaican cave crickets (Uvaroviella cavicola). Also present are the invasive Periplaneta americana (cockroach) in small numbers, Gaucelmus cavernicola (spider), and Neoditomyia farri (fly).

== See also ==
- List of caves in Jamaica
- Jamaican Caves Organisation
- Manchester Parish, Jamaica
