= Winsley Mines =

Site of Special Scientific Interest in England

Coordinates: 51.34501°N 2.29572°W

Winsley Mines (grid reference ST795607) is a 1.48 hectare biological Site of Special Scientific Interest, near the village of Winsley in Wiltshire, England, notified in 1989.

The site is a hibernation roost for the Greater Horseshoe bat, and forms part of the Bath and Bradford-on-Avon Bats Special Area of Conservation.

== Sources ==
- Natural England citation sheet for the site (accessed 25 May 2023)
- "Bath and Bradford-on-Avon Bats Special Area of Conservation" (PDF). Natural England. 20 March 2019.
