= Combe Down and Bathampton Down Mines =

Protected area in Somerset, England

Combe Down and Bathampton Down Quarries
- Site of Special Scientific Interest
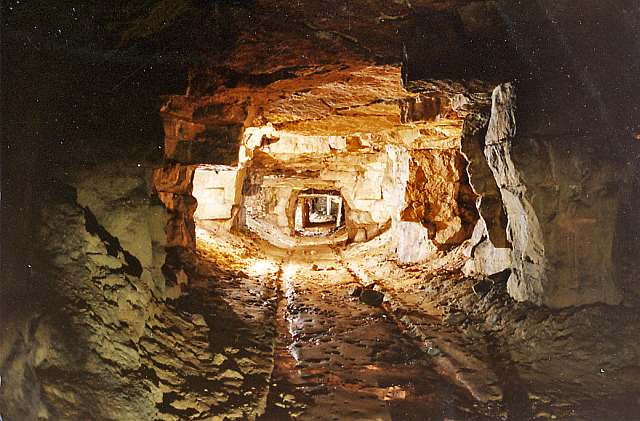

- Location within Somerset
- Location of Combe Down and Bathampton Down Quarries.
- Area of search: Avon
- Grid reference: ST761625
- Coordinates: 51.36106°N 2.34465°W
- Interest: Biological
- Area: 15.37 acres (0.0622 km^{2}; 0.02402 sq mi)
- Notification date: 1991

Combe Down and Bathampton Down Quarries (grid reference ST761625) make up a 6.22 hectare (15.37 acre) Site of Special Scientific Interest (SSSI) in Bath and North East Somerset, England, important for its bat population. The disused quarries date from the 17th and 18th centuries and were the source of Bath stone for the city of Bath and elsewhere in the UK. A five-year project to stabilise the quarry workings was largely completed by November 2009.

== Geology ==
Combe Down forms a plateau capped by Great Oolite limestones between the valley of the River Avon and Horsecombe Vale. The geology of the region is dominated by rocks of Middle and Early Jurassic ages. The Great Oolite is the uppermost lithology, underlain by the clays of the Fuller's Earth Formation, which in turn is underlain by limestones of the Inferior Oolite and the Midford Sands of the Lias. The Great and Inferior Oolite formations provide effective aquifers (rock in which water can be stored and pass through) for public and private water supplies.

== History ==
The stone from the Great Oolite Group (Forest Marble, Bath Oolite, Twinhoe Beds and Combe Down Oolite), used for building purposes, formed over 146 million years ago when the area was underneath a deep tropical sea on which ooliths were deposited. The ooliths bonded together to form the distinctive rock known as oolitic limestone or locally as Bath stone. The Romans found that it was easily worked and used it for important fortifications. During the 17th century, small quarries were opened, with major quarries being developed in the 18th century to produce the stone used for many of the buildings in Bath and elsewhere in the UK, including Buckingham Palace. Stone was extracted by the "room and pillar" method, by which chambers were mined, leaving pillars of stone to support the roof. These mines were once owned by Postmaster General Ralph Allen (1694–1764).

The mines contain a range of features including well preserved tramways, cart-roads and crane bases. The walls and pillars are studded with pick and tool marks and show evidence of the use of huge stone saws, all of which bear testimony to the variety of techniques used to extract the stone over their three hundred-year history.

No mine abandonment plans – either of the tunnels or the caverns, known as voids – were made prior to the 1872 Mining Act.

During 1989 a utilities contractor unexpectedly broke through into part of the mine complex whilst excavating a trench, which resulted in Bath City Council commissioning studies to survey the condition of the mines. It was clear that the mines were in very unstable condition, and some experts considered them to be the largest, shallowest and most unstable of their kind in Europe.

== Mine and environmental survey ==
An underground survey of the Firs and Byfield mine areas was carried out in 1994, commissioned by Bath City Council. It was found that approximately 80% of the mines had less than 6 m cover, reducing to 2 m in some places. Irregular mining and robbing stone from supporting pillars had left the mines unstable.

An Environmental Impact Assessment was completed for the stabilisation scheme and submitted to the Local Planning Authority in December 2002. This highlighted that the mine is within the World Heritage Site of the City of Bath; adjacent to the Cotswold Area of Outstanding Natural Beauty (AONB); within a conservation area, containing a number of listed buildings; a Site of Special Scientific Interest; a candidate Special Area of Conservation; of international importance for Greater and Lesser Horseshoe bats; and of international geological importance, partly due to the work of William Smith.

During the access and emergency works, Oxford Archaeology produced large scale plans of visible areas and substantial photography was carried out as the modern roadways allowed access. There were also trials of video photography and laser scanning, so that a substantial record was produced of some 20% of the known workings.

The mine also lies above a Grade 1 aquifer from which water for public and private use is extracted via the springs that issue at the base of these units, in particular at the Prior Park, Whittaker and Tucking Mill springs.

== Mine stabilisation project ==
In March 1999, the then Department of Environment, Transport and Regions (DETR) announced a Land Stabilisation Programme, based on the Derelict Land Act 1982. This was designed to "deal with abandoned non-coal mine workings which are likely to collapse and threaten life and property". A Bath and North East Somerset Council outline bid for a two-phase stabilisation project was accepted in August 1999, by English Partnerships who administered the programme for the then Office of the Deputy Prime Minister. A parliamentary Statutory Instrument (2002 No. 2053) was needed before the work could be undertaken.

Approximately 760 properties were included within the planning application boundary; estimates were that ca. 1660 people lived within this area, which also included a primary school, a nursery and three churches.

Foamed concrete was selected for the large-scale infilling of the old mine works: the single largest application of foamed concrete on a project in the UK. The work was largely complete by November 2009, by which time approximately 600,000 cubic metres of foamed concrete had been used to fill 25 hectares of very shallow limestone mine, making it the largest project of its kind in the world.

== Biological interest ==
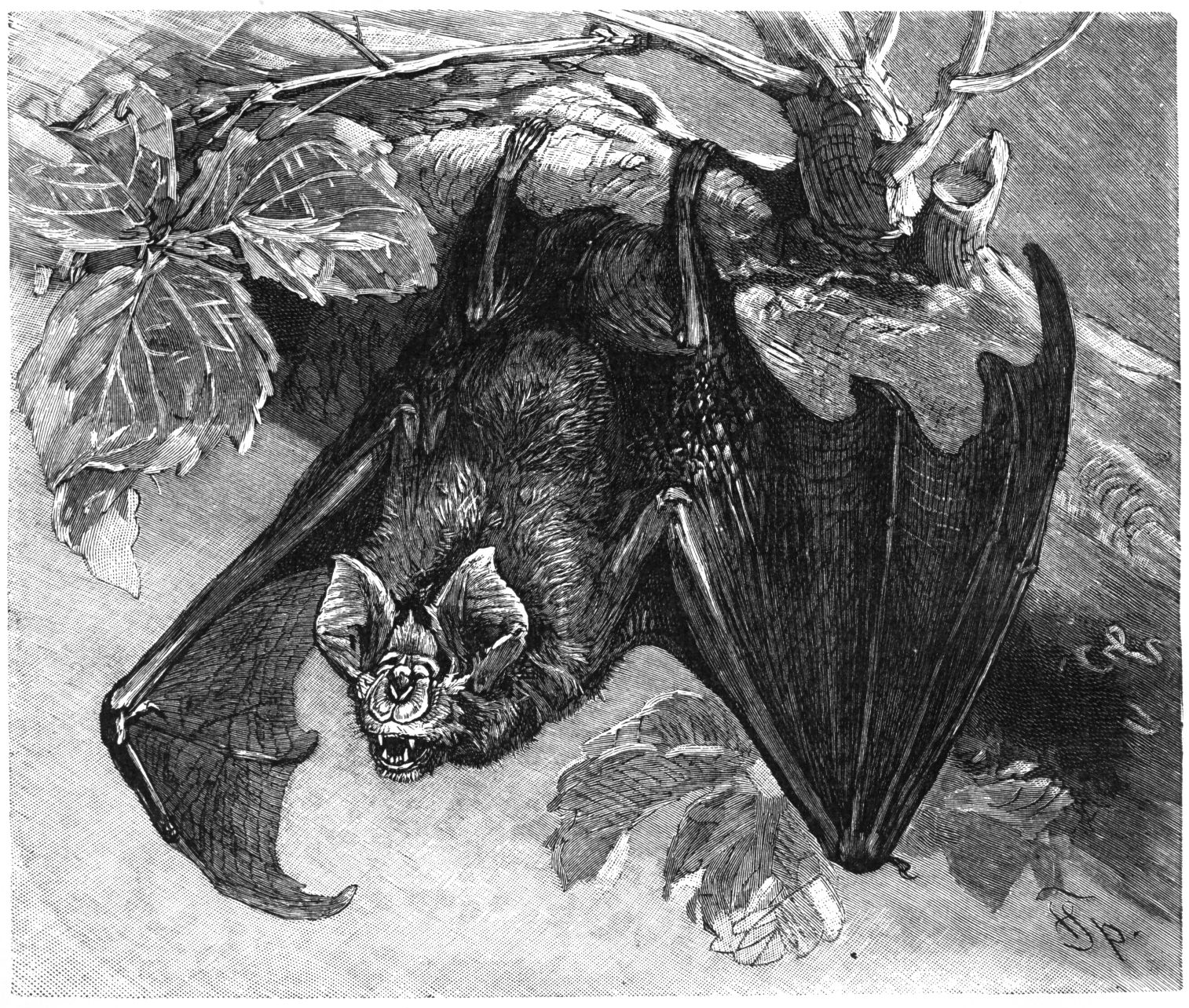
Greater Horseshoe bat

The site was notified as a Site of Special Scientific Interest in 1991, for its importance as a hibernation site for several species of bat, including Greater and Lesser Horseshoe. Since 2005 it has formed part of the Bath and Bradford-on-Avon Bats Special Area of Conservation.
