= Hutchinson's Hole =

Sinkhole in Saint Ann, Jamaica

Hutchinson’s Hole
- Location within Jamaica
- Location: Saint Ann Parish, Jamaica
- Coordinates: 18°14′41″N 77°12′56″W
- Depth: 98 metres (322 ft)
- Entrances: 1

Hutchinson's Hole is a large pit cave (located in Saint Ann in northern Jamaica) named after the 18th century serial killer Lewis Hutchinson, who used the sinkhole to dispose of bodies. Its depth is approximately 98 metres (322 ft), with a cave entrance some 5 by 3 metres widening to approximately 18 by 25 metres at the bottom.

The hole is believed to have claimed a number of victims since.
