= Cockpit Country =

Rugged area of Jamaica

- Geographical region
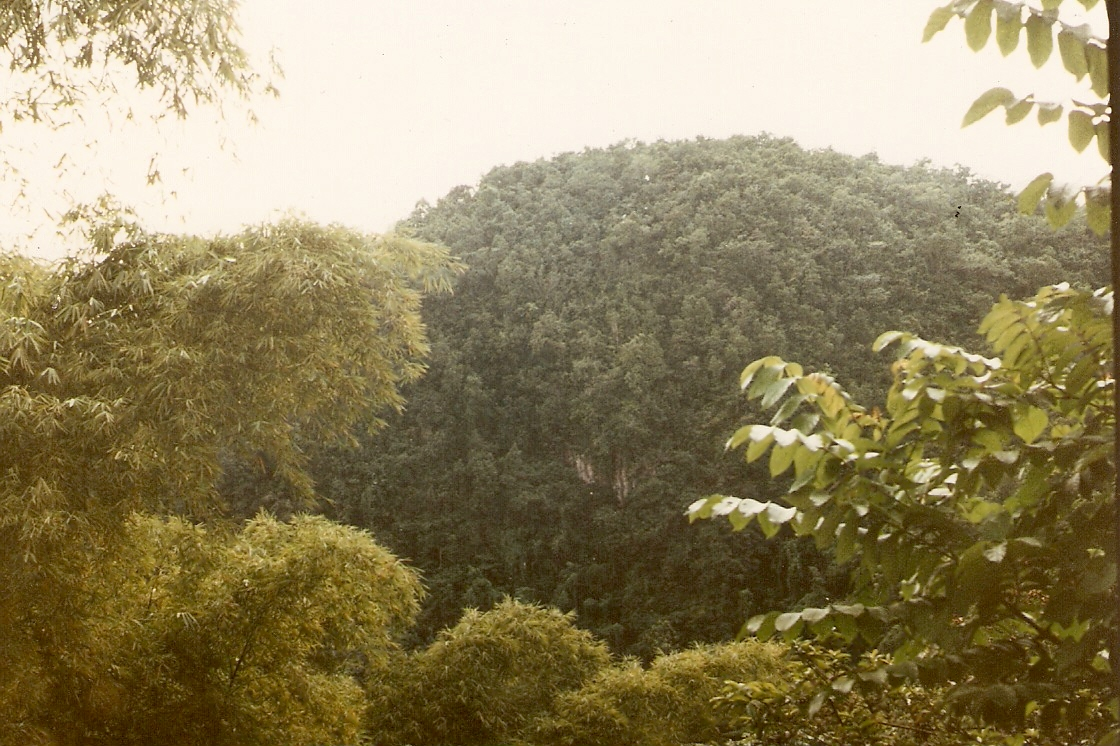

- Location within Jamaica
- Coordinates: 18.295209°N 77.695313°W
- Country: Jamaica
- Parish: Trelawny
- Named for: Topology reminiscent of the shape of cock fighting dens.
- Time zone: UTC-5 (EST)

Cockpit Country is an area in Trelawny and Saint Elizabeth, Saint James, Saint Ann, Manchester and the northern tip of Clarendon parishes, mostly within the west-central side, of Jamaica. The land is marked by lush, montane forests and steep-sided valleys and hollows, as deep as 120 metres (390 ft) in places, separated by conical hills and ridges.

During the 16th and 17th centuries, maroons—the escapee former slaves (and their descendants) of the island's Spanish and British-operated sugarcane plantations—used this rugged terrain to their benefit, carving out an existence on their own, away from the violent slavers and colonial powers of the lowlands.

== History ==
In the late seventeenth century, the Cockpit Country was a place of refuge for Jamaican Maroons fleeing slavery. During the course of the First Maroon War, there were two Leeward Maroon communities - Cudjoe's Town (Trelawny Town) and Accompong Town. Cudjoe's Town was located in the mountains in the southern extremities of Saint James Parish, Jamaica, close to the border of Westmoreland Parish. Accompong is situated just to the south of Cudjoe's Town, on the border between Westmoreland and Saint Elizabeth Parish.

When the Leeward Maroons signed a peace treaty in 1740, they assisted the colonial authorities in pursuing runaway slaves who sought refuge in the Cockpit Country. However, these runaways allied with Trelawny Town during the Second Maroon War. When the Maroons of Trelawny Town were deported in 1796, the Maroons of Accompong had difficulty policing the Cockpit Country, and several communities of runaway slaves established themselves there. After the removal of the Trelawny Maroons, the colonial militia built a barracks at their village, which they renamed Maroon Town, Jamaica.

At the start of the nineteenth century, Cuffee established a community of runaway slaves in the Cockpit Country, and resisted attempts by the colonial authorities and the Maroons of Accompong Town to rout them. Then, in the second and third decades of the century, another group of runaway slaves from Trelawny Parish set up a community in the Cockpit Country at Me-no-Sen-You-no-Come. They also succeeded in resisting attempts by the colonial militias and Accompong Town to rout them. During the Baptist War of 1831–2, more slaves ran away and found freedom in the Cockpit Country.

== Geography ==
On the north, the main defining feature is the fault-based "Escarpment", a long ridge that extends from Flagstaff in the west, through Windsor in the centre, to Campbells and the start of the Barbecue Bottom Road (B10). The Barbecue Bottom Road, which runs north–south, high along the side of a deep, fault-based valley in the east, is the only drivable route across the Cockpit Country. Walkers and riders can use two old, historical trails cross further west, the Troy Trail, and the Quick Step Trail. As of 2006 they are seldom used and difficult to find.

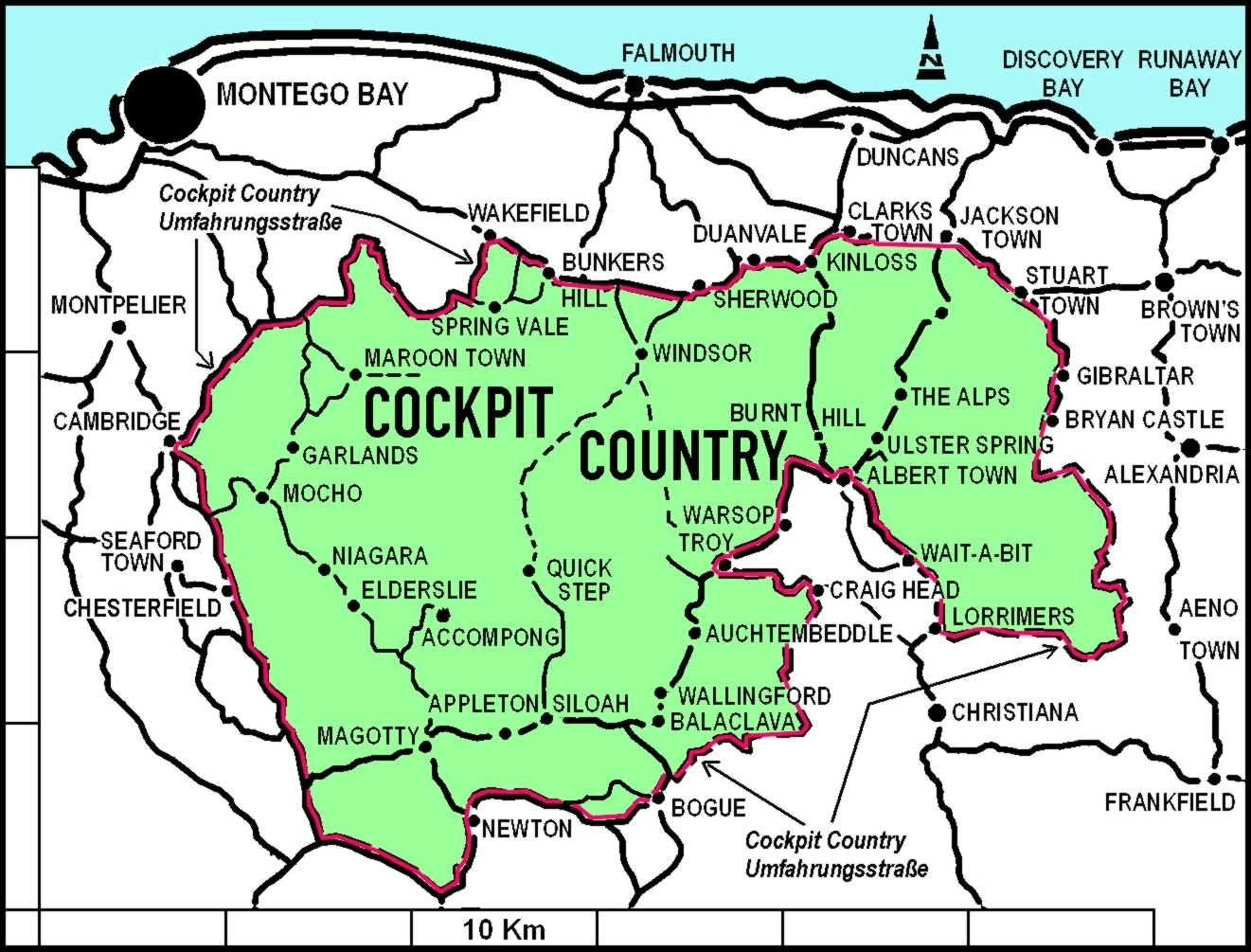
Map of Cockpit Country

In the southwest, near Quick Step, is the district known as the "Land of Look Behind." It was so named because Spanish horsemen venturing into this region of hostile escaped slaves were said to have ridden two to a mount, one rider facing to the rear to keep a precautionary watch against ambush.

Where the ridges between sinkholes in the plateau area have dissolved, flat-bottomed basins or valleys have been formed that are filled with terra rosa soils, some of the most productive on the island. The largest basin is the Vale of Clarendon, 80 kilometres (50 mi) long and 32 kilometres (20 mi) wide. Queen of Spains Valley, Nassau Valley, and Cave Valley were formed by the same process.

Shallow caves, known locally as cockpits, are particularly common around the hamlet of Quick Step, reaching a density of 15 per km^{2}. Noteworthy caves include Marta Tick Cave and Minocal's Glory Hole. Ecotourism has been proposed for the hamlet of Quick Step, at the end of the road into the heart of Cockpit County.

== Environment ==
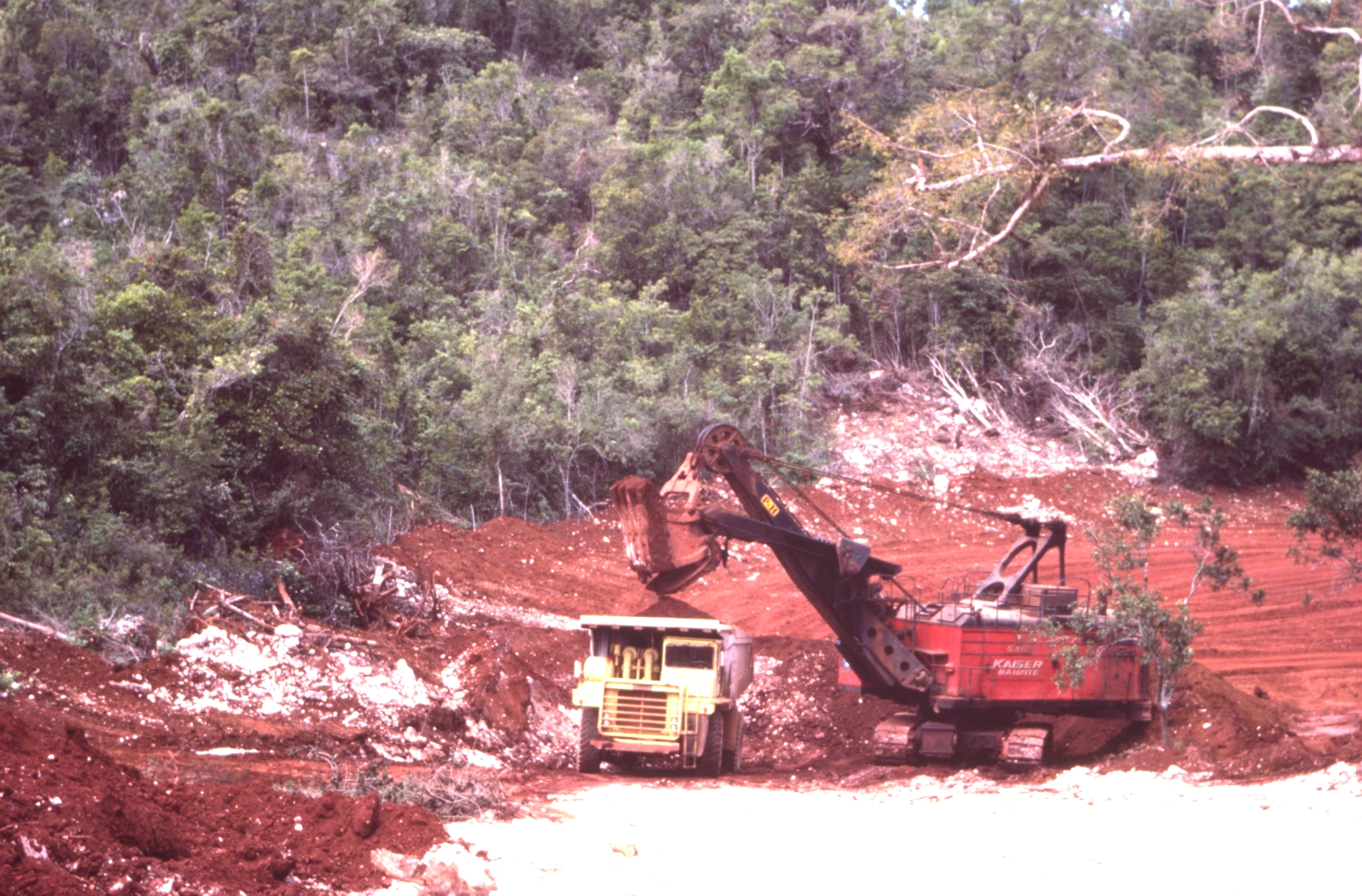
Bauxite is mined in Cockpit Country

The Cockpit Country is Jamaica's largest remaining contiguous rainforest. Cockpit Country Forest Reserve was designated in 1950, and covers an area of 221.75 km^{2}. In 1979 an unpublished paper proposed preserving the area as a National Park. In 1994 the geographer Alan Eyre proposed that the Cockpit Country be designated as a World Heritage Site to preserve its environment. A petition for protection of the area was submitted to Prime Minister Bruce Golding in 2006. In April 2013, public consultations began on the definition of the boundary proposed in a recently released study by Mitchell, Miller, Ganapathy, and Spence of the University of the West Indies (UWI).

=== Wildlife ===
Eleutherodactylus sisyphodemus, a small, critically endangered frog species, is known only from the Cockpit Country. Cockpit Country hosts 90% of the global population of black-billed amazon, a parrot endemic to Jamaica. Cockpit Country is also home to the Jamaican swallowtail, the largest butterfly in the Western Hemisphere. Cockpit Country is one of the last remaining homes for the species. The area has been designated an Important Bird Area (IBA) by BirdLife International because it supports significant populations of many Jamaican bird species.

== See also ==
- Geography of Jamaica
