= Jamaican Caves Organisation =

- Abbreviation: JCO
- Formation: January 1, 2002; 24 years ago
- Type: NGO
- Region served: Jamaica
- Website: www.jamaicancaves.org

The Jamaican Caves Organisation (JCO) is an all-volunteer caving organisation devoted to the preservation, exploration and documentation of caves in Jamaica. It is currently the only non-profit group in Jamaica dedicated to education, research and advocacy about caves.

== History ==
The Jamaican Caves Organisation (JCO) was established in 2002 by Ronald Stefan Stewart (ORCID: 0009-0008-7866-4057), Ivor Conolley, and Martel Taylor, with partial funding and technical assistance from The Nature Conservancy, and the Windsor Research Centre.

From 2002 onwards, projects have been carried out in St James, the Cockpit Country, and St Ann under a National Environment and Planning Agency (NEPA) wildlife research permit. Sites in other parishes, outside the project areas, have also been visited and assessed in collaboration with NEPA, the Water Resources Authority (WRA), The Jamaica Tourist Board (JTB), the Tourism Product Development Company (TPDCo), the Jamaica National Heritage Trust (JNHT), the Urban Development Corporation (UDC), the Archaeological Society of Jamaica (ASJ), the University of the West Indies (UWI), and various external research groups.

The JCO maintains the current version of the Jamaican Cave Register, now at over 1200 sites. Reports and data are welcome.

The current membership includes most of the principal cavers active in Jamaica during the last four decades, including Dr Alan G Fincham, Dr David Lee, Dr Donald McFarlane, David Eastwood, Guy Van Rentergem, Jan Pauel, Prof Silvia Kouwenberg, Dr Ivor Conolley, Andreas Haiduk, Ronald Stefan Stewart, and Adam Hyde.

Notable events in the history of the group include the first descent of Smokey Hole Cave, Manchester in March 2006, which established a new depth record for Jamaica of 194 metres, and the removal of the remains of Carlton Rose from the notorious Hutchinson's Hole, St Ann, in February 2004.

Non-caving underground activities have included the exploration and mapping of Stamford Hill Mine, Clarendon, abandoned in 1863, under contract to PanCaribbean Minerals.

== The JCO today ==
As of 2025, the JCO remains very active, and continues to carry out regular speleological research in Jamaica on in-house projects, and in collaboration with government agencies and visiting scientists. Recent work has included a research note on Neoditomyia farri accepted for publication by the Journal of Insect Science, the discovery of a new, very large roost for the endangered bat, Phyllonycteris aphylla, with publication in Oryx, a comprehensive assessment of the caves of Portland Ridge, sampling of deep guano deposits at two sites under a National Environment and Planning Agency of Jamaica (NEPA) permit that has supplied DNA and radioisotope data extending to 3400 BP, the discovery of a third entrance to the largest bat cave on the island, St Clair Cave, and completion of the master database for Jamaican caves, which will serve as the core of a third edition of the seminal work on the caves of the island, Jamaica Underground.

The organisation also serves as the reporting center for new discoveries, which are subsequently disseminated to pertinent government agencies, and published on the JCO website.
