= Coreca Reefs =

Coordinates: 39°05′41″N 16°04′49″E

The Coreca Reefs form a group of rocks of Italy located in the Tyrrhenian Sea, in Calabria in the Frazione of Coreca.

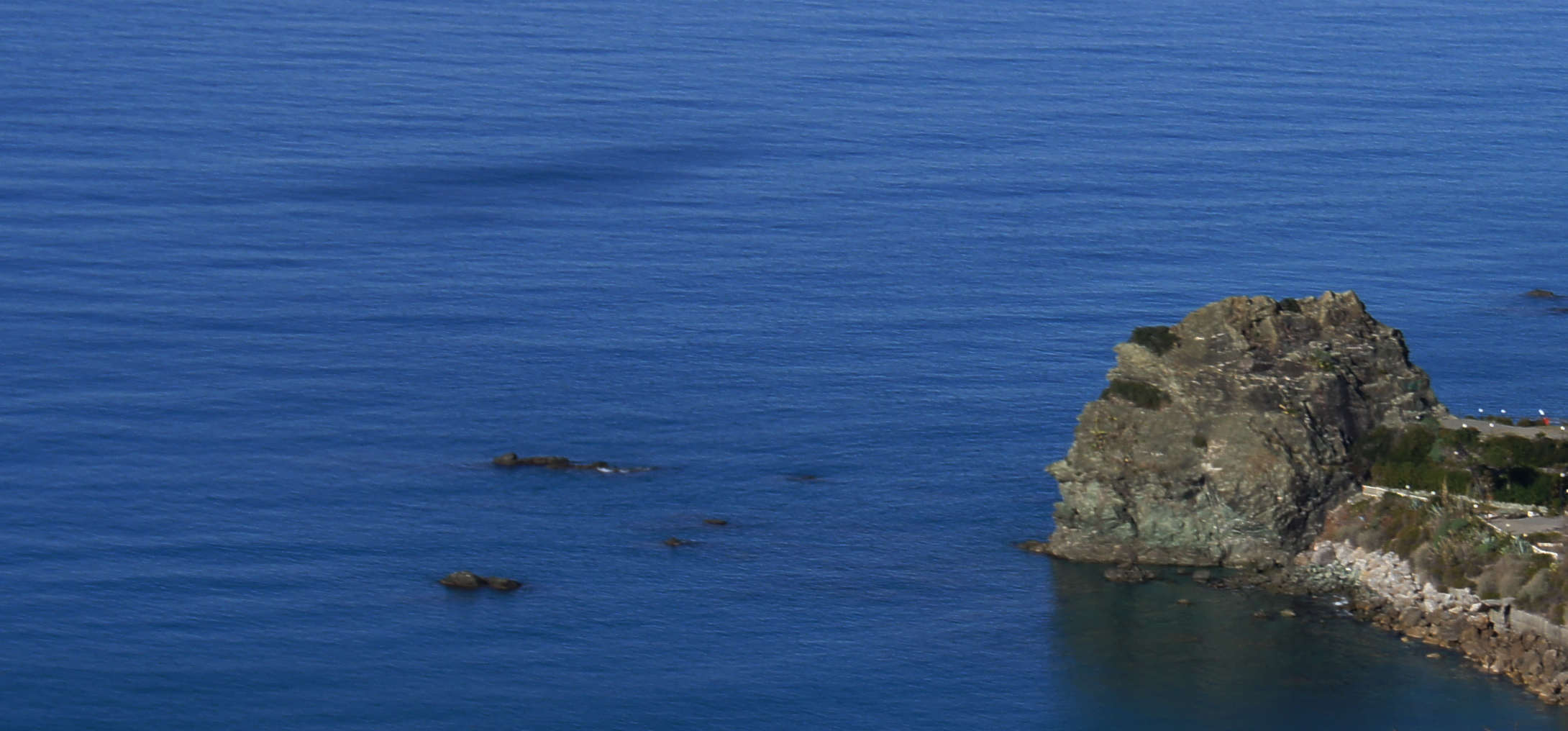
Coreca Reefs seen from Colle degli Ulivi

They are a group of ten rocks: Capoto (the largest of them), Formica, Ginario, Longarino, Piccirillo, Tirolé (also known as Pirolé) and the four Scuagli da Funtana have a distribution area from the nearby "La Tonnara" at the edge of the sea air of Coreca's main village.

Capoto is the largest of them with a surface area of 50 square metres (540 sq ft), and is mainly used for diving and for photographic and cinematographic amateur shootings.

During the 1960s, 1970s and 1980s, it was a destination for radio-amateurs and cameramen, and meta of environmental events such as the LIPU for the vast marine ornithological fauna that had completely disappeared now.

It administratively belongs to Amantea, the Italian municipality of the province of Cosenza.

== See also ==
- Coreca Caves
