= Campora San Giovanni =

Campora San Giovanni Càmpura Santu Janni (Neapolitan)
- Frazione
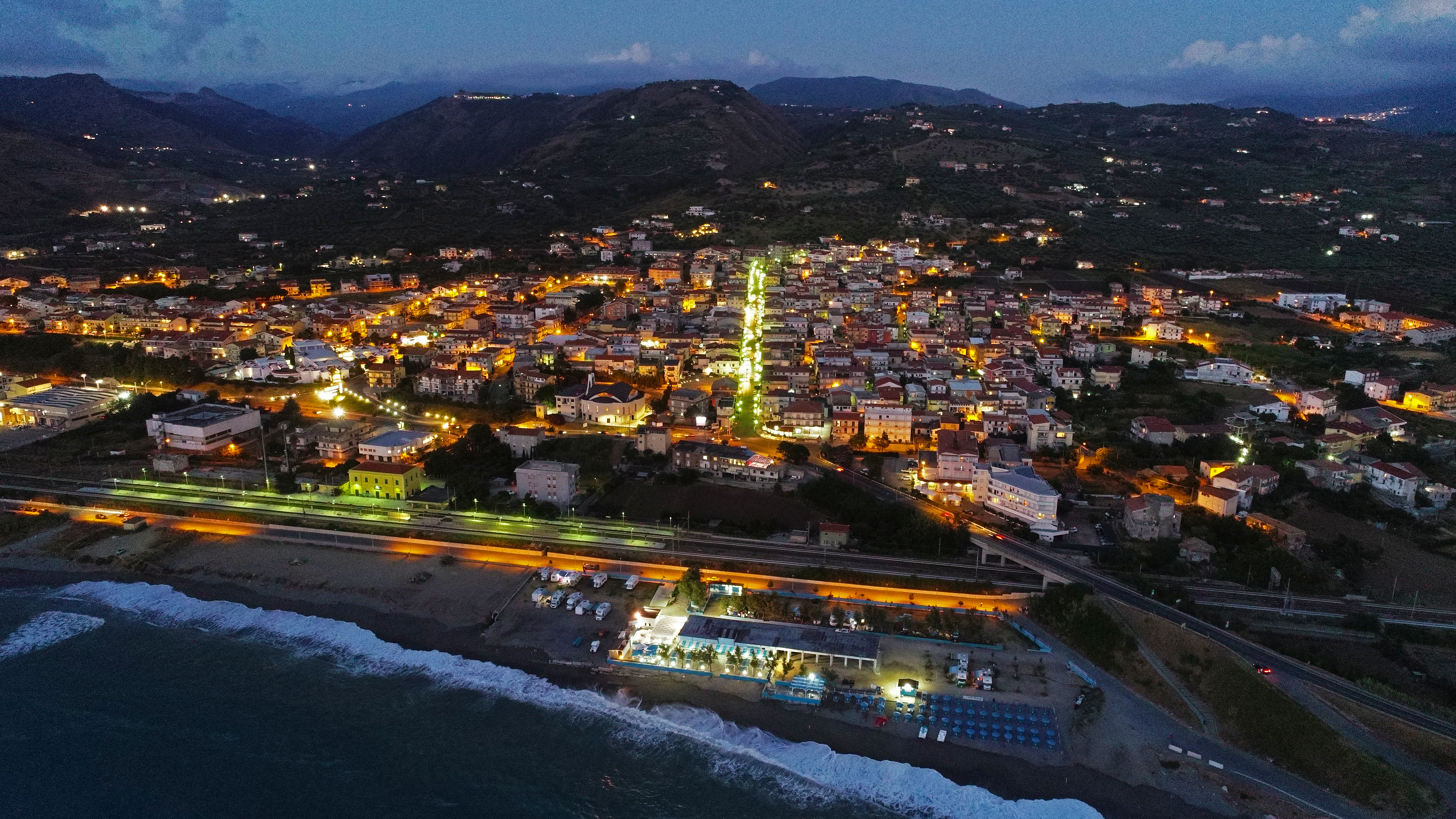

- Location of Campora San Giovanni in Italy
- Coordinates: 39°4′5″N 16°5′38″E
- Country: Italy
- Region: Calabria
- Province: Cosenza (CS)
- Comune: Amantea

Area
  - Total: 6.2 km^{2} (2.4 sq mi)
- Elevation: 55 m (180 ft)

Population (1 January 2012)
  - Total: 7,850
  - Density: 1,300/km^{2} (3,300/sq mi)
- Demonym: Camporesi (in English) Camporese
- Time zone: UTC+1 (CET)
  - Summer (DST): UTC+2 (CEST)
- Postal code: 87032
- Dialing code: 0982
- Patron saint: Francis of Paola
- Saint day: 1–3 September

Campora San Giovanni (Italian: [ˈkampora san dʒoˈvanni]; Camporese dialect: Càmpura San Giuvanni or Càmpura Santu Janni) is a frazione (borough) of the comune (municipality) of Amantea, in the province of Cosenza, Calabria, Italy, located close to the border with the province of Catanzaro.

== Geography ==
Campora San Giovanni overlooks the coast of the Tyrrhenian Sea. Since the 1950s, the village has grown and expanded on a small plateau that rises over a flat area close to the beach. The region is surrounded by a hill covered with vineyards and olive plantations. This hill slopes gently towards the region and offers an agreeable sight: on the left, the gulf of Lamezia Terme; in front, on the horizon line, Stromboli volcano can be seen on clear days.

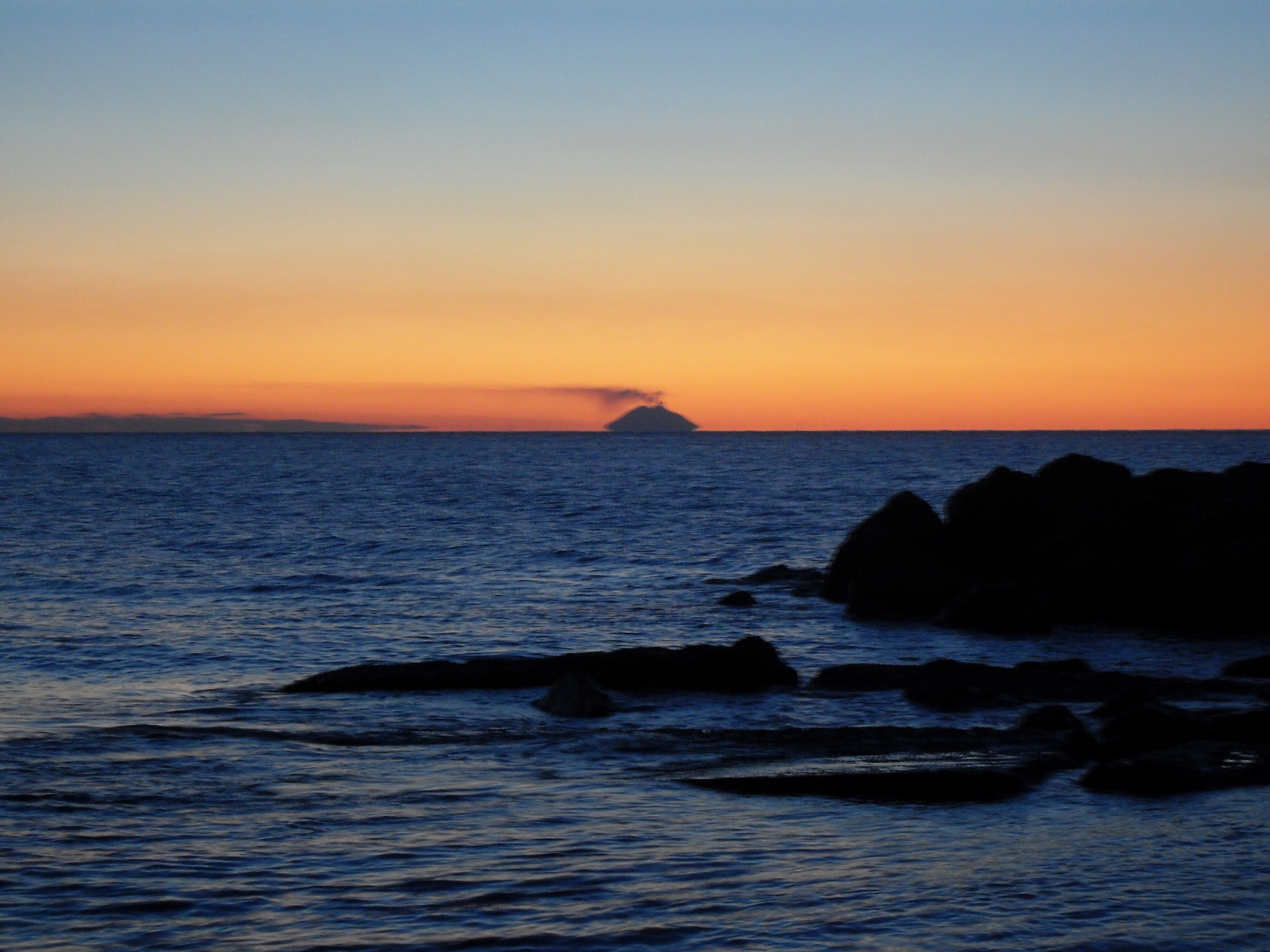
the volcano Stromboli seen from the Bay of Campora San Giovanni

The Aeolian Islands can be easily reached from the port of Campora.

=== Climate ===
Climate data for Campora San Giovanni
Month	Jan	Feb	Mar	Apr	May	Jun	Jul	Aug	Sep	Oct	Nov	Dec	Year
Mean daily maximum °C (°F)	13.4 (56.1)	13.8 (56.8)	15.6 (60.1)	18.1 (64.6)	22.0 (71.6)	25.8 (78.4)	28.4 (83.1)	29.0 (84.2)	26.4 (79.5)	22.2 (72.0)	18.3 (64.9)	15.2 (59.4)	20.7 (69.2)
Mean daily minimum °C (°F)	7.6 (45.7)	7.3 (45.1)	8.5 (47.3)	10.6 (51.1)	13.7 (56.7)	17.8 (64.0)	20.5 (68.9)	20.8 (69.4)	18.4 (65.1)	14.8 (58.6)	11.8 (53.2)	9.1 (48.4)	13.4 (56.1)
Average precipitation mm (inches)	116 (4.6)	73 (2.9)	100 (3.9)	63 (2.5)	54 (2.1)	21 (0.8)	13 (0.5)	20 (0.8)	61 (2.4)	75 (3.0)	137 (5.4)	171 (6.7)	904 (35.6)
Average precipitation days	11.0	8.0	11.0	7.0	4.0	2.0	1.0	2.0	4.0	7.0	9.0	12.0	78.0
Source: "Comuni-Italiani.it - Amantea". 2009-07-22.

== Economy and transportation ==
Economy is based on agriculture and tourism. Since the 1950s, the cultivation of the Red onion of Tropea has greatly developed, and it is nowadays appreciated both in domestic and foreign markets. During the last 20 years, the export of this product, along with other commercial activities, has propelled the local economy.

The village is also a seaside resort; its port was built in 2003 and provides easy access to the Lipari Islands, being a key element in its tourism infrastructure.

Transportation is enhanced by the favourable position of the village, being situated near the highway SS18. It can also be reached from other parts of Italy by a railway line, and by the A2 motorway, which connects the village with the Lamezia Terme International Airport, just 25 km (15.53 mi) away.

== Main sights and events ==
A large tower, which dates from the 14th century, is the only notable building. The upper part of the tower is decorated with corbels. This tower is nicknamed U Turriune in the local dialect.

Saint Francis of Paola is the local patron saint, and his feast is celebrated from 1 to 3 September. During the celebrations, which attract numerous pilgrims from the nearby villages, there is a procession where the statue of the saint is carried on the shoulders along the streets (sometimes accompanied by a cart decorated with flowers and ex-voto).

== Hamlets ==
The territory of Campora San Giovanni is divided into the following hamlets:

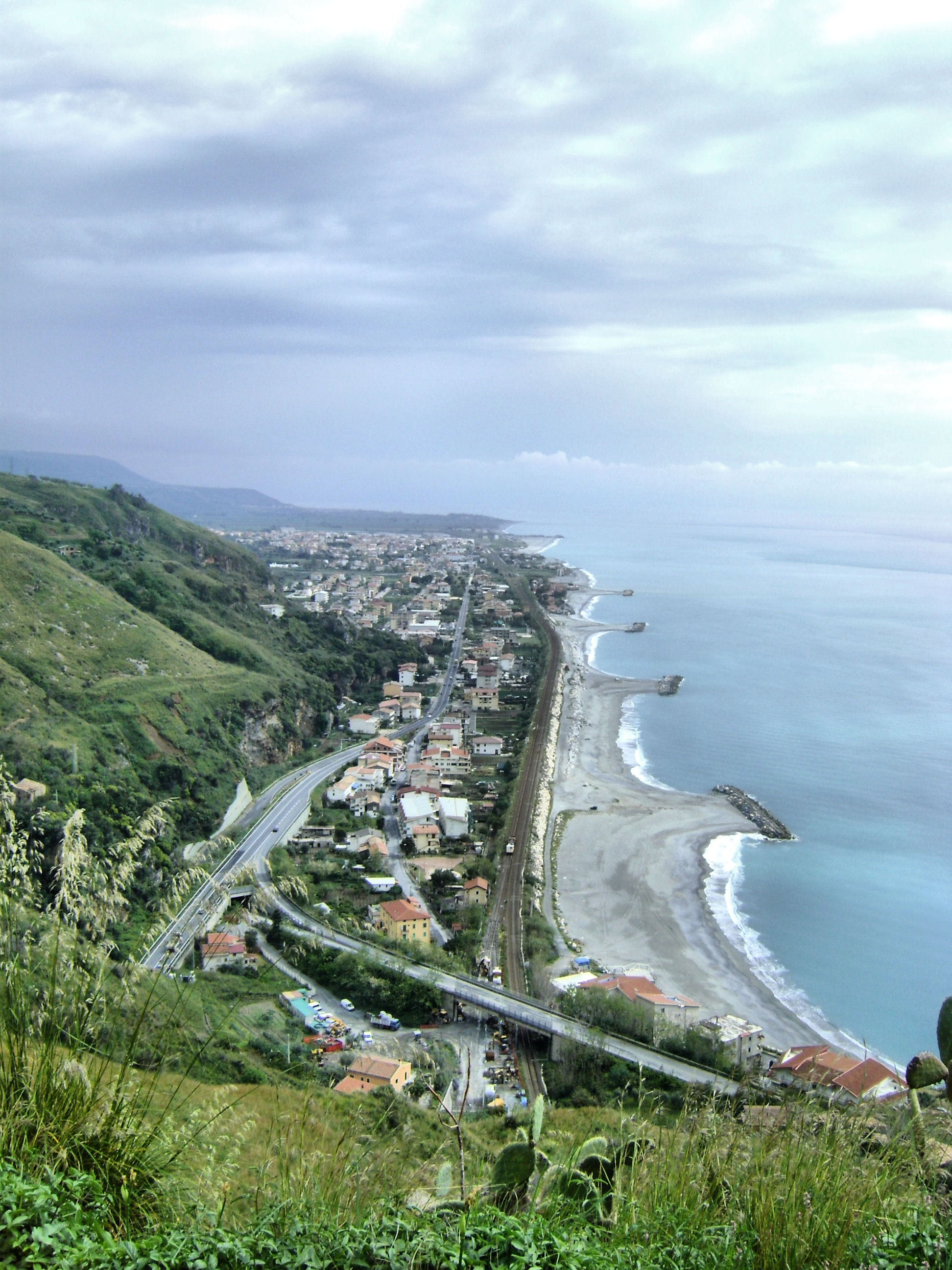
Panorama of Campora San Giovanni from hamlet Strìttùrì.

- Augurato
- Carratelli
- Cologni
- Cozza
- Cuccuvaglia
- Fravitte
- Gallo (southern part)
- Imbelli
- Marano
- Marinella
- Mirabelli
- Oliva
- Piana Cavallo
- Piana Mauri
- Principessa
- Ribes
- Rubano
- Strìttùrì
- Villanova

== History ==
=== Ancient history ===
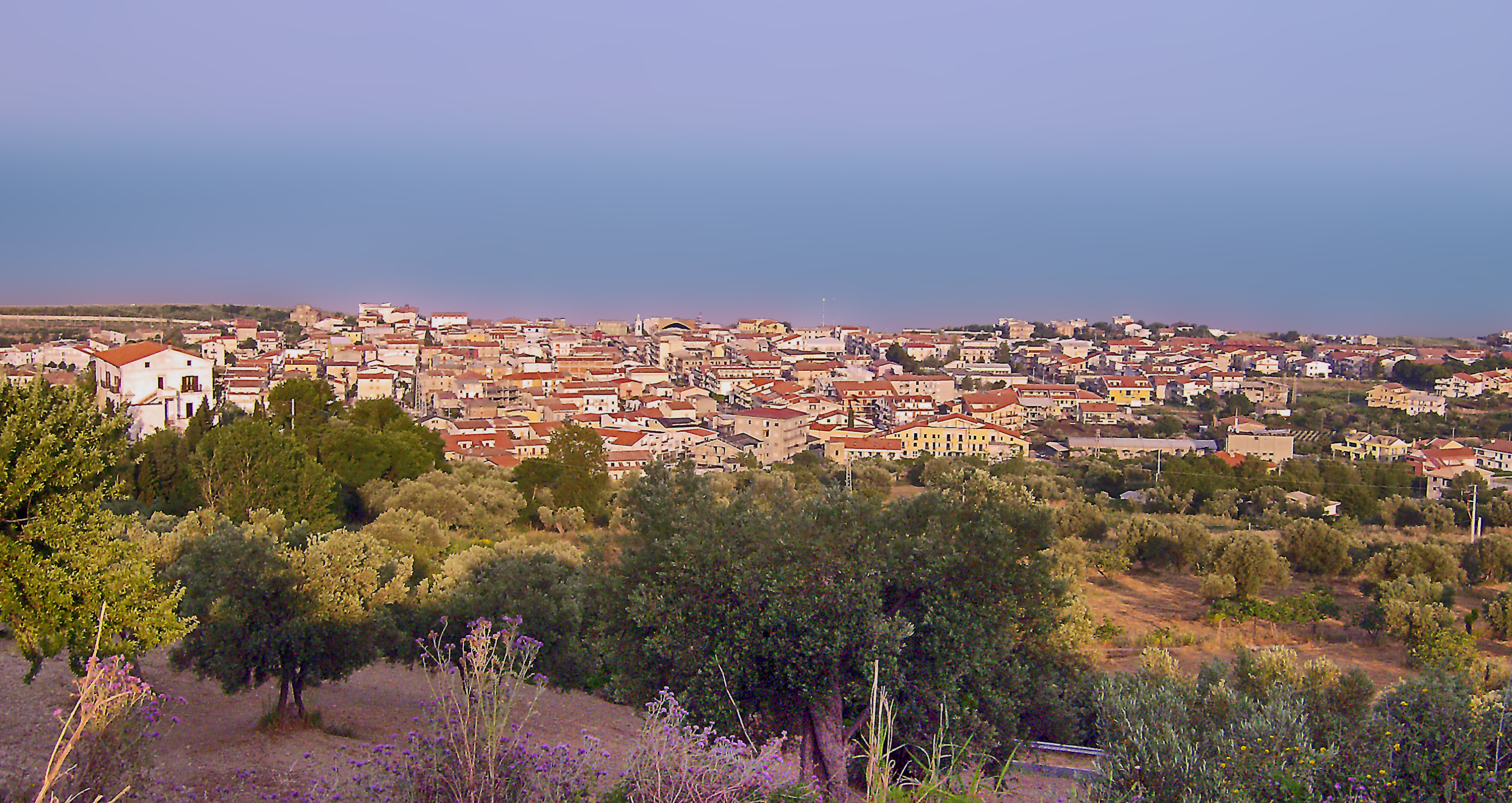
Panorama of Campora San Giovanni, at dawn, seen from the hamlet Mirabelli.

In ancient times, the area was the headquarters of two cities of Magna Graecia:

- Temesa (ancient city), an ally of Sibari; it corresponds more or less with the current neighbourhoods of Carratelli and Imbelli; from Imbelli, to the edge of Serra d'Aiello, remains of ancient Greek constructions have been found;
- Farther away, the city of Klethe, in the vicinity of the current Principessa to the edge of Savuto of Cleto, which was allegedly inhabited by a princess from whom derives the name of the neighbourhood, Amazonia, an ally of the Crotonianos, hostile because of the Sibaritides.

The two rival cities were also victims of piratical incursions, being eventually destroyed; their population escaped to the mountain crags. The territory has always been subject to colonization and conquest throughout the course of the centuries: Phoenicians, Greeks, Romans, Barbarians, Arabs, Byzantines, and Normans occupied this area in different periods of time.

=== Middle Ages ===
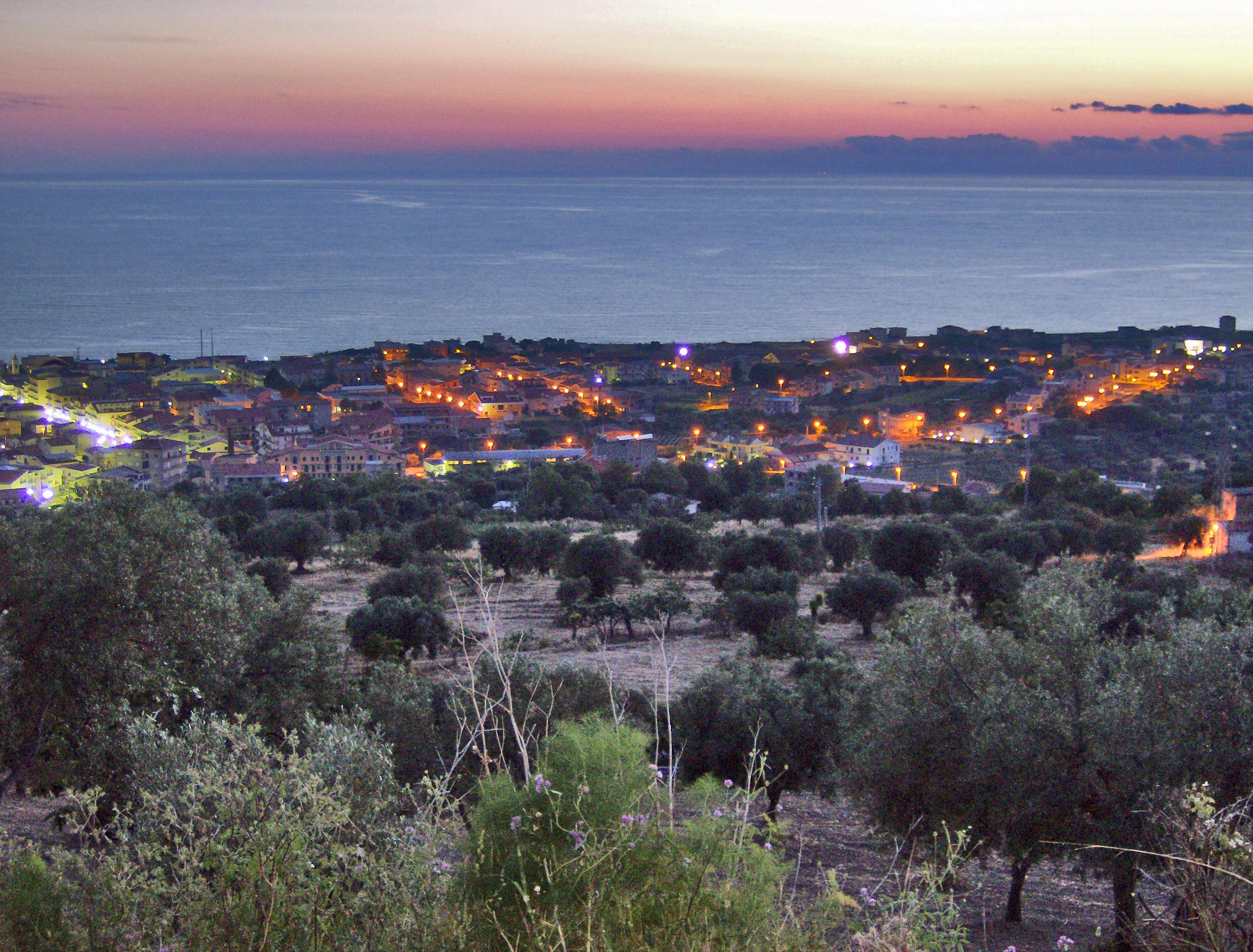
Summer panorama of Campora San Giovanni, at sunset, from the hamlet Mirabelli, with local flora nearby.

There are few historical documents from the Middle Ages of this area. It was the central landing point for the emir Mohammad Abdul al-Zimzim, who proceeded from there to invade Amantea (at the time known as Clampetia). The Arab occupation was short, enduring until the arrival of the Byzantines, who were themselves later replaced by the Normans. During the Norman era, the first fortifications and towers were built: one being constructed near Coreca; the other is known locally as "U Turriune" and is close to the town of Fravitte, not far from the civic centre. With the successive arrival of the Anjous and the Aragonese, and thereafter under the Kingdom of Naples, the territory declined in importance compared to the nearby Amantea and other adjacent areas. The region is also considered a lost outpost of Hebrew culture dating to 1492 — the year the Jews were expelled from Castile and Aragon by Ferdinand the Catholic.

=== Modern history ===
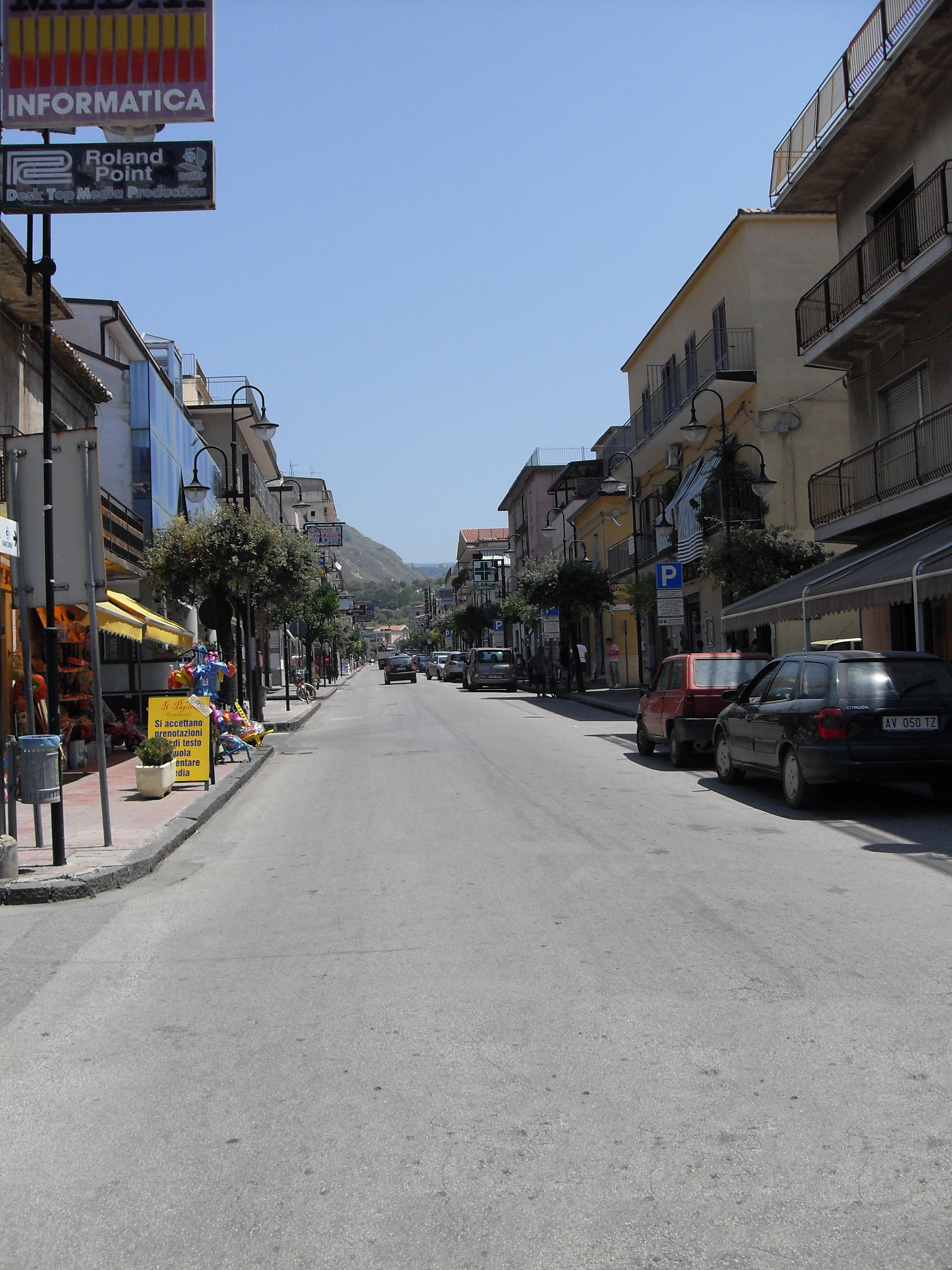
A view of Corso Italia street, the fulcrum of the village.

Following a period of historical obscurity, a revaluation of the territory was begun in the 17th century, thanks to noble landowners in a large part of Amantea, with origins in several areas ruled by the Crown of Naples. Most current neighbourhoods still bear the names of these old landowners. In the 1730s, a nobleman of Sicilian ancestry, the Marquis Francesco María Cozza - a relative of the painter with the same name- had a silk factory built, in the neighbourhood that still bears his name - thus adding cultivation of silkworms to the town's industries. He also ordered the building of a chapel dedicated to Saint John the Baptist (in old dialect Santu Janni). The silk factory also had its headquarters in the Masonry, and in the neighbouring Augurato for a brief period of time. There remain traces of architecture from the 18th century, thanks to local sculptor Vincenzo Torchia, of Nocera Terinese. In 1756, the silk factory ended its activity without any known explanation, and the area relapsed into obscurity for 130 years.

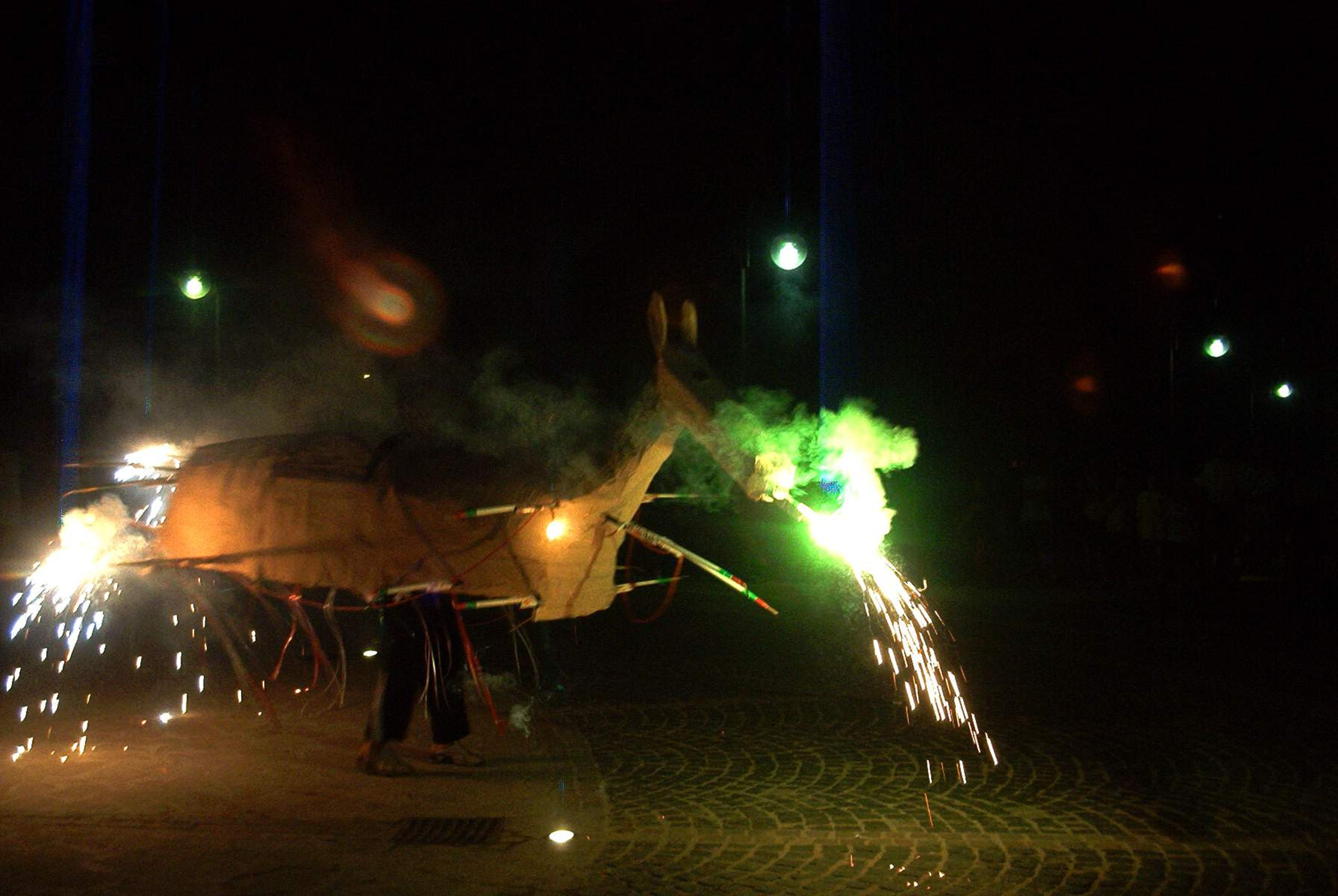
"U Ballo de U Ciucciu de San Giuvanni" (The Dance of the Saint John the Baptist's Donkey)

=== Present day ===
The core of present-day Campora was divided until 1876 among the current city councils of Amantea, Aiello Calabro and Nocera Terinese. In 1877 began the first migrations from adjacent counties: Cleto, Nocera Terinese, Aiello Calabro, Belmonte Calabro, Lago, Longobardi, San Mango d'Aquino. Immigrants from Bavaria also arrived from the Austro-Hungarian Empire - among them, a few merchants or noblemen who had fallen into misfortune. One of these was Baron Johann-Paschalis von Tief (who Italianised his name to Pasquale Chieffa I in 1858), an aristocrat of Tyrolese origin who tried to recover the wealth lost by his ancestors. Working in viticulture in the area of the Savuto, he was able to make his fortune and to form the first nucleus of Campora San Giovanni, thanks also to the help of the two main landowners at the time: the marquises Cavallo and Mauri.

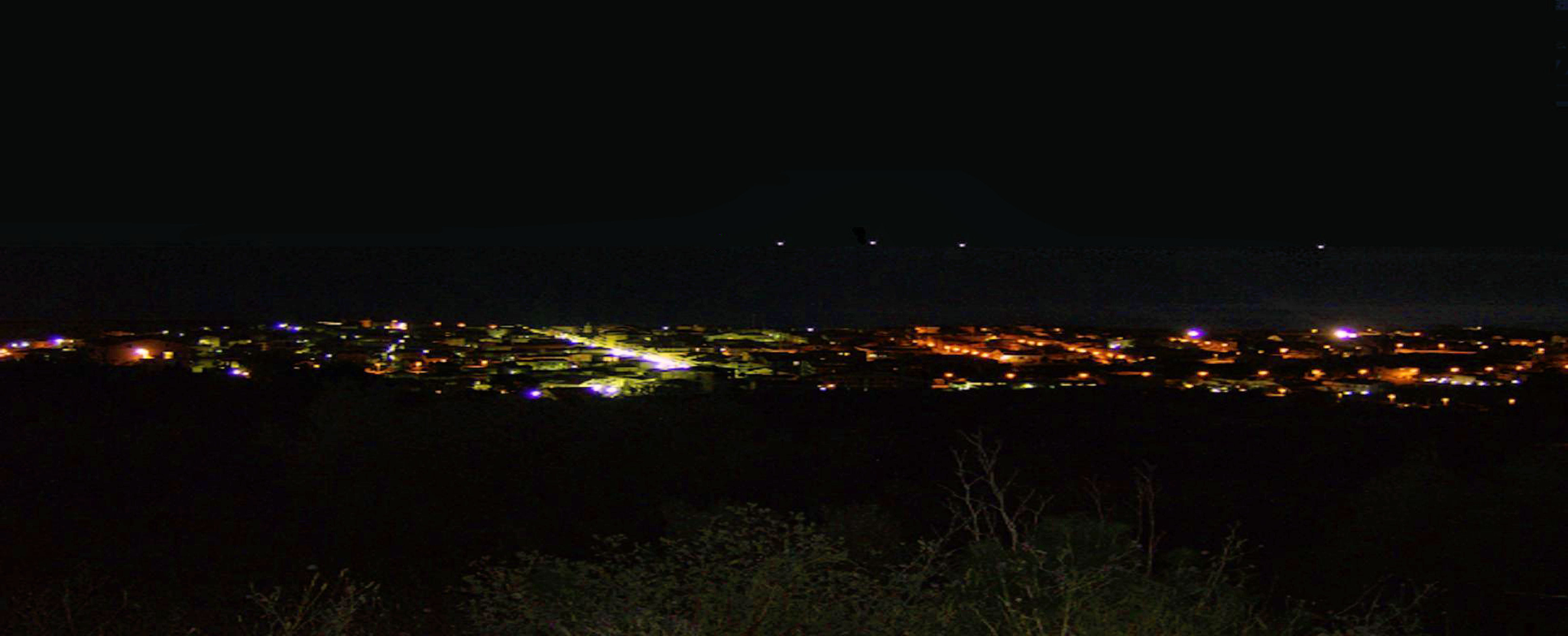
Panorama summer nocturne of Campora San Giovanni, from the neighborhood of Mirabelli, of fishing in the night for anchovies.

Over the following twenty years, new migratory waves from the interior came to the coast. In 1898, Amantea acquired the territory of Campora San Giovanni from its neighbours. The population participated actively in the First World War, and in the years of the Fascist regime, the territory had new reparations.

By the time of the Second World War, many Camporeses left again to serve their homeland in the military. In 1943, the country was bombarded by the Allied forces; there are ruins of this bombardment in the Augurato neighbourhood. During their retreat, the Nazis murdered 50 Camporeses accused of treason, in order to show what fate might be expected by traitors. The town of Campora had a single partisano: Angelo Vadacchino, who fought in Florence and was confined to Prato, after feigning idiocy.

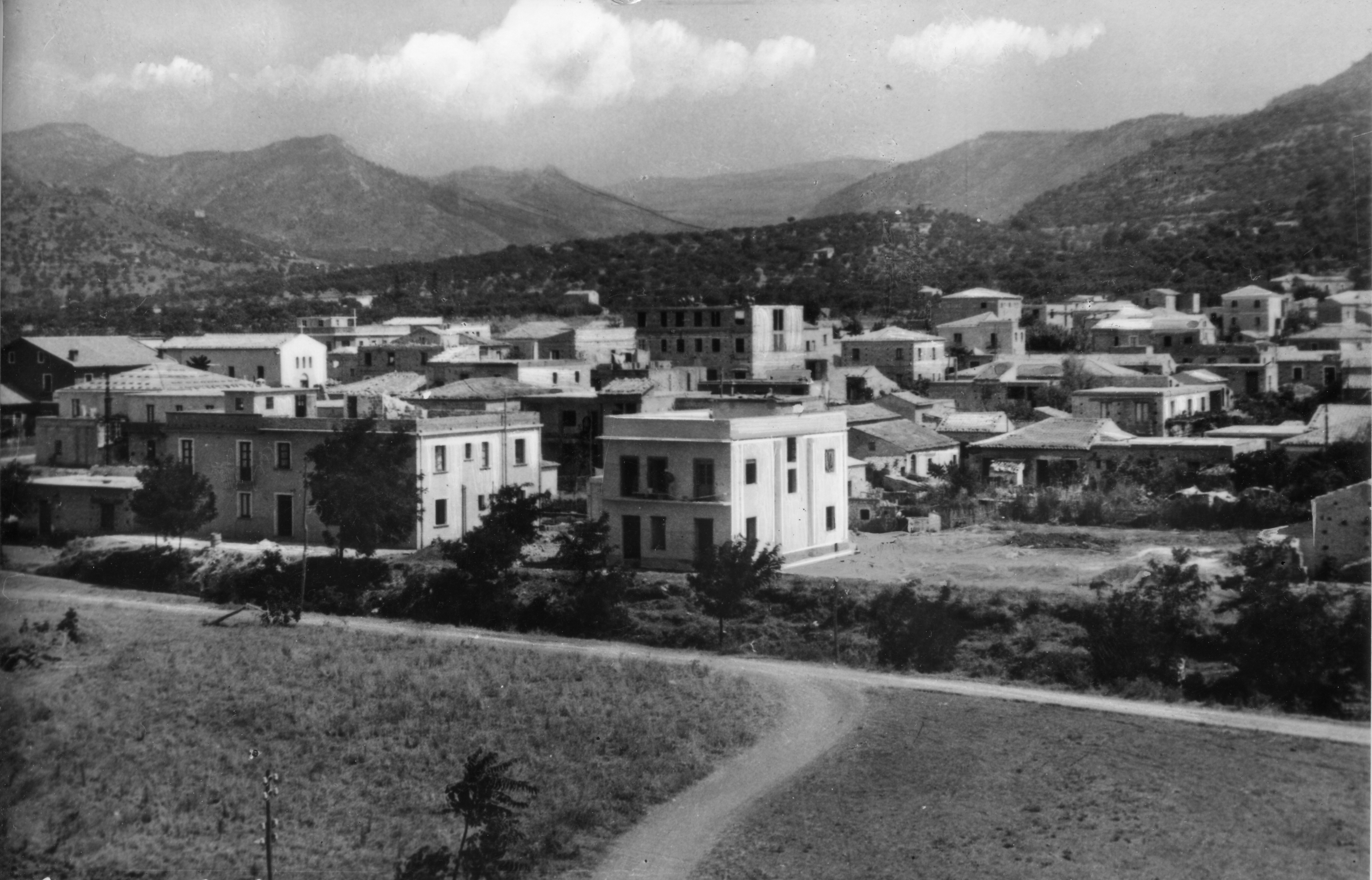
Panorama of Campora San Giovanni in a photo from the 1960s, from the bay aerial view of Campora San Giovanni

As in all southern Italian locales in the 1950s and 1980s, many camporeses emigrated in search of work to Northern Italy, Venezuela and New Zealand; it is believed that approximately 7,000 people departed in fewer than 30 years.

During the 1980s, there began an economic explosion of Campora San Giovanni that continued for an almost five-year period, with the development of hotel and marine structures, and the explosion of the red onion in several agricultural cooperatives. With the fall of the Wall of Berlin came the arrival of new migratory waves from Eastern Europe, with labourers coming for agriculture (women) and for the building sector (men). There is now an influx of small Chinese communities, Arabic-magrebines and Indians.

=== Local culture ===
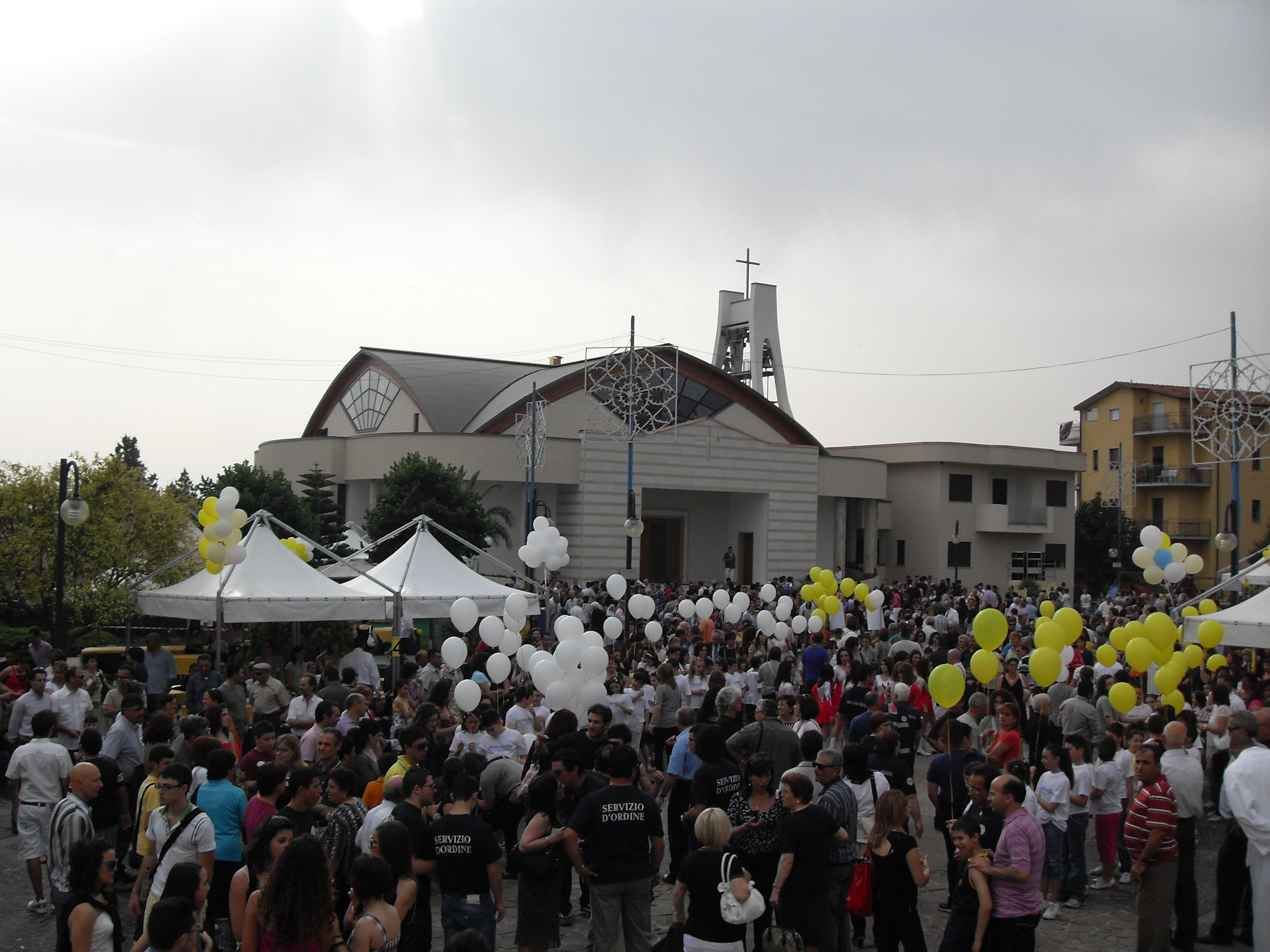
the New Church of Saint Peter Apostle, Inaugurated on June 12, 2010

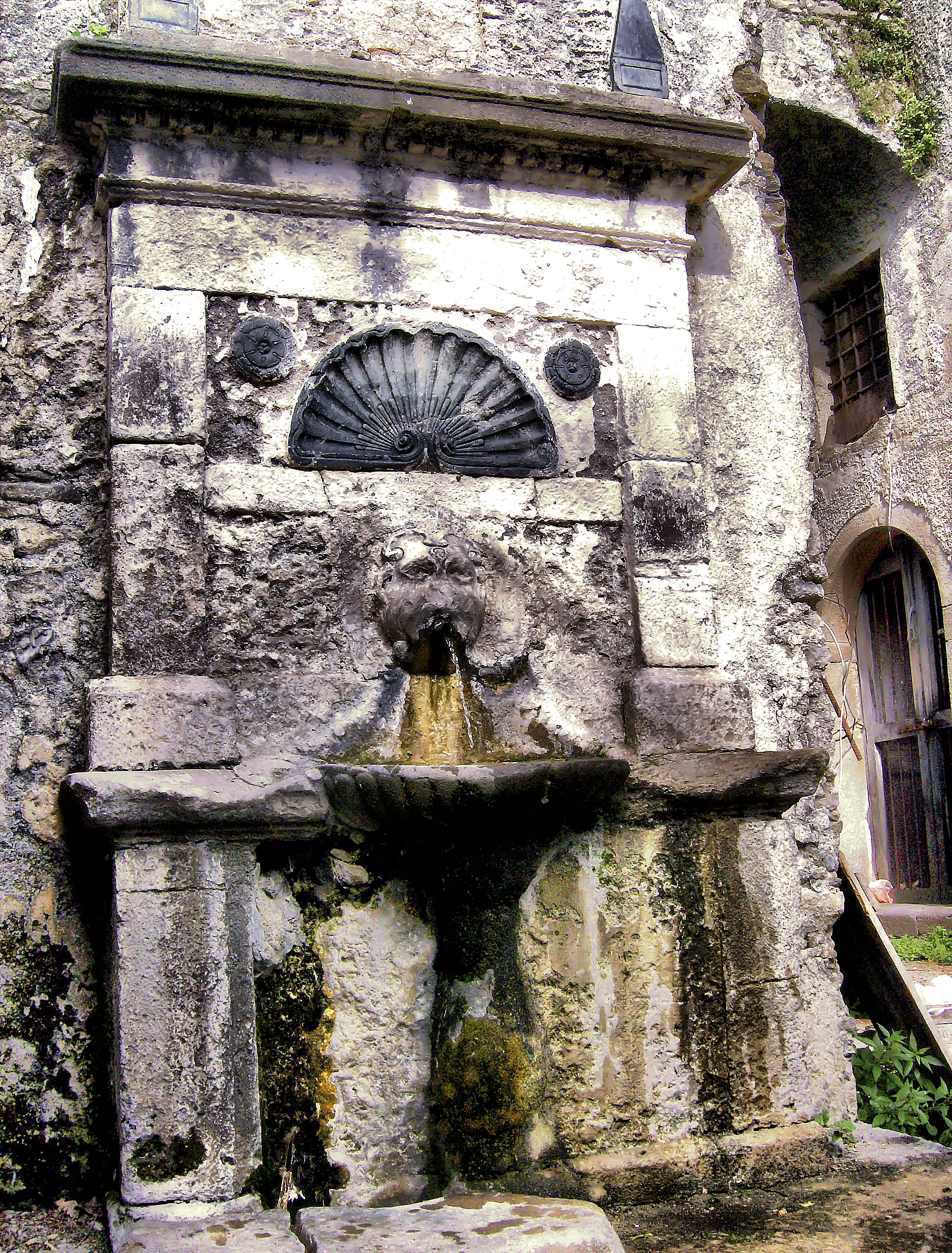
The Funtana du Peshcaru (Source of the Puppet) in Augurato

The name "Campora San Giovanni" is derived from the Latin campora (field, camp), while San Giovanni refers to Saint John the Baptist, protector of the neighbouring Nocera Terinese, and also for the name of the old Chapel of Santu Janni, "Saint John" in the old dialect. Several of the neighbourhood names also have their origin in those of the old proprietors:

- Augurato: from the Latin "Auguratio Esperantia".
- Carratelli: From the family of the same name, originally derived from Latin "Carae Tellus" (beloved to Tellus, a pagan god of fertility, protector of the dead, and god of earthquakes).
- Cologni: from Colunus (colonist).
- Cozza: settlement founded by the Marquis Francesco María Cozza.
- Cuccuvaglia: Latin Cum valicum ("With the Valleys").
- Fravitte: to friable land.
- Gallo: 'Chicken', an old centre for chicken and other livestock breeding.
- Imbelli: from Latin "In Bellum" (In the War), centre of a war between Temesa and Klethe.
- Marano: from the family of Cosenza, a.k.a. Marano.
- Marinella: "the Small Marina" (one is nearby.)
- Mirabelli: from the noble family; also means 'Beautiful View'.
- Olive: from the nearby Olive groves.
- Piana Cavallo: Headquarters of the possessions of the family of Marquis Luigi I Cavallo.
- Piana Mauri: Headquarters of the possessions of the family of Marquis Alberto I Mauri.
- Principessa: was considered the headquarters of the Princess of Amazonia.
- Ribes: in reference to strong currant stains.
- Rubano: named after a stream, also for the continuous forays of the highwaymen of the past.
- Villanova: from Latin "Villa Novam" that is "New City", to the borders of Serra d'Aiello.

== Places of interest ==
A tower of remarkable dimensions, dated to the 14th century, is the only construction of historical value. The upper part of the tower is adorned with crowning ledges. The tower is called in the local dialect "U Turriune". There is also the Church of Santa Filomena in Augurato, with the associated "Funtana du Peshcaru".

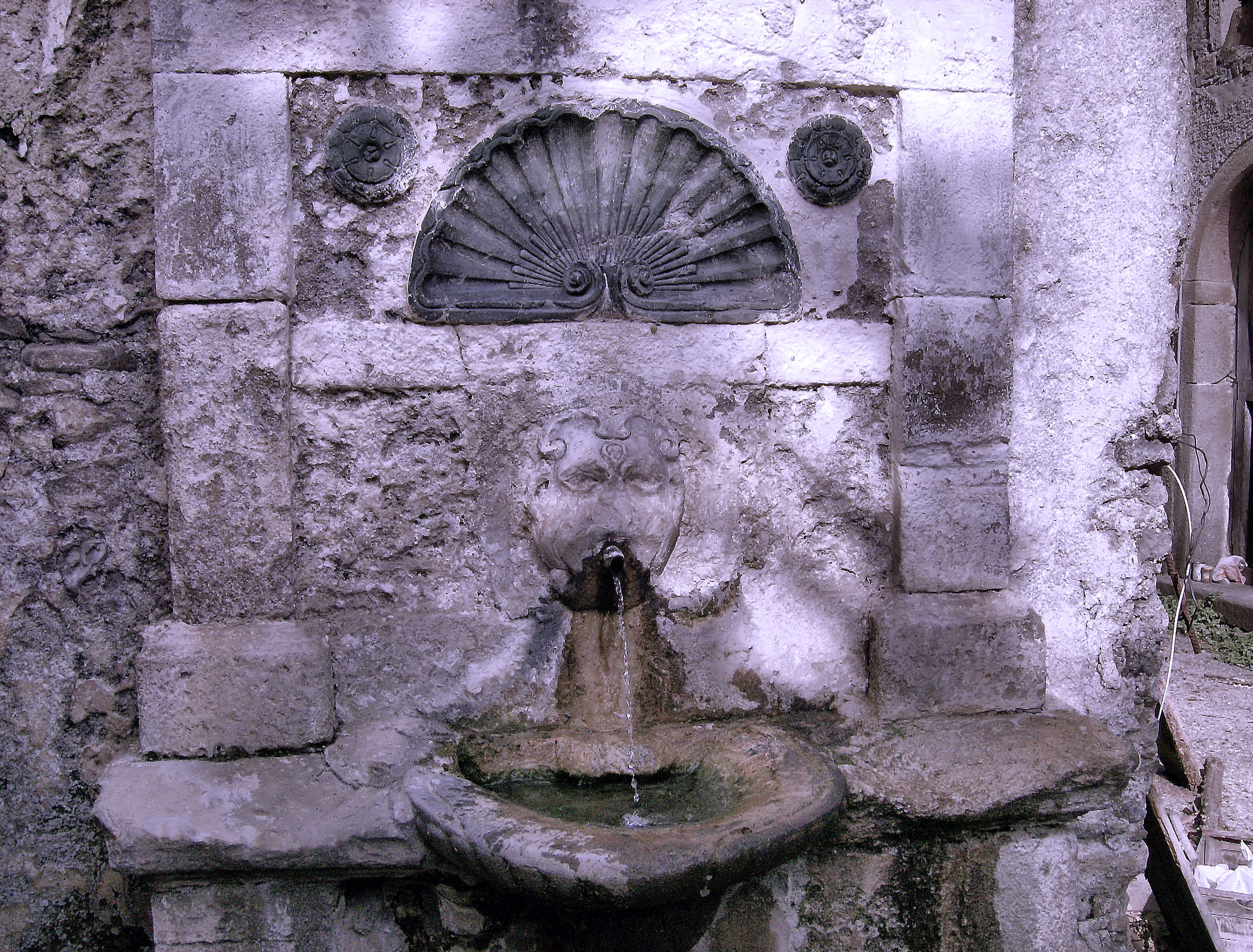
Funtana du Peshcaru (Fountain of the Puppet) to Augurato.

Of more recent construction is the port (2002) and the square "San Francesco of Paola" (2003), dedicated to the patron saint of that name, whose feast is celebrated between September 1 and 3. In this feast's procession, people carry the saint's statue along the streets on their shoulders, or sometimes in a cart adorned with flowers.

The main church (1956) is dedicated to San Pietro Apostolo (St. Peter). The Curia decided to build a new church because of the population increase. On June 12, 2010 in the presence of the Archbishop of Cosenza-Bisignano, Msgr. Salvatore Nunnari, and other local authorities was finally inaugurated the new church of San Pietro Apostolo.

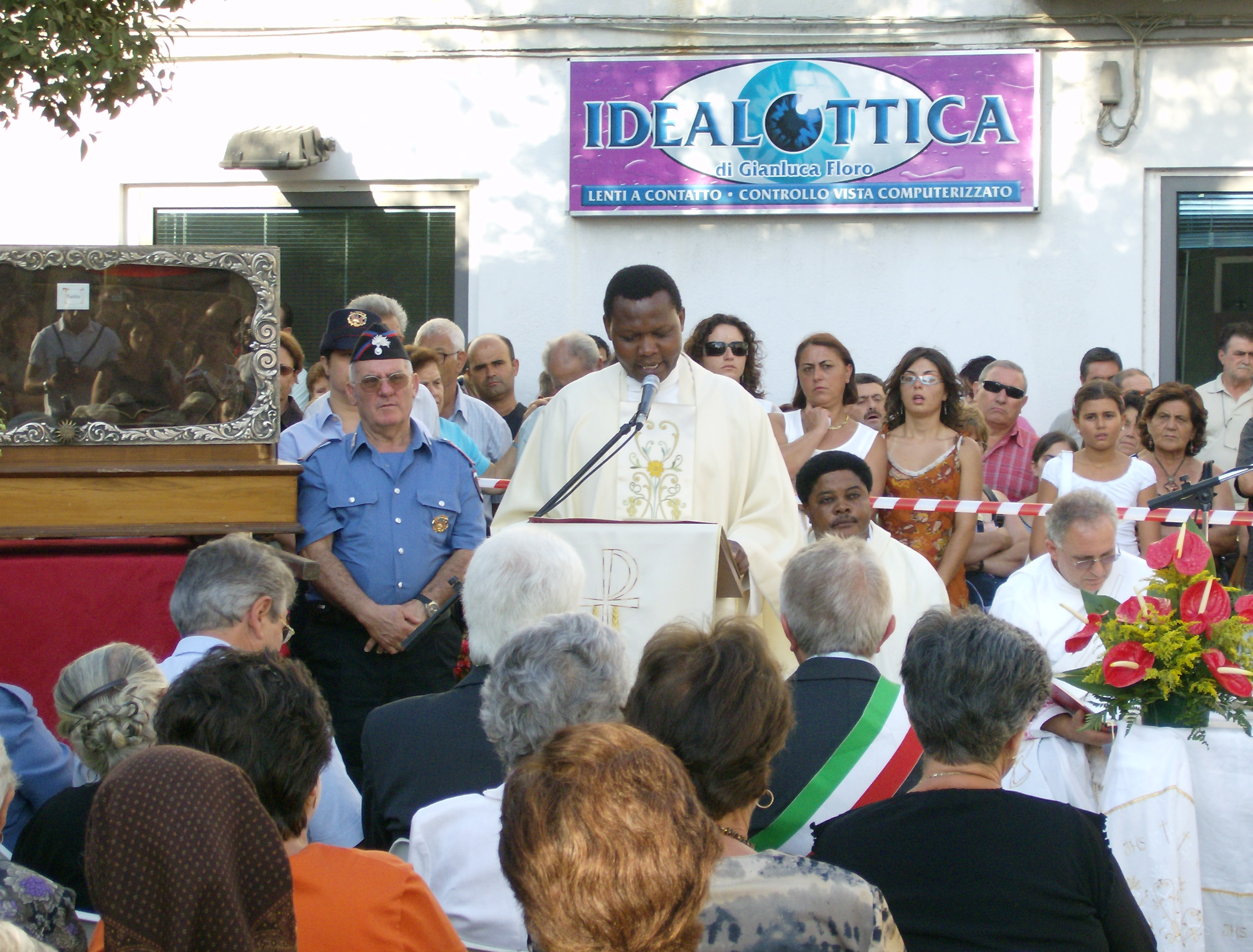
Don Apollinaris Mashughuli during the celebration on September 3, 2007, for the 500th anniversary of the death of San Francis of Paula.

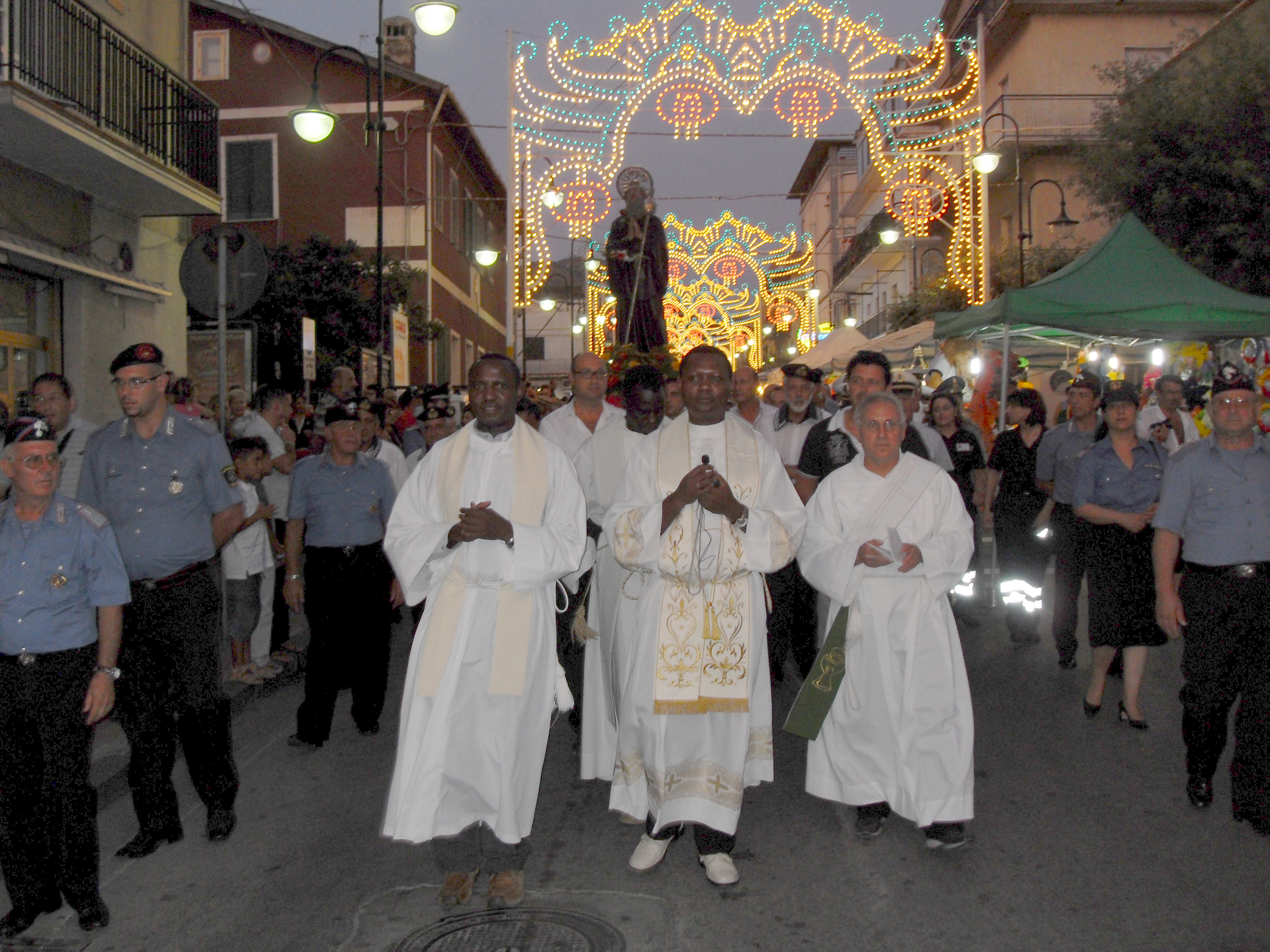
The Procession of St. Francis of Paola on September 3, 2009.

=== Dialect ===
The local dialect is among the offshoots of the Calabrian dialects. Being subjected to hybridism with other dialects, this dialect has lost its originality over the course of time, with other words added by newer immigrants.

=== Folklore ===
As with all parts of Calabria, folklore is present in the tradition of the region, from the tarantellas in major celebrations to the smallest parties and the Cuntaturi, in which bards would tell stories of rural life. It is today a widespread tradition that the Cuntaturi is chosen by the local elder from among the sharpest and most vivacious children.

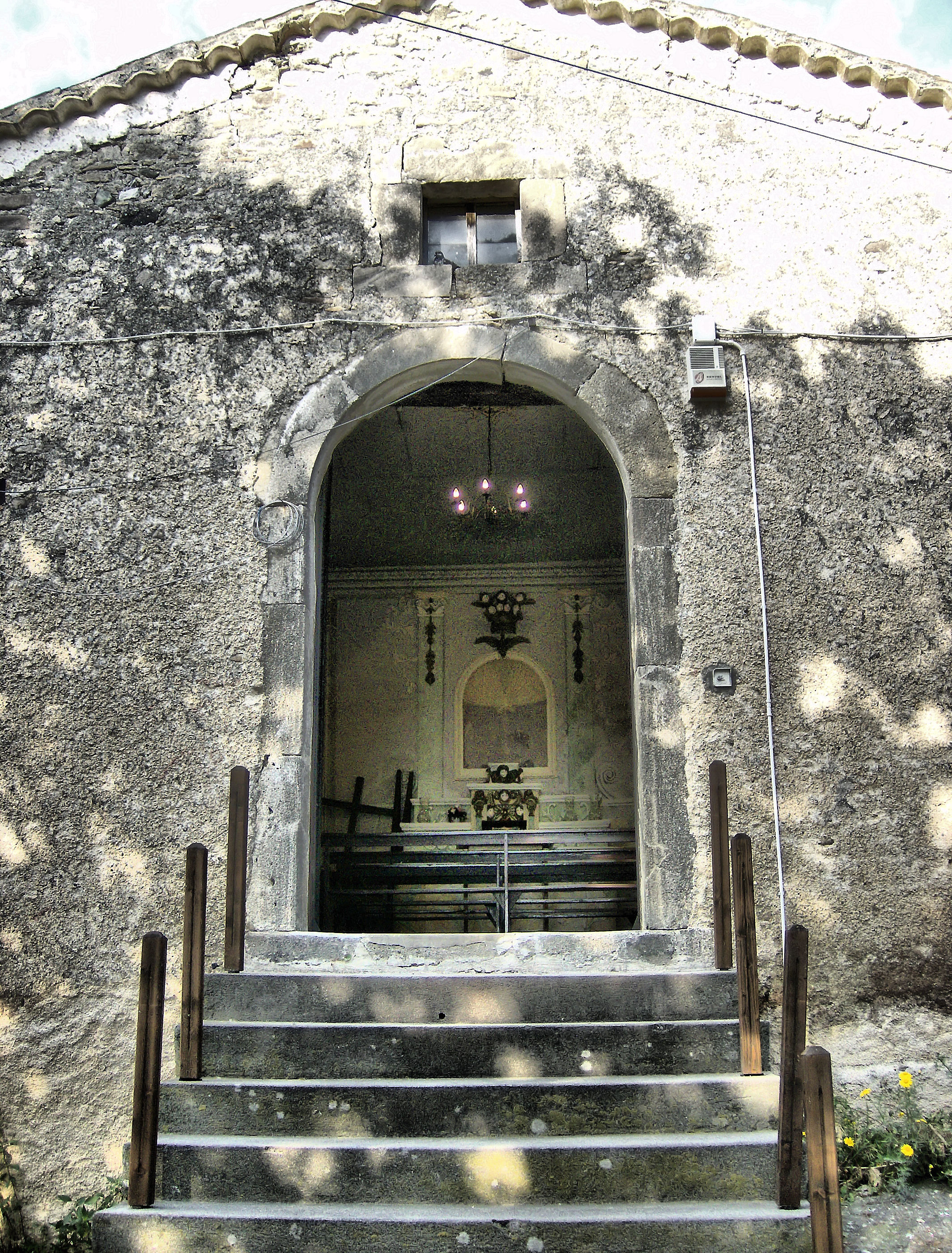
The Church of Santa Filomena to Augurato

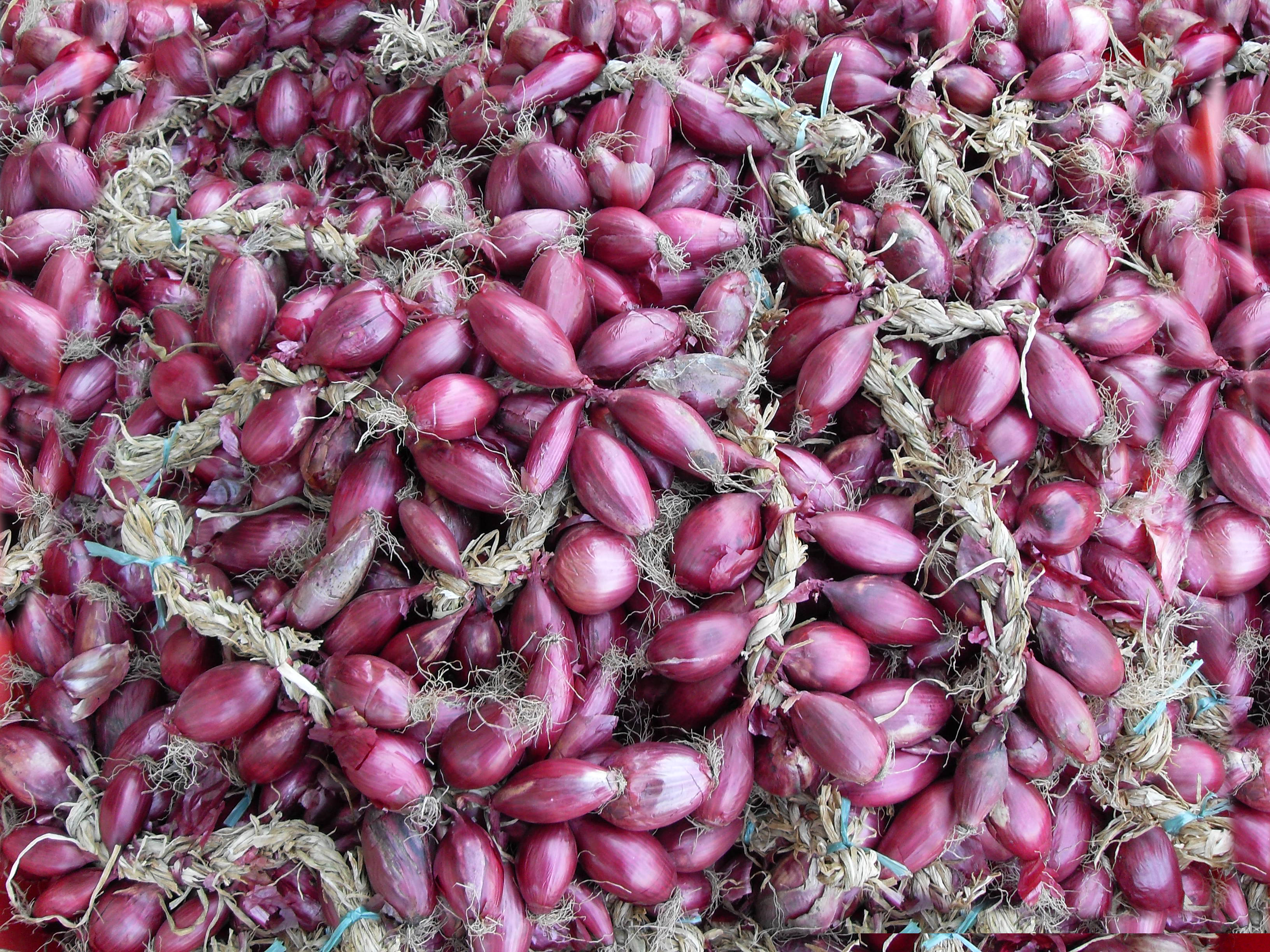
The Red Onion: the Big Swan Neck.

== Local cuisine ==
The local cuisine, typical of Calabria, reflects the agricultural and fishing industries. It is represented by simple dishes, complex pastries, and pork sausages. Typical dishes include:

=== Peasants' cuisine ===
- Coria (or Frittule) 'ccu fasuli e cipulle: pork skin with beans and red onions.
- Frittata i Carunevale: on Mardi Gras, every local family prepares a spaghetti omelette with fresh ricotta cheese and sausages, as on the following day (Ash Wednesday) Lent, meat should be avoided.

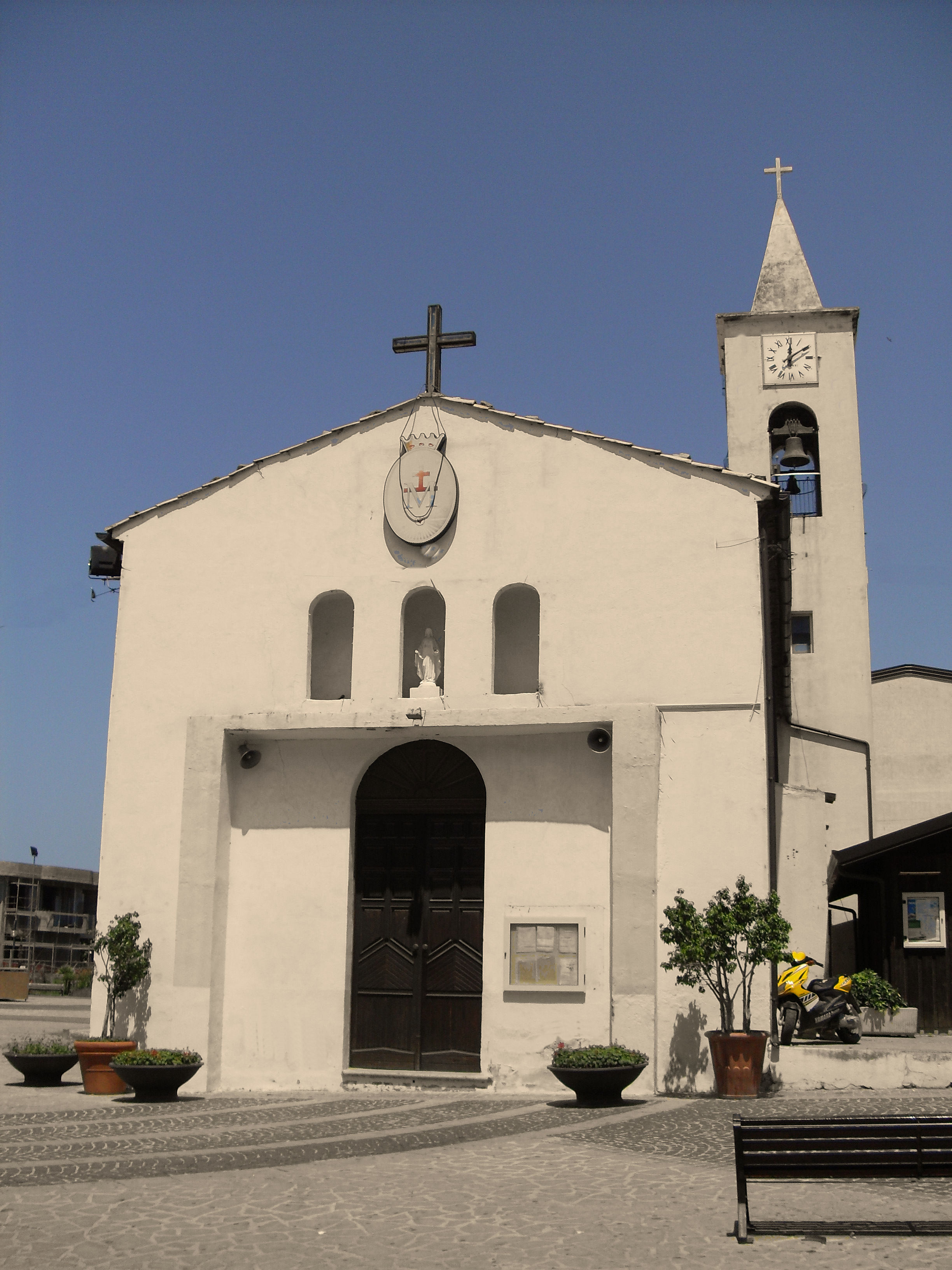
Church of San Pietro Apostolo, in a summer photo.

- Patate 'ccu pipe e mulinciane: chips fried with peppers and aubergines, sometimes including pork skin or pork cubes.
- Minestra e fasuli: aromatic herbs, boiled or shallow fried, with beans, and sometimes chili peppers.
- Mulinciane e pummaduari: Aubergines in oil with fresh tomatoes (a refreshing dish eaten in the summer).
- Spezzatinu (Stew): pork stew with roast potatoes and tomato sauce, typical of the patron's feast.
- Pitticelle, flour flat cakes, sometimes with pumpkin flowers, courgettes, or olives.

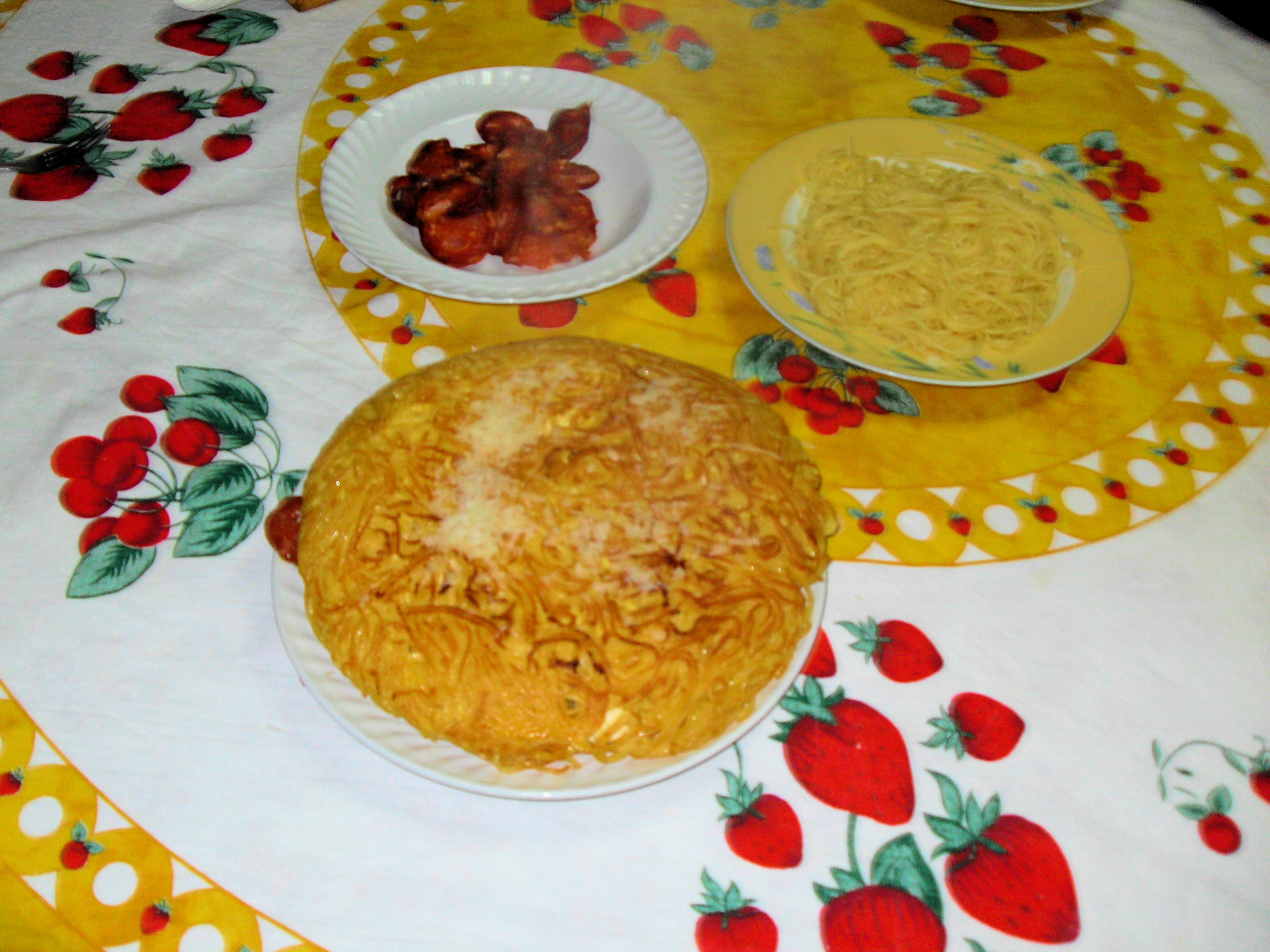
the Frittata i Carunevale

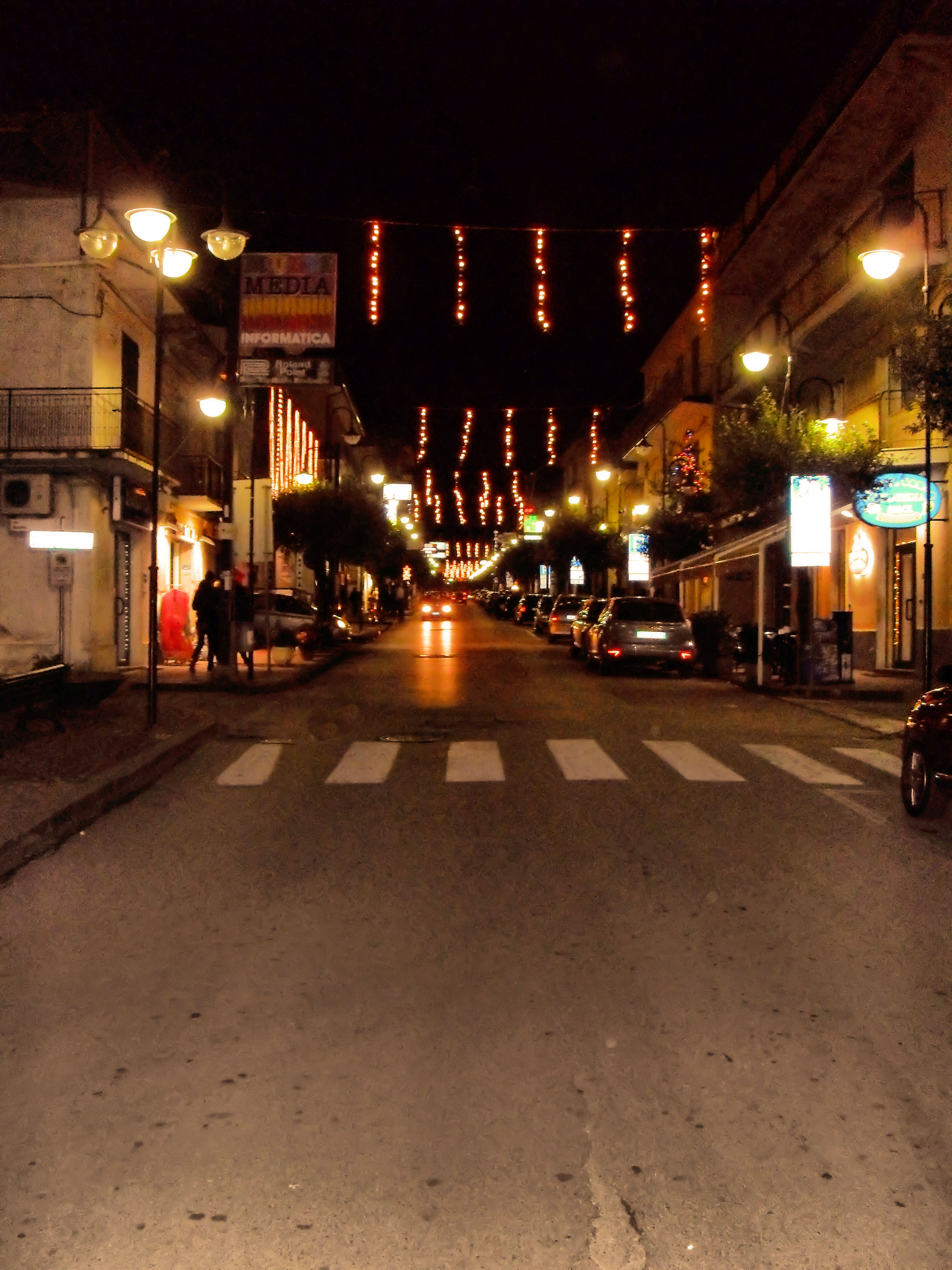
Corso Italia street in a Christmas photo, in 2009.

=== Seafood ===
- Pasta 'mbiancu e baccalà: pasta with baccalà boiled and dressed with olive oil, typical of the holy celebrations when meat is banned, such as Advent, Christmas, Ash Wednesday or Pentecost.
- Baccalà e patate vullute: baccalà boiled in tomato sauce, with large cubed potatoes.
- Alici fritte: small anchovies fried in oil and dressed with lemon or oranges.
- Alici sutt'uaglio: anchovies in oil, eaten with bread, oregano and sun-dried tomatoes.
- Alici 'mpipate: anchovies in peppers and chili sauce, eaten with bread.

=== Cakes ===
- Cuzzupa: typical Easter cake, usually with an egg in the middle.
- Bucchinotti o Buccunotti: a typical Calabrese cake, with grape jam or cocoa and raisins.
- Pani i castagna: similar to castagnaccio, but smaller and thicker, with pine nuts, raisins, walnuts and hazelnuts.
- Turdilli: fried, typical of Christmas time, with a spiral shape and immersed in honey.

=== Wine ===
Notable local wines cultivated in the region include the tintos, as a basis of the camporese food. The most appreciated varieties are 'Savuto' and 'Gallo'.

== Famous and notable Camporeses ==
- Angelo Vadacchino, partisan, peasant and political activist, called by the camporeses "Mastr'Angelo", (1890–1976).
- Fabrizio Filippo, Canadian-American actor and screenwriter.
- Fabián Mazzei, Argentinean Spanish actor and screenwriter, know also as Horatio in television "Un Paso Adelante", the parents were Hamlet Marinella'.
- Mario Esposito 'Expo' International Artist & Sculptor lived out his years in Campora San Giovanni, he rests in the local cemetery (1935-2012)

== See also ==
- Coreca
