= Coreca Caves =

Two caves in Italy

Coreca Caves are two karstic cavities (Grotta du 'Scuru, cb404, and Gruttuni, cb405) located along the Tyrrhenian coast of Calabria, near Coreca in the municipality of Amantea.

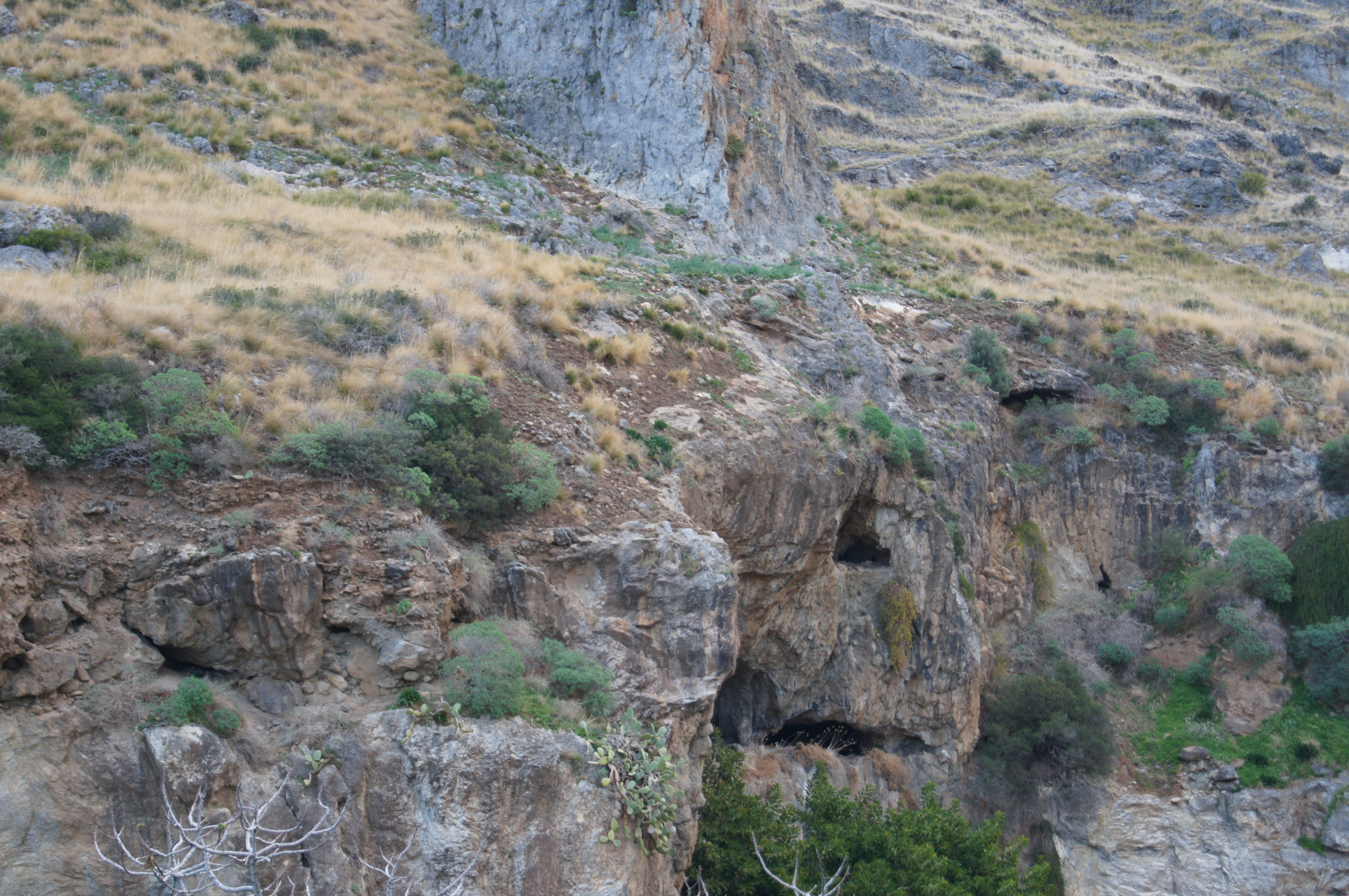
Grotta du' Scuru

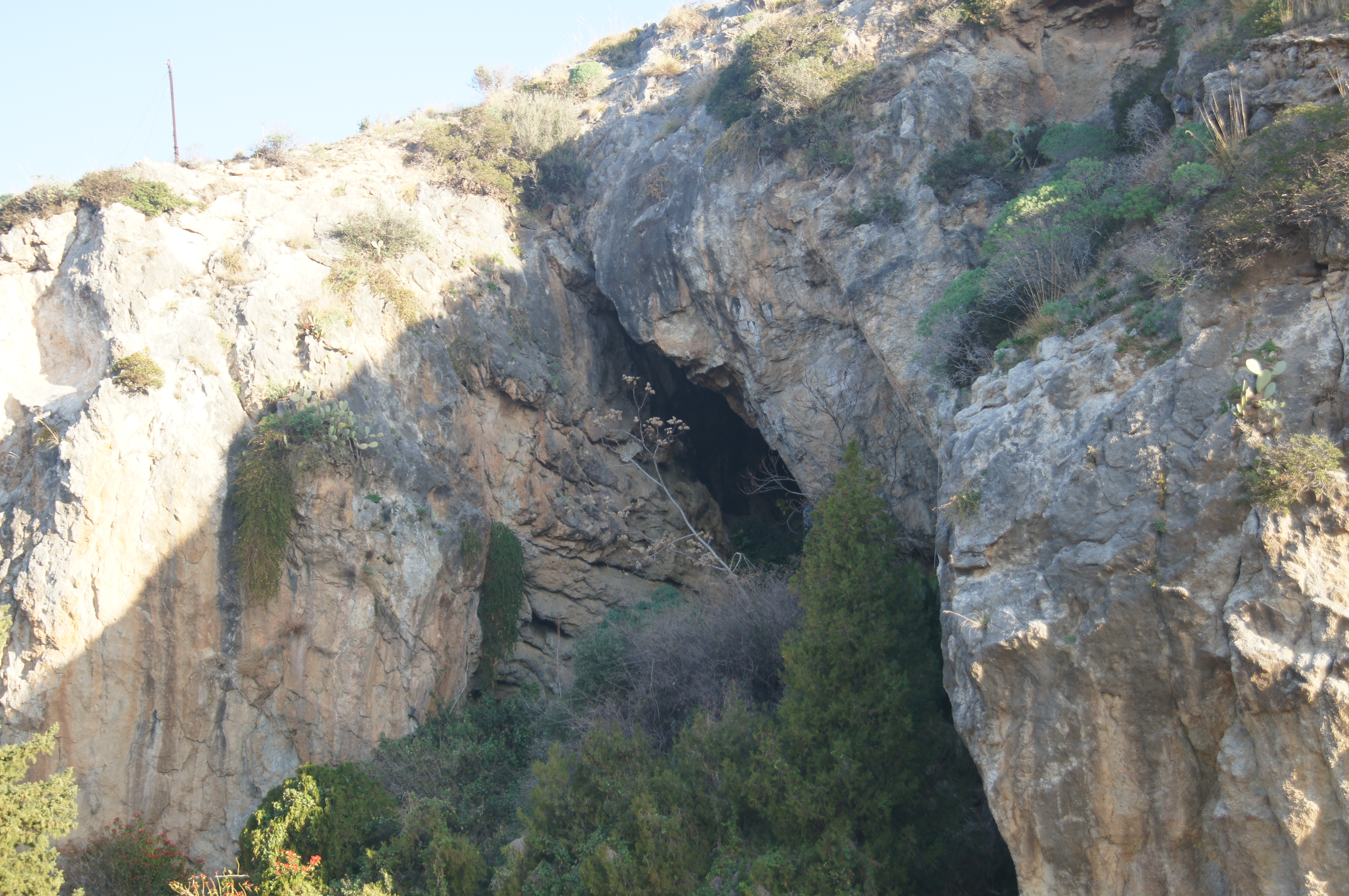
Grotta du Pecuraru

The two entrances are very close, about ten yards from each other. Formerly they were at sea level, while today they are about 25m higher, placed on a rock wall and therefore difficult to access. They differ by the width of the entrance, which is wide in the Gruttuni and narrow in the Grutta du 'Scuru, with the consequence that the former is a relatively light cave and the second very dark.

The two adjacent caves are important from an archaeological point of view. In 2012, it was proven (confirming earlier Piedmontese scholars) that they were used during the late Bronze Age (as well as in later periods). The artifacts found (terracotta, stone mills, polished pebbles, etc.) were quite well preserved due to the difficulty of accessing the caves themselves, indicating a different use of the two cavities: the Gruttuni were used for housing purposes, while the Scuru was used for funeral rites.
