= Serra d'Aiello =

- Comune
- Comune di Serra d'Aiello
- Location within Italy Location within Calabria
- Coordinates: 39°5′N 16°8′E
- Country: Italy
- Region: Calabria
- Province: Cosenza (CS)

Government
  - Mayor: Antonio Cuglietta

Area
  - Total: 4.51 km^{2} (1.74 sq mi)
- Elevation: 373 m (1,224 ft)

Population (2007)
  - Total: 768
  - Density: 170/km^{2} (441/sq mi)
- Demonym: Serresi
- Time zone: UTC+1 (CET)
  - Summer (DST): UTC+2 (CEST)
- Postal code: 87030
- Dialing code: 0982
- ISTAT code: 078140
- Patron saint: St. Martin of Tours
- Saint day: 11 November

Serra d'Aiello (Arbëreshë Albanian: Serrë) is a town and comune of Arbëreshë origin in the province of Cosenza in the Calabria region of southern Italy.
