= Coreca =

- Frazione
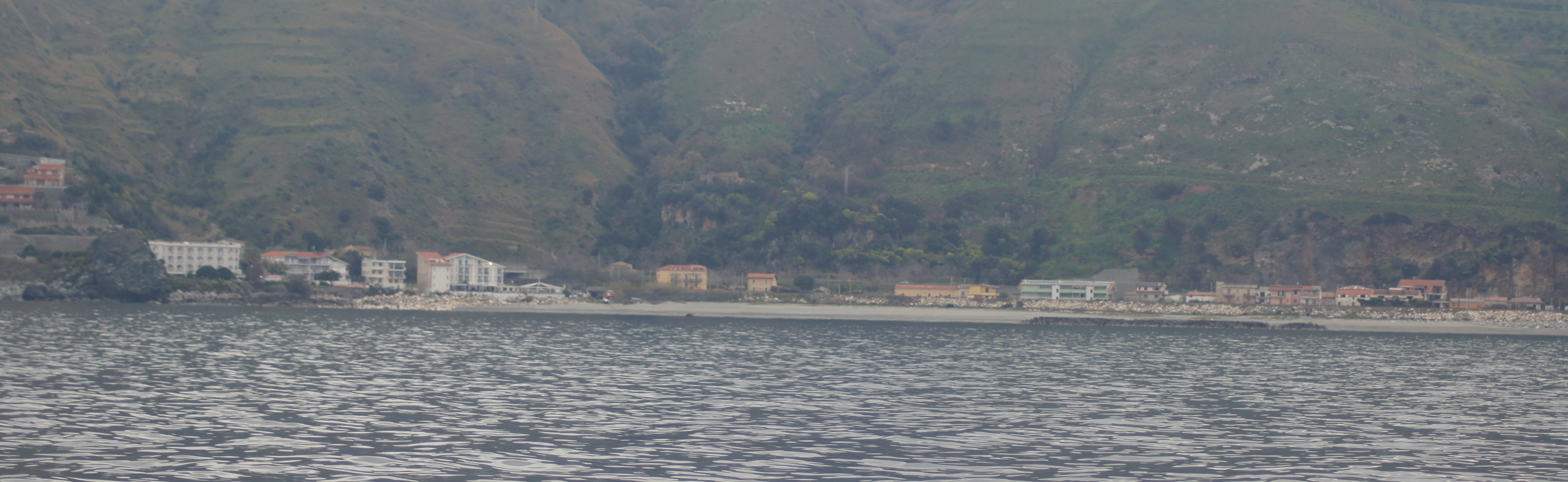

- Location of Coreca in Italy
- Coordinates: 39°4′5″N 16°5′38″E
- Country: Italy
- Region: Calabria
- Province: Cosenza (CS)
- Comune: Amantea

Area
  - Total: 4 km^{2} (1.5 sq mi)
- Elevation: 18 m (59 ft)

Population (1 January 2017)
  - Total: 700
  - Density: 180/km^{2} (450/sq mi)
- Demonym(s): Corachesi (in English) Corachese
- Time zone: UTC+1 (CET)
  - Summer (DST): UTC+2 (CEST)
- Postal code: 87032
- Dialing code: 0982
- Patron saint: Our Lady of the Angels
- Saint day: 22 August

Coreca [ˈkɔːreka] (Coraca or Corica, in the local dialect variant) is a frazione of the comune (municipality) of Amantea, in the province of Cosenza, Calabria, Italy, located close to Campora San Giovanni.

== Geography ==
=== Borders and territory ===
The southern Tyrrhenian Sea is to the west of Coreca, and the city of Amantea is to the south, where the border starts at Campora San Giovanni. The territory consists mainly of a rocky promontory, and the city center lies in the plain. It also includes a hilly area and wide beaches. The climate is typically Mediterranean, characterized by mild and humid winters and hot, dry and windy summers with a high percentage of sunny days.

== Economy ==
The primary source of wealth in Coreca, as well as in nearby Campora San Giovanni, is the tourism and hotel sector, developed thanks to the scenic coastline: popular are the Coreca Reefs, photographed since the 1960s and used by amateur radio enthusiasts. There are also some small factories where food, furniture and machinery are manufactured.

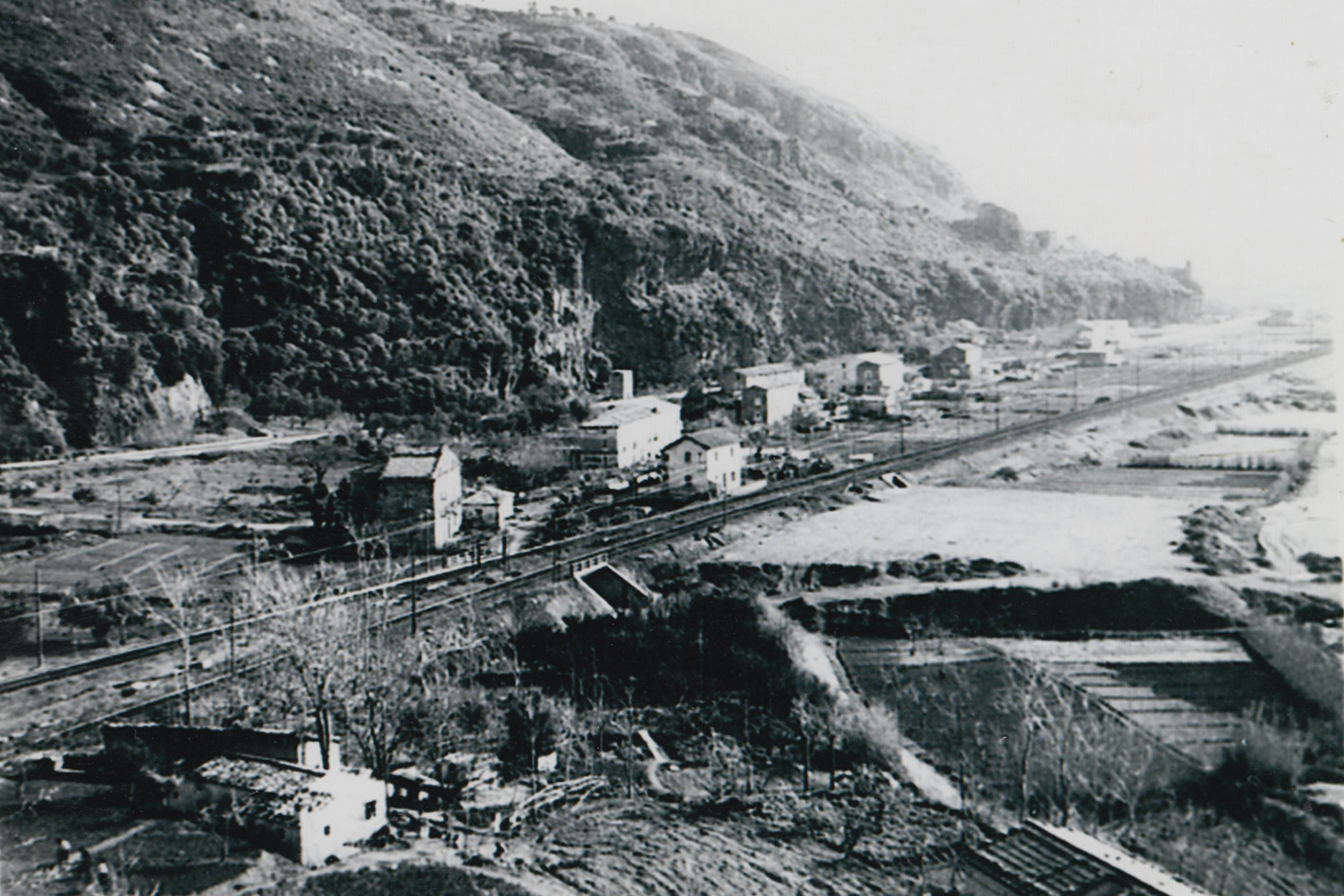
Coreca on 1950s

== Hamlets ==
From 2017 the territory of Coreca is divided into the following hamlets:

- Formiciche
- Giascogne (in local dialect Juascugnu)
- Grotte (in local dialect "i Grutti")
- La Pietra (in local dialect a Petraja)
- Marinella (from 2011)
- Oliva (from 2011)
- Stritture (belonging to Campora San Giovanni between 2008 and 2011)
- Salto da Zita
- Scogliera

== History ==
In antiquity, Greek settlers arrived from Corinth and named the area Κόρακας (Korakas), which means the place of the crows. There was no autonomous human settlement in the region, although there was a sort of stopover with a small port, named Ager Caricum in Roman times and so designated on some maps until the early eighteenth century. This stopover is on the roads between Temesa and Terina and was a departure point for the Aeolian Islands, which are located 65 miles (105 km) from the coast of Coreca. Ager Caricum provided the old name for the Corica dialect. The place remained a lookout point over the centuries, but was not significantly developed.

The population is descended in part from some families from neighboring villages who have arrived since 1800.

In 1943, Coreca was a strategic point for Allied operations, especially thanks to the Turriella, a fort of Arab-Norman origin, used by British and Americans troop for Morse signaling operations. The Tonnara gatehouse, nowadays in ruins, was also of strategic importance during the Second World War.

In the 1950s, given the shortage of work and the misery of the post-war period, several inhabitants emigrated to Venezuela in the hope of a better future and a return to their native country once they had made their fortunes. In the 1960s, thanks to the economic boom and the revival of the Italian economy, Coreca became a tourist destination and a popular destination for amateur radio enthusiasts thanks to its geography.

On May 20, 1974, as a result of tourism, the locality was promoted by presidential decree to the status of frazione.

In the early 1990s, Coreca began to decline. The comparative underdevelopment of its various facilities and services benefitted the nearby Campora San Giovanni and the municipal capital. In 2008, the frazione annexed by municipal decree the territory of Marinella, Oliva and Stritture, and expanded in size from 2.5 square kilometres (0.97 mi^{2}) to 4 square kilometres (1.5 mi^{2}) .

A private broadcaster (Radio Coreca), one of the first pioneers of private broadcasting, lasted a short time and closed in 1996.

Beginning in 2013, there have been attempts to revive Coreca in part though local youth and other cultural associations, especially the Associazione Promo Riviera degli Oleandri led by Pasquale Bruno since 2013.

== Monuments and places of interest ==
=== Church of Our Lady of the Angels ===
On October 1, 1964, work began on the construction of the Church of Coreca, which is dedicated to Our Lady of the Angels, the work ending in 1965 in the presence of the authorities of the time. The church is of modern but sober style, able to hold 65 people. Every year during the patronal feast (August 22) there is a procession through the central streets.

=== Piazza Madonna degli Angeli ===
On April 2, 2003, a municipal resolution was passed and on 5 May 2005, work began on the construction of the central square in order to host the summer events of the hamlet. Since 2015 it has been named after the Madonna degli Angeli because of the proximity to the little Church of Our Lady of the Angels and also because of the presence of a small niche with a statue of the Virgin Mary in it. The square has been cleaned and maintained for communal use by a local tourist association since 2013, especially the Associazione Promo Riviera degli Oleandri led by Pasquale Bruno.

=== Coreca's Caves ===
The iron mines of ancient Temesa are very important in the area. During World War II they were used as a refuge for local residents and for British and American soldiers who used them as warehouses. The caves were later used for Christmas and Easter events until the early 2000s.

=== Tower of Coreca or "Turriella" ===
The Tower of Coreca is located north of the village of Coreca, on the slopes of the Tuvulo hill. This tower, partly collapsed on the first floor, is of some historical importance. It is perceived as a crucible of styles that have been followed over the centuries> It was used as a lookout post by the Arabs, then Normans and various lords up to the arrival of Nazi troops and then British and American ones during the Second World War. Turriella can be reached by the Tonnara road to the north and the road from Marinella to the south.

== Photogallery ==
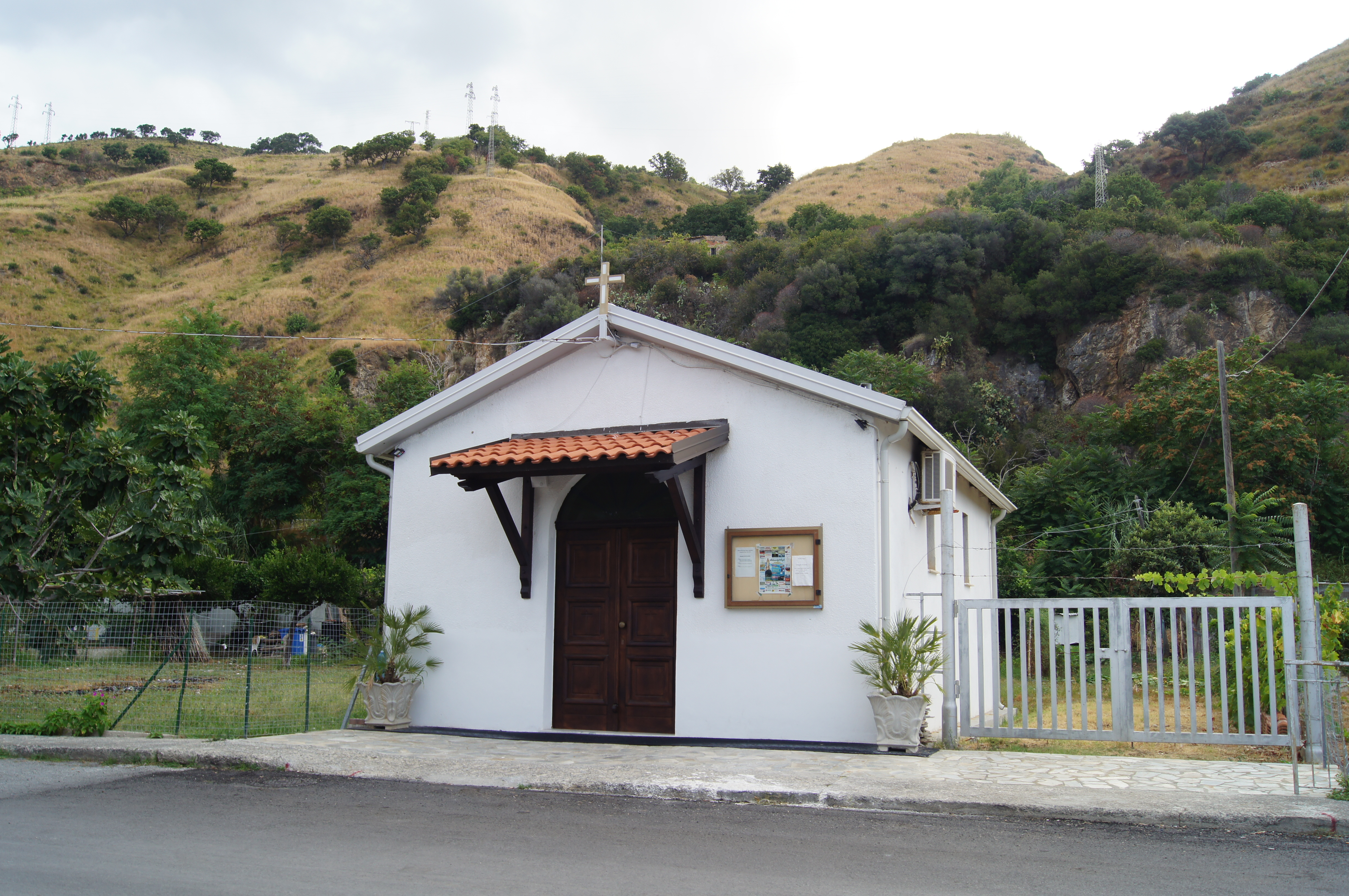
Church of Our Lady of the Angels in Coreca

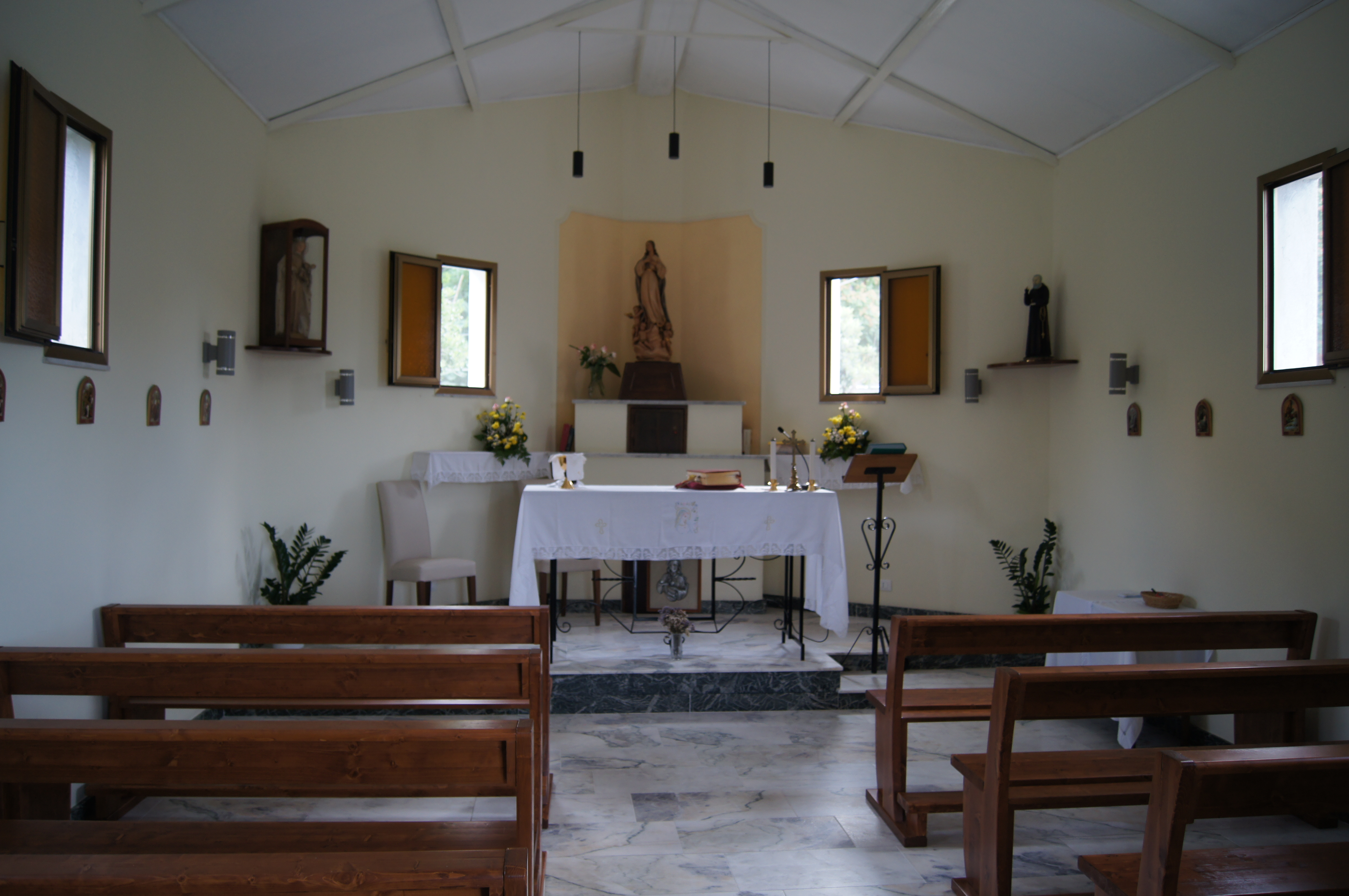
Interior of the Coreca Church

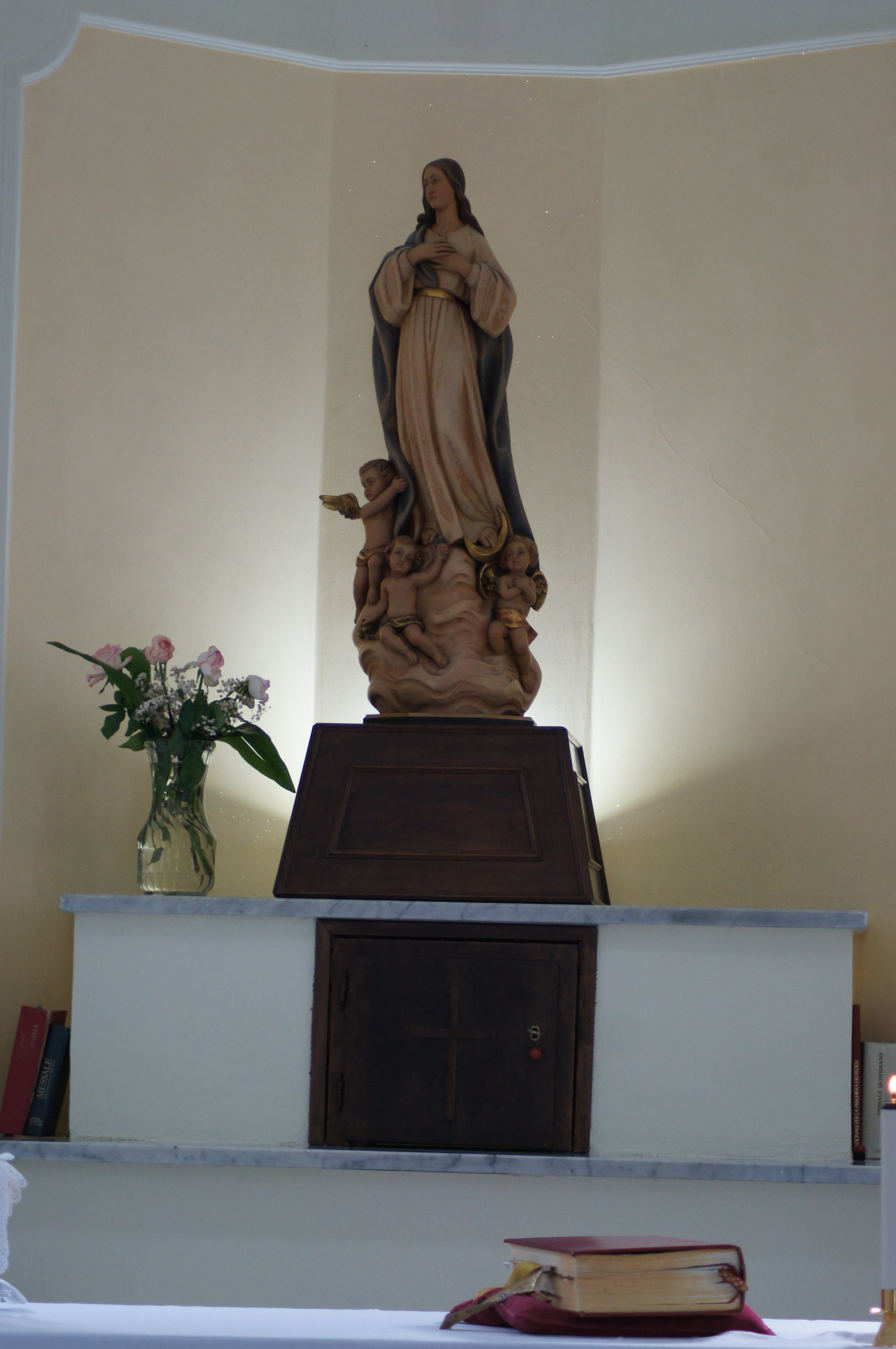
Statue of Our Lady of the Angels in Coreca

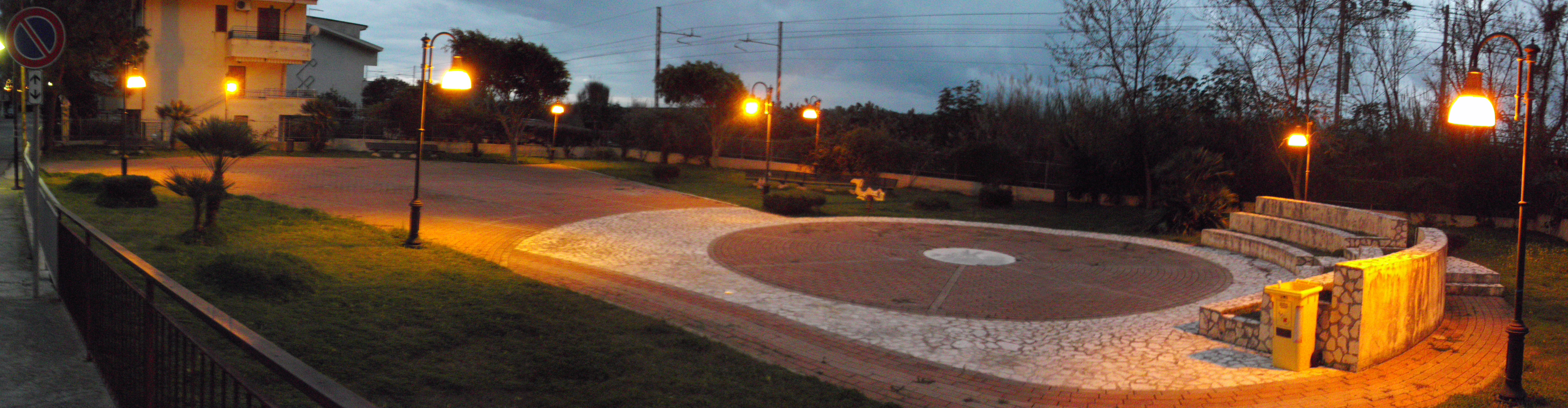
The square of Coreca in an evening view

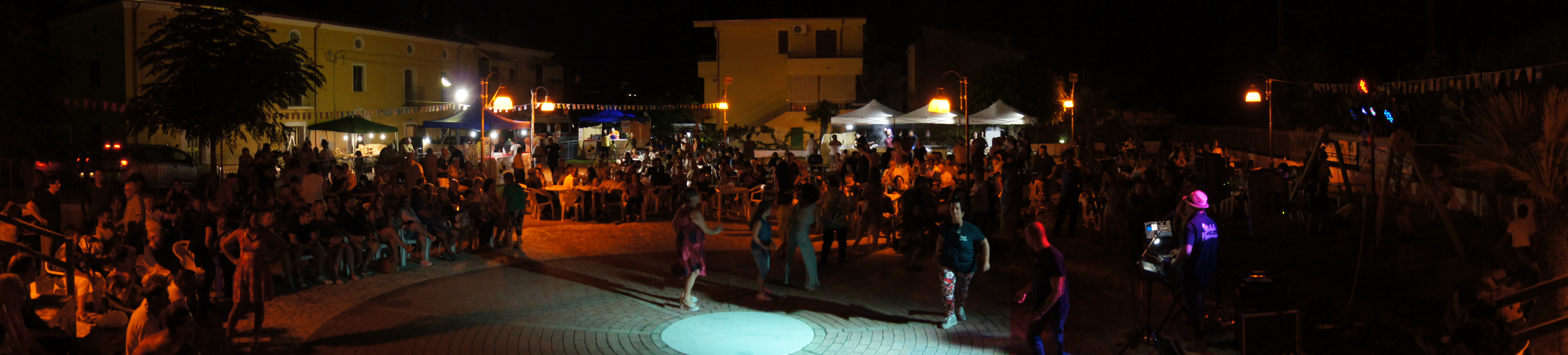
The Coreca's Square in a panoramic night view

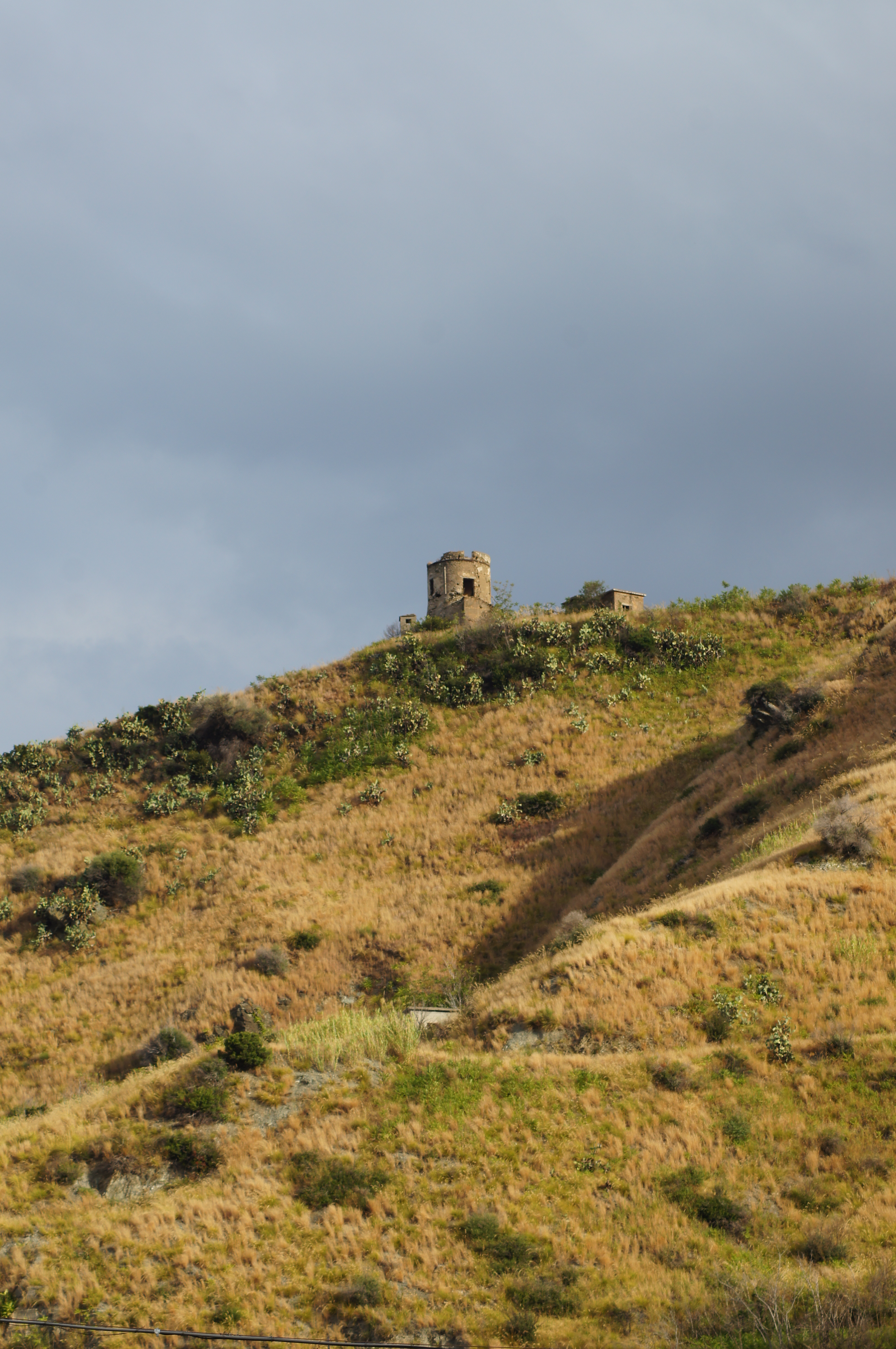
The tower "Turriella"

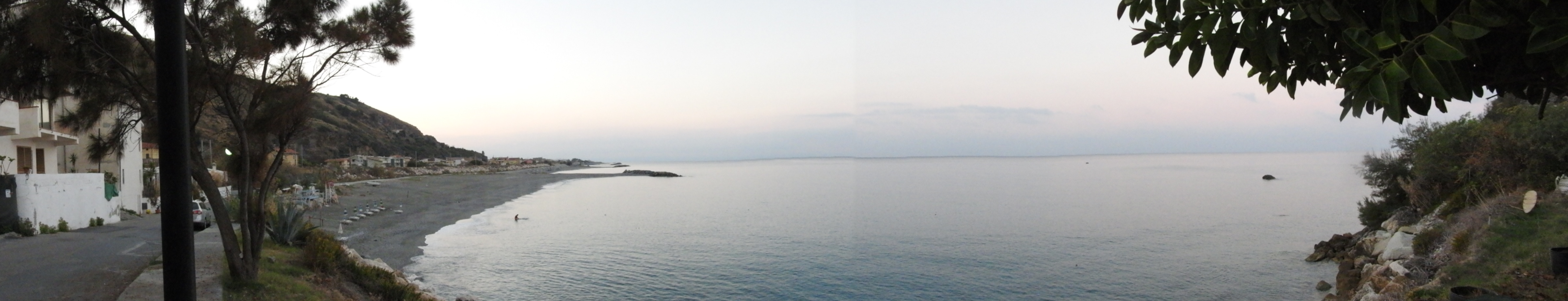
The Coreca's Bay

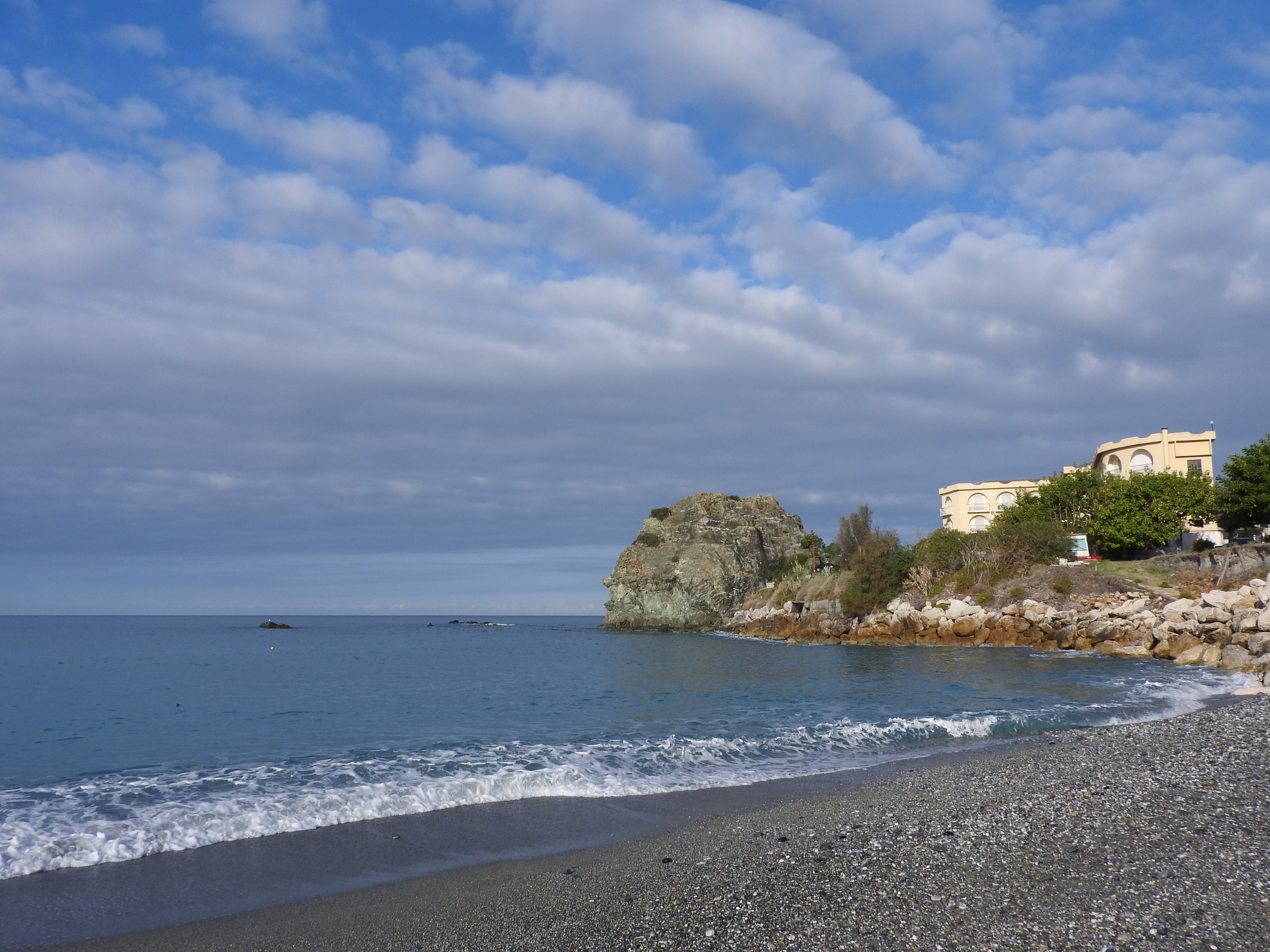
Coreca Beach seen from La Scogliera

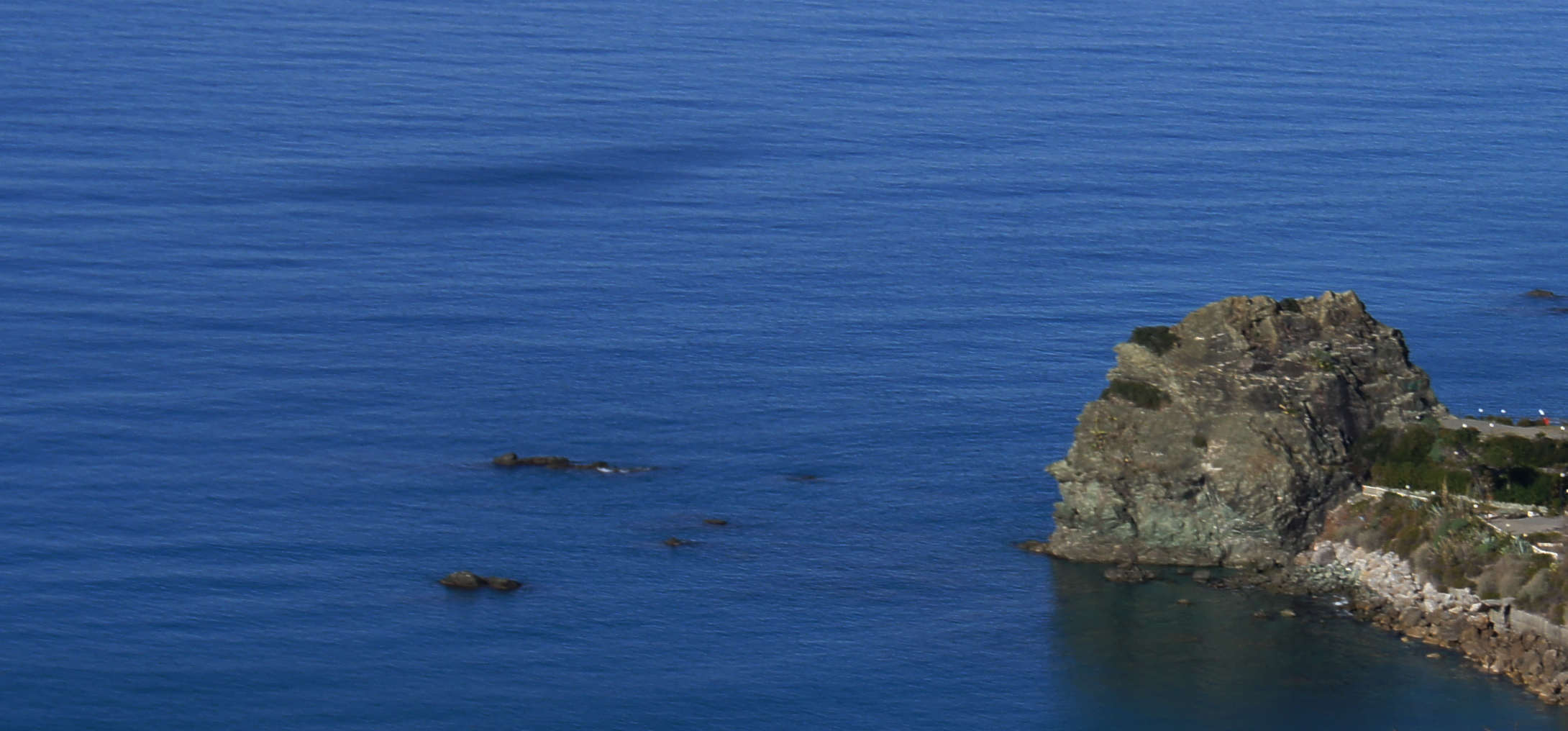
Coreca Reefs

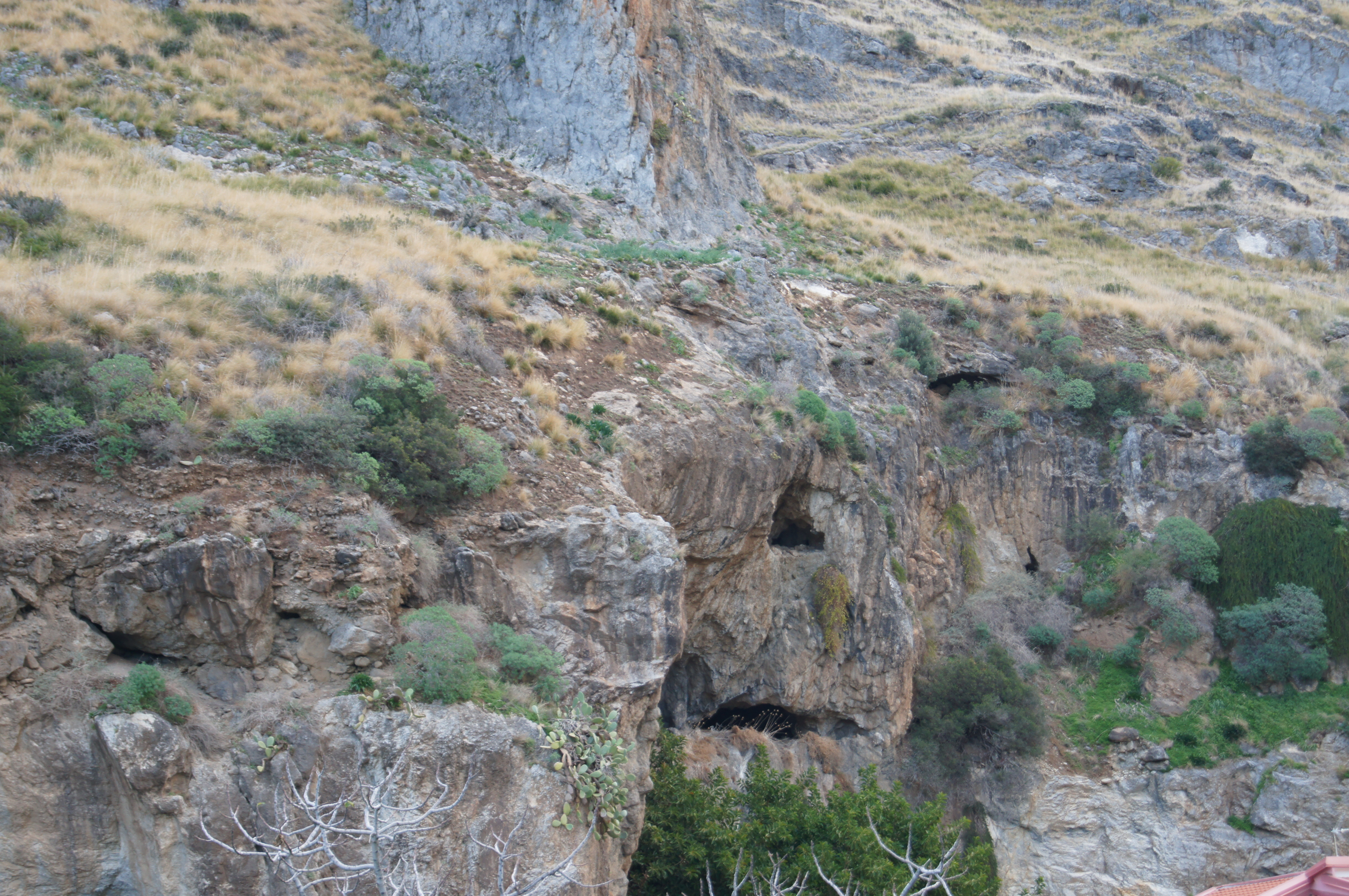
Coreca Cave

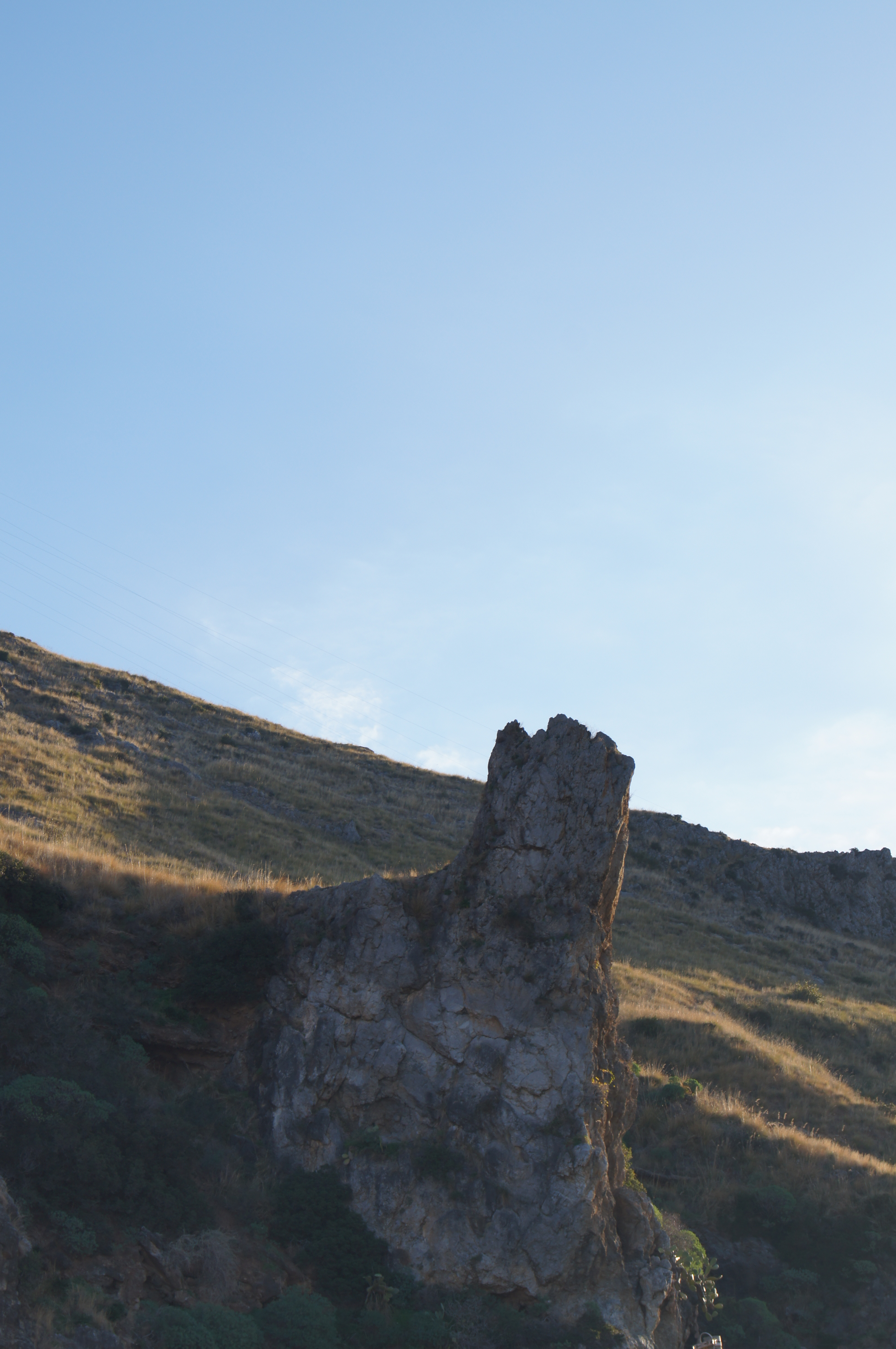
Salto da Zita (Bride's Jump)
