= Wigpool Ironstone Mine =

Biological Site of Special Scientific Interest in Gloucestershire, England

- Site of Special Scientific Interest
- Location within Gloucestershire
- Location of Wigpool Ironstone Mine.
- Area of search: Gloucestershire
- Grid reference: SO654197
- Coordinates: 51.875241°N 2.503272°W
- Interest: Biological
- Area: 34.88 ha (86.2 acres)
- Notification date: 1998

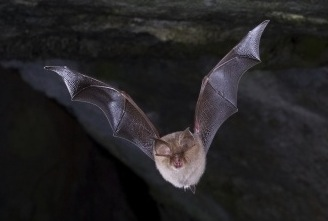
Example - Lesser Horseshoe Bat (Rhinolophus hipposideros)

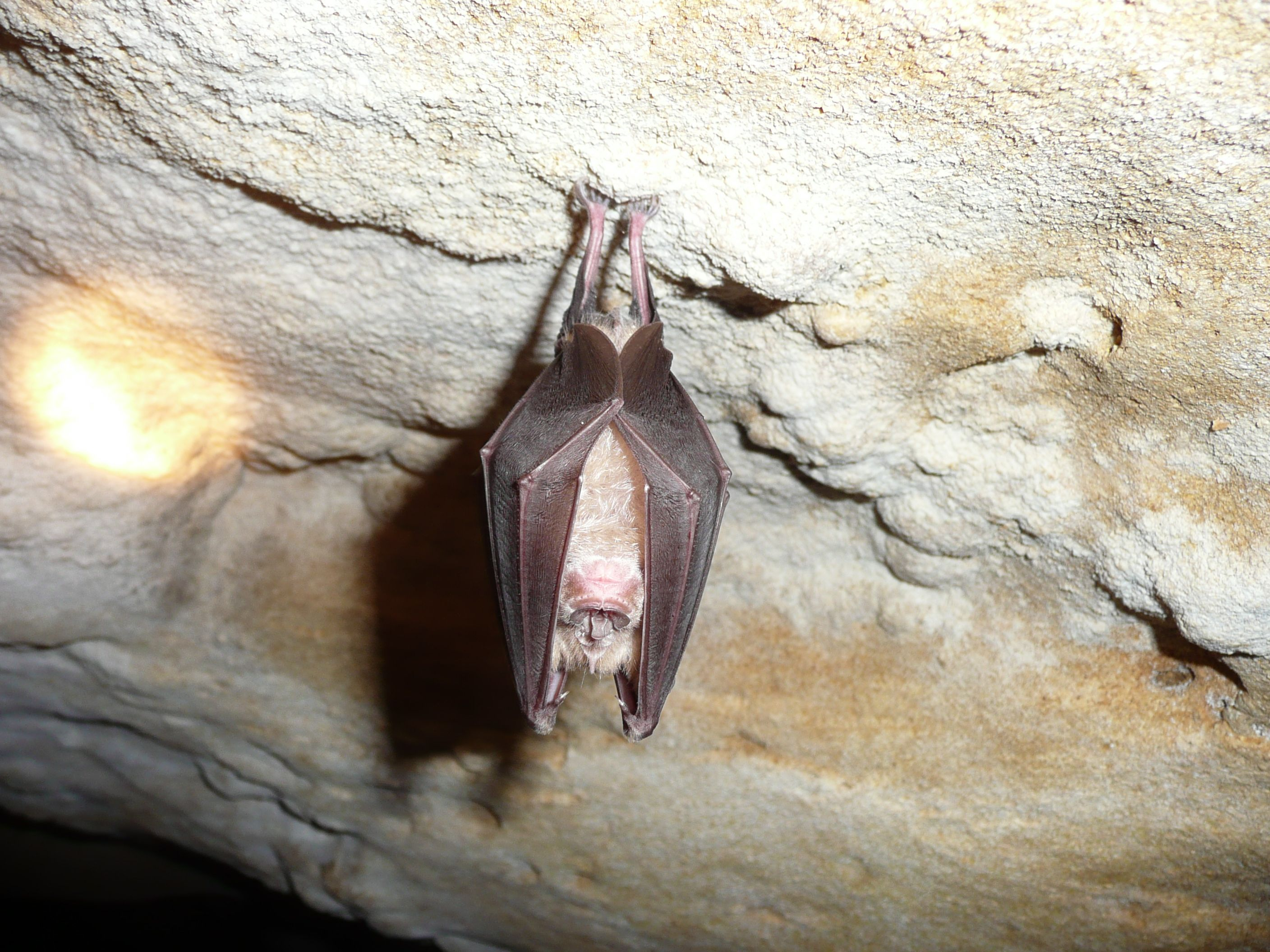
Example - Greater Horseshoe Bat (Rhinolophus ferrumequinum)

Wigpool Ironstone Mine (grid reference SO654197) is a 34.88-hectare (86.2-acre) biological Site of Special Scientific Interest in Gloucestershire, notified in 1998.

== Location and habitat ==
The mine is one of a series of Sites of Special Scientific Interest within the Forest of Dean and Wye Valley (Gloucestershire and Monmouthshire). These sites support (between them) breeding and hibernation roosts for Lesser and Greater horseshoe bats. This is of European importance. Other sites in the group in Gloucestershire (all of which are SSSIs) include the breeding sites of Blaisdon Hall, Caerwood And Ashberry Goose House, Dean Hall Coach House & Cellar and Sylvan House Barn. Hibernation sites include Buckshraft Mine & Bradley Hill Railway Tunnel, Devil's Chapel Scowles, Old Bow And Old Ham Mines and Westbury Brook Ironstone Mine.

The deciduous woodlands and sheltered valleys of the Forest of Dean and the Wye Valley provide a good feeding area, and the underground systems provide roosting and breeding sites. A ring of iron-ore bearing Carboniferous Limestone in the Forest of Dean has created a series of ancient and more recent mines which provide hibernation sites. The citations for the series of sites provide common information.

Wigpool Ironstone Mine is a recorded hibernation site for both Lesser and Greater Horseshoe bats. The entrances to the site are gated and grilled to protect the bats from interference and Natural England reports that all ten of them were checked by the Forest of Dean Caving Conservation and Access Group in September 2011. The use of the site by the bats remains good.

Wigpool nature reserve is on the western boundary of Wigpool Ironstone Mine.

== SSSI Source ==
- Natural England SSSI information on the citation
- Natural England SSSI information on the Wigpool Ironstone Mine units

== Audio ==
Lesser horseshoe bat recorded on a heterodyne bat detector set to 107 KHz
