= Buckshraft Mine & Bradley Hill Railway Tunnel =

Site of Special Scientific Interest in Gloucestershire, United Kingdom

Buckshaft Mine & Bradley Hill Railway Tunnel
- Site of Special Scientific Interest
- Location within Gloucestershire
- Location of Buckshaft Mine & Bradley Hill Railway Tunnel.
- Area of search: Gloucestershire
- Grid reference: SO655121 and SO662104
- Coordinates: 51.806919°N 2.50106°W
- Interest: Biological
- Area: 5.66 ha (14.0 acres)
- Notification date: 1998

Buckshaft Mine & Bradley Hill Railway Tunnel (SO655121 and SO662104) is a 5.66-hectare (14.0-acre) biological Site of Special Scientific Interest in Gloucestershire, notified in 1998. This site comprises two separate locations. One is Buckshaft Mine which is near the village of Ruspidge. The other location is Bradley Hill Railway Tunnel which is near the village of Soudley.

== Location and habitat ==
The mine and railway tunnel comprise one of a series of Sites of Special Scientific Interest within the Forest of Dean and Wye Valley (Gloucestershire and Monmouthshire). These sites support (between them) breeding and hibernation roosts for Lesser and Greater horseshoe bats. This is of European importance. Other sites in the group in Gloucestershire (all of which are SSSIs) include the breeding sites of Blaisdon Hall, Caerwood And Ashberry Goose House, Dean Hall Coach House & Cellar and Sylvan House Barn. Hibernation sites include Devil's Chapel Scowles, Old Bow And Old Ham Mines, Westbury Brook Ironstone Mine and Wigpool Ironstone Mine.

The Buckshaft Mine and Bradley Railway Tunnel sites are mostly used by Greater Horseshoe bats, but a small number of Lesser Horseshoe bats also use the sites.

Greater horseshoe bats from the breeding roost at Woodchester Park hibernate at Buckshaft Mine which is at least 15 kilometres away.

The deciduous woodlands and sheltered valleys of the Forest of Dean and the Wye Valley provide a good feeding area, and the underground systems provide roosting and breeding sites. A ring of iron-ore bearing Carboniferous Limestone in the Forest of Dean has created a series of ancient and more recent mines which provide hibernation sites.

The citations for the series of sites provide common information.

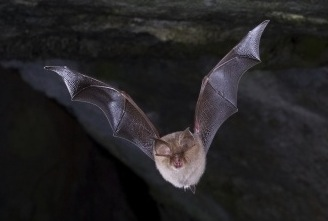
Example - Lesser Horseshoe Bat (Rhinolophus hipposideros)

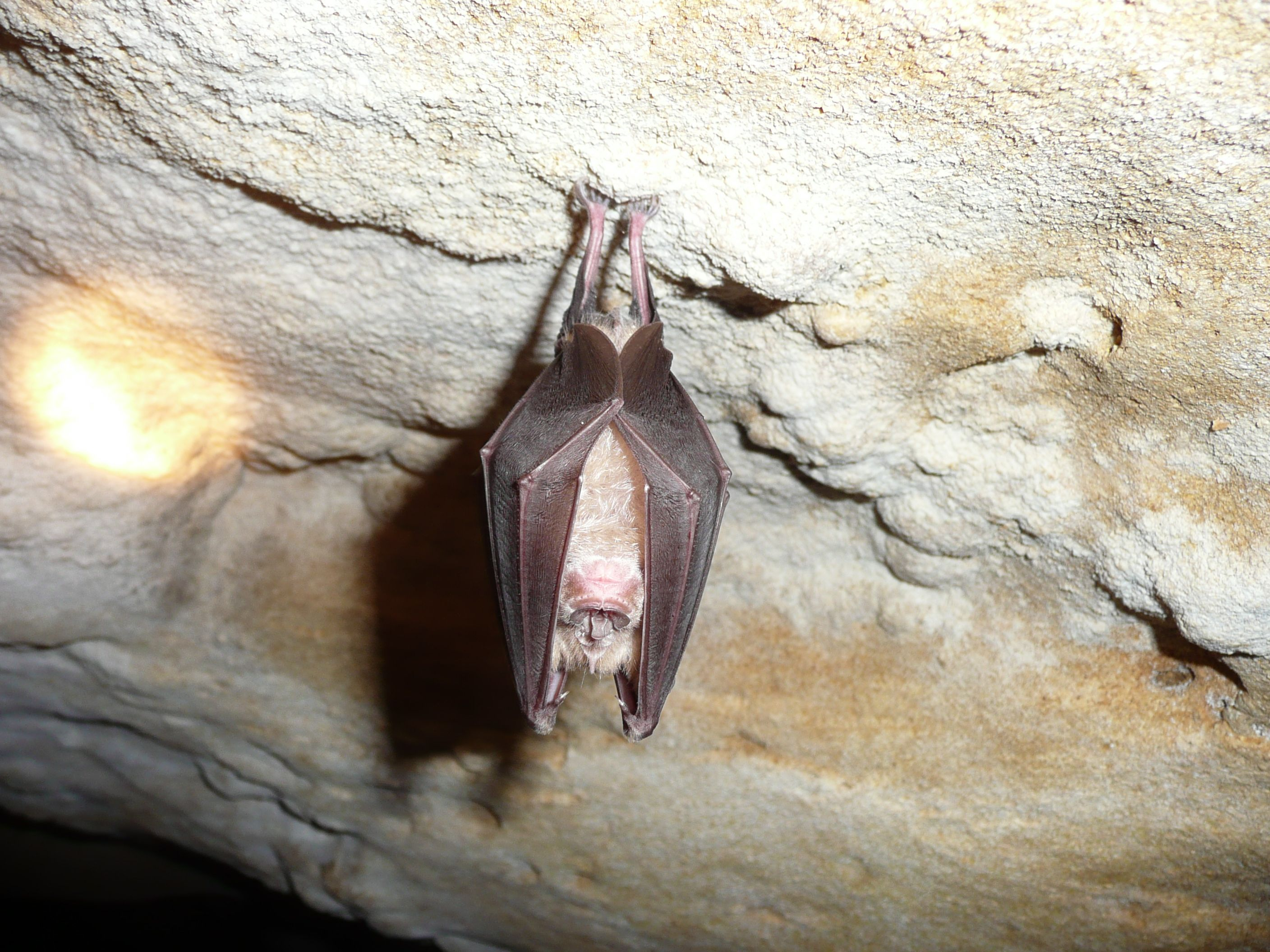
Example - Greater Horseshoe Bat (Rhinolophus ferrumequinum)

== SSSI Source ==
- Natural England SSSI information on the citation
- Natural England SSSI information on the Buckshaft Mine & Bradley Hill Railway Tunnel units
