= Devil's Chapel Scowles =

Biological Site of Special Scientific Interest in Gloucestershire, England

- Site of Special Scientific Interest
- Location within Gloucestershire
- Location of Devil's Chapel Scowles.
- Area of search: Gloucestershire
- Grid reference: SO606045
- Coordinates: 51.738266°N 2.571262°W
- Interest: Biological
- Area: 44.79 ha (110.7 acres)
- Notification date: 1998

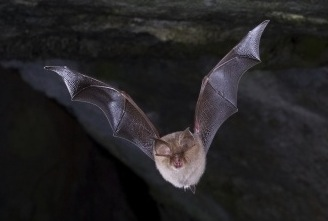
Example - Lesser Horseshoe Bat (Rhinolophus hipposideros)

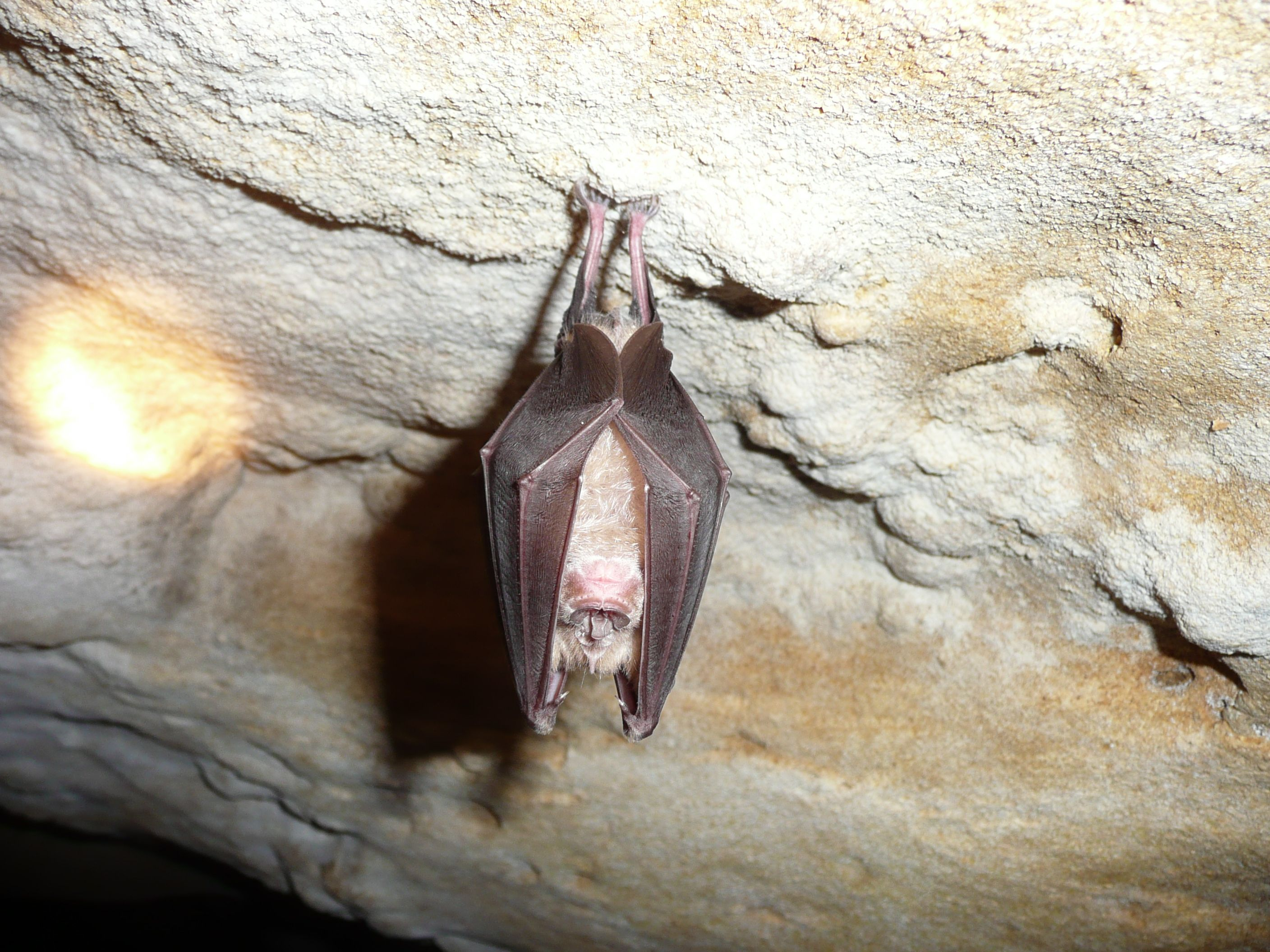
Example - Greater Horseshoe Bat (Rhinolophus ferrumequinum)

Devil's Chapel Scowles (grid reference SO606045) is a 44.79-hectare (110.7-acre) biological Site of Special Scientific Interest in Gloucestershire, notified England, in 1998. The site lies in the Forest of Dean and has four units of assessment by Natural England.

== Scowles ==
Scowle is the ancient name for certain limestone outcrops located in the Forest of Dean. These are important in folk memory and in the local heritage. The pits, holes and features called scowles occur in the centre of the Dean and normally contain iron ore, which gave rise to mining in the area. This has given the impression these are the result of human activity. Scowles are formed by a geological process.

Scowles are wildlife rich, and the minimum disturbance in the area has been beneficial. Habitats range from endangered limestone grassland to acid heathland, which are conservation priorities in Gloucestershire's Biodiversity Action Plan. Of prime importance is that the scowle areas support threatened species of bat. These creature hibernate in the deeper mines which are accessed at scowle formations.

== Location ==
This site is one of a series of Sites of Special Scientific Interest within the Forest of Dean and Wye Valley (Gloucestershire and Monmouthshire) notified for the Lesser and Greater horseshoe bat populations. The sites, between them, include both breeding and hibernation roosts. This is of European importance. Other sites which form part of this series in Gloucestershire include the breeding sites of Blaisdon Hall, Caerwood And Ashberry Goose House, Dean Hall Coach House & Cellar, and Sylvan House Barn. Hibernation sites include Buckshraft Mine & Bradley Hill Railway Tunnel, Old Bow And Old Ham Mines, Westbury Brook Ironstone Mine and Wigpool Ironstone Mine.

The deciduous woodlands and sheltered valleys of the Forest of Dean and the Wye Valley provide a good feeding area, and the underground systems provide roosting and breeding sites. The citations for the series of sites provide common information.

== Publications ==
- Scowles in the Forest of Dean – their formation, history and wildlife, (undated), Gloucestershire Wildlife Trust, Gloucestershire County Council Archaeology Service, Gloucestershire Geoconservation Trust, English Heritage and English Nature (now Natural England) joint publication

== SSSI Source ==
- Natural England SSSI information on the citation
- Natural England SSSI information on the Devil's Chapel Scowles units
