= Caerwood and Ashberry Goose House =

Biological Site of Special Scientific Interest in Gloucestershire, England

Caerwood And Ashberry Goose House
- Site of Special Scientific Interest
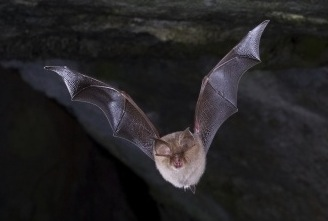
- Example - Lesser Horseshoe Bat (Rhinolophus hipposideros)
- Location of Caerwood And Ashberry Goose House.
- Area of search: Gloucestershire
- Grid reference: ST54719655 & ST54649657
- Coordinates: 51.665937°N 2.656165°W
- Interest: Biological
- Area: 0.01 ha (0.025 acres)
- Notification date: 1991

Caerwood And Ashberry Goose House (ST54719655 ST54649657) is a 0.01-hectare (0.025-acre) biological Site of Special Scientific Interest in Gloucestershire, England, notified in 1991. The site was previously notified as Caerwood, Tidenham and lies within the Wye Valley Area of Outstanding Natural Beauty.

== Location and habitat ==
The site is notified for its nationally important breeding roosts of Lesser horseshoe bats (one of three sites in Gloucestershire). It lies at the top of the wooded gorge slopes of the Wye Valley and at the southernmost tip of the Forest of Dean.

The site comprises one of a series of Sites of Special Scientific Interest within the Forest of Dean and Wye Valley (Gloucestershire and Monmouthshire). These sites support (between them) breeding and hibernation roosts for Lesser and Greater horseshoe bats. This is of European importance. Other sites in the group in Gloucestershire (all of which are SSSIs) include the breeding sites of Blaisdon Hall, Dean Hall Coach House & Cellar and Sylvan House Barn. Hibernation sites include Buckshraft Mine & Bradley Hill Railway Tunnel, Devil's Chapel Scowles, Old Bow And Old Ham Mines, Westbury Brook Ironstone Mine, and Wigpool Ironstone Mine.

The deciduous woodlands and sheltered valleys of the Forest of Dean and the Wye Valley provide a good feeding area, and the underground systems provide roosting and breeding sites. A ring of iron-ore bearing Carboniferous Limestone in the Forest of Dean has created a series of ancient and more recent mines which provide hibernation sites. The citations for the series of sites provide common information.

Wye Valley and Forest of Dean Bat Sites/ Safleoedd Ystlumod Dyffryn Gwy a Fforest y Ddena are recognised as a Special Area of Conservation (SAC) under the EU Habitats Directive.

== Building space ==
The site comprises the roof spaces of two buildings which are used seasonally as lesser horseshoe bat nursery roosts. There are indications that the site may have been used for over fifty years. The site is also used as a nursery roost by Pipistrelle bats (Pipistrellus pipistrellus).

== SSSI Source ==
- Natural England SSSI information on the citation
- Natural England SSSI information on the Caerwood And Ashberry Goose House units
