= Clearwell Caves =

Cave system in Clearwell, England

Clearwell
- Location within Gloucestershire
- Location: Clearwell, Forest of Dean, Gloucestershire
- Coordinates: 51°46′16″N 2°36′52″W
- Entrances: 1
- Access: Public
- Lighting: Yes
- Visitors: Yes
- Features: Ochre. Lake

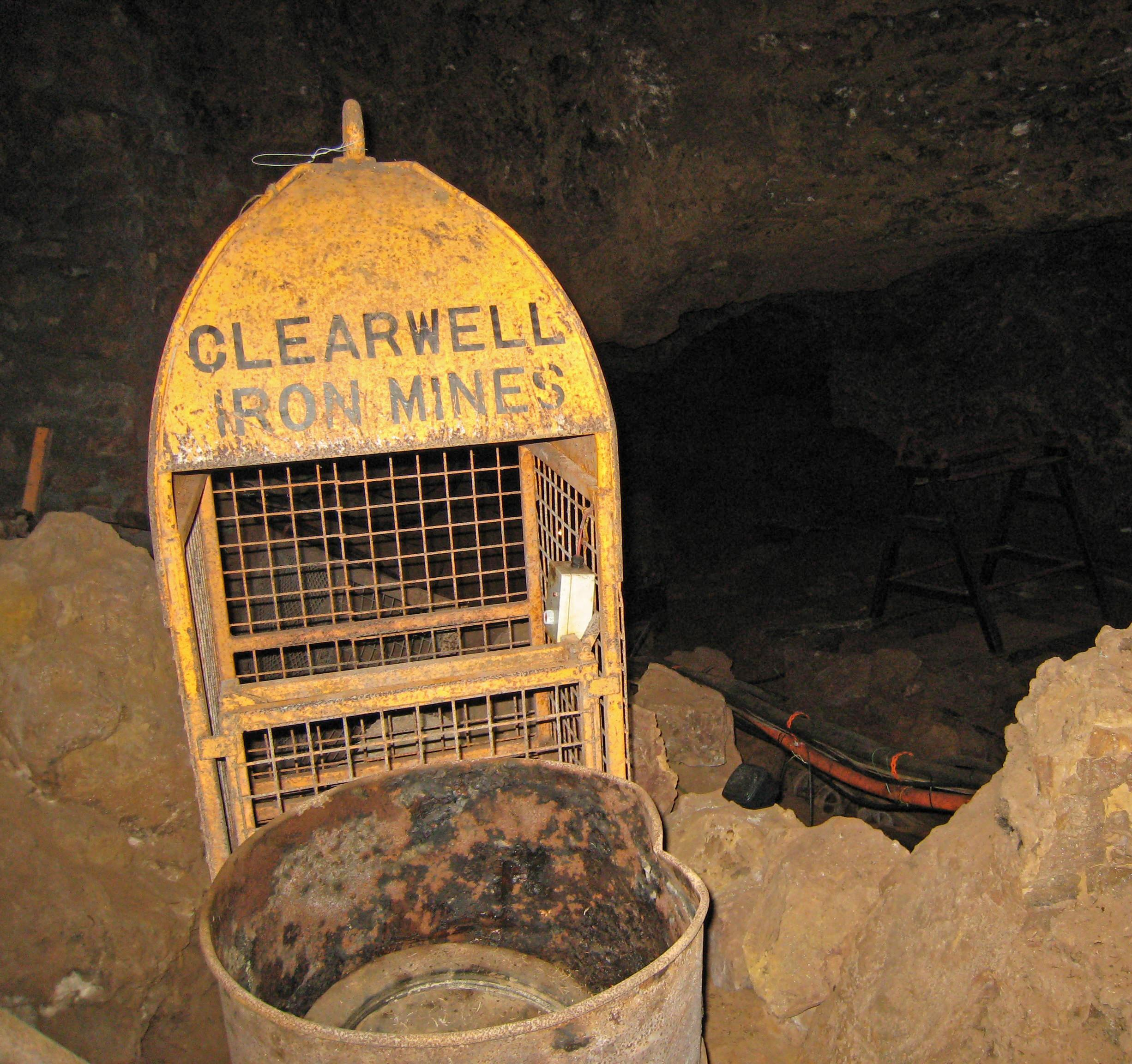
Equipment inside the now preserved Clearwell Mine.

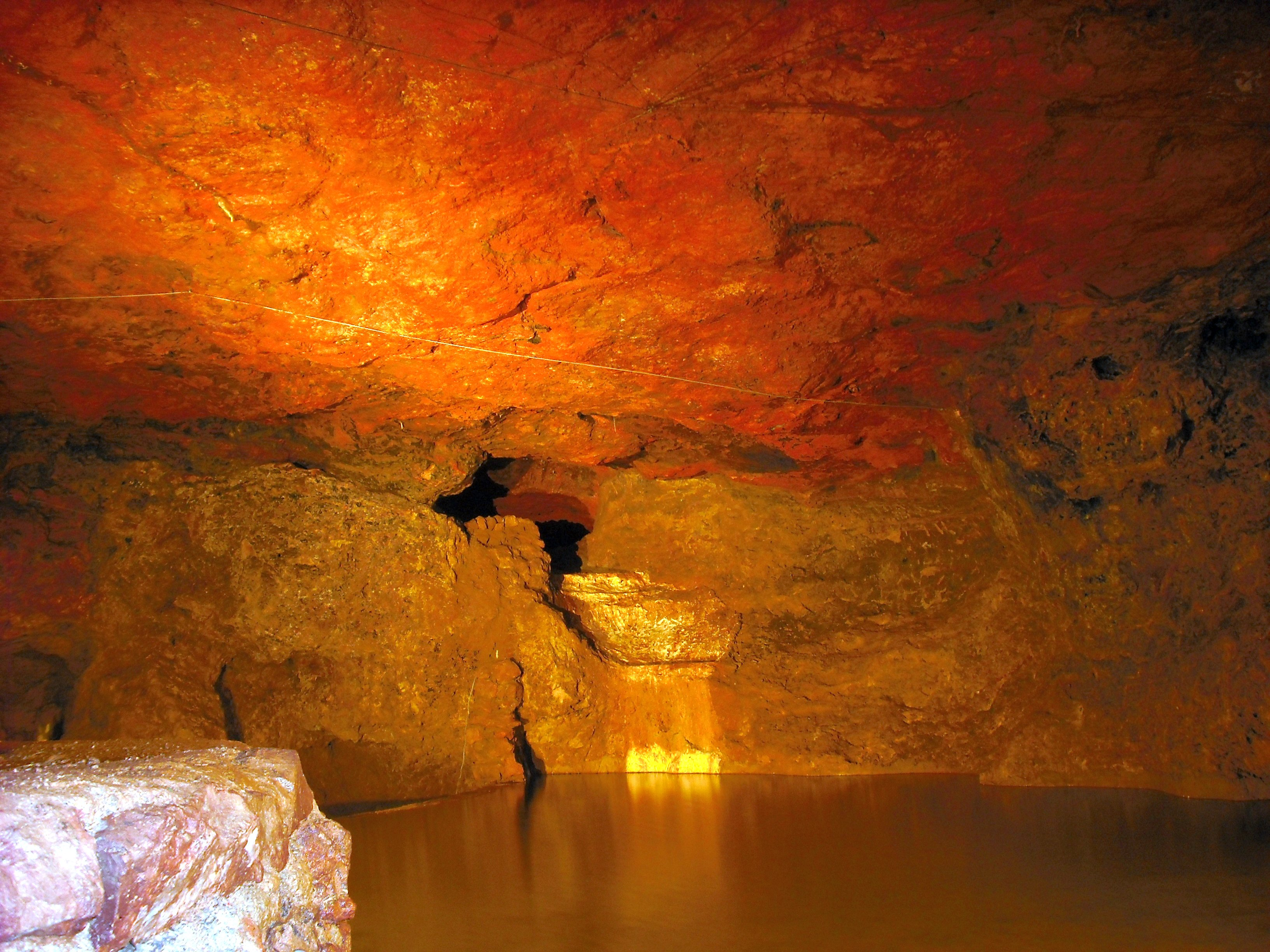
Pool of water within the mine. Note the red ochre colour of the roof

Clearwell Caves, at Clearwell in the Forest of Dean, Gloucestershire, England, is a natural cave system which has been extensively mined for iron ore. It now operates primarily as a working mining museum.

The caves are part of a Natural England designated Site of Special Scientific Interest and the Wye Valley Special Area of Conservation; the notification is due to the large number of lesser horseshoe bats. The designation includes parts of Clearwell, along with Old Bow, Lambsquay and Old Ham mine complexes.

== Mining ==
Clearwell Caves are a collection of five mines: Clearwell, Old Ham, Lambsquay, Old Bow and New Dun, covering approximately 230 acres. The interconnected cave systems were formed by underground streams from around 180 million years ago. Since the late Stone Age they were mined originally for ochre, then for iron ore from Iron Age times Circa 100BC increasing from Roman times and extensively during the 19th century, which considerably enlarged and extended the network of natural caverns.

The mines were well known for their Ochre production mined for over 4,500 years.

The nearby scowles around the Forest of Dean, including Puzzlewood represent early shallow surface mining, where surface working later became entrances to these deeper mines as early miners worked beyond daylight to follow the ore.

Clearwell Caves are still worked to produce coloured ochres for use by artists as natural pigments. These are washed and milled for sale in the mine's ochre workshop. A range of ochre colours are available from the mine shop, from golden yellow to English Reds. Clearwell is one of the few locations in the world where natural deep purple ochre, particularly caput mortuum is found.

Ten well lit chambers have been made easily accessible to visitors, with displays throughout. There is a small museum, shop and café. A network of much deeper workings can be visited in the presence of an experienced guide and with appropriate caving equipment for safety. The upper caves are open to the general visitor.

== Recreational use ==
Parts of the caves were originally opened to the public by Ray Wright (1930-2015) from 1968 and are now managed by his son Jonathan Wright, who is a Freeminer, still mining ochre from the workings. Since the 1980s, the caves have been used as a Santa's Grotto at Christmas time, for Easter egg hunts and functions such as music concerts and theatrical performances. One chamber is large enough to host an annual Halloween Party for over 300 people. Parts of the Doctor Who episodes "The Christmas Invasion" (2005), "The Satan Pit" (2006) and "Time of the Angels" / "Flesh and Stone" (2010) were filmed in the caves.

All the underground scenes of the BBC series "Merlin", were filmed in the Caves. The Caves have also long been used for filming science fiction scenes, such as in Blake's 7 - Horizon. The Caves featured substantially in the children's series "The Changes", "The Jensen Code" and "Kidnapped" among many others. More recently the caves have been featured in episodes of Britannia, Cursed, His Dark Materials, Willow (TV series), The Winter King and Pig Man's house in the channel 4 comedy series - The Change.

== Reported paranormal activity ==
Frequent claims of paranormal phenomena at the Caves have been made over the years. These include reported sightings, the sound of metal clanging in the distance, and many reported sightings of an old miner, the sound of footsteps and pick axes working.

== In popular culture ==
The caves were used as the interior for the Sycorax spaceship in the Doctor Who Christmas special, The Christmas Invasion in 2005.

== See also ==
- Old Bow And Old Ham Mines
