= Tudor Farm Bank =

Protected area in Gloucestershire, England

- Site of Special Scientific Interest
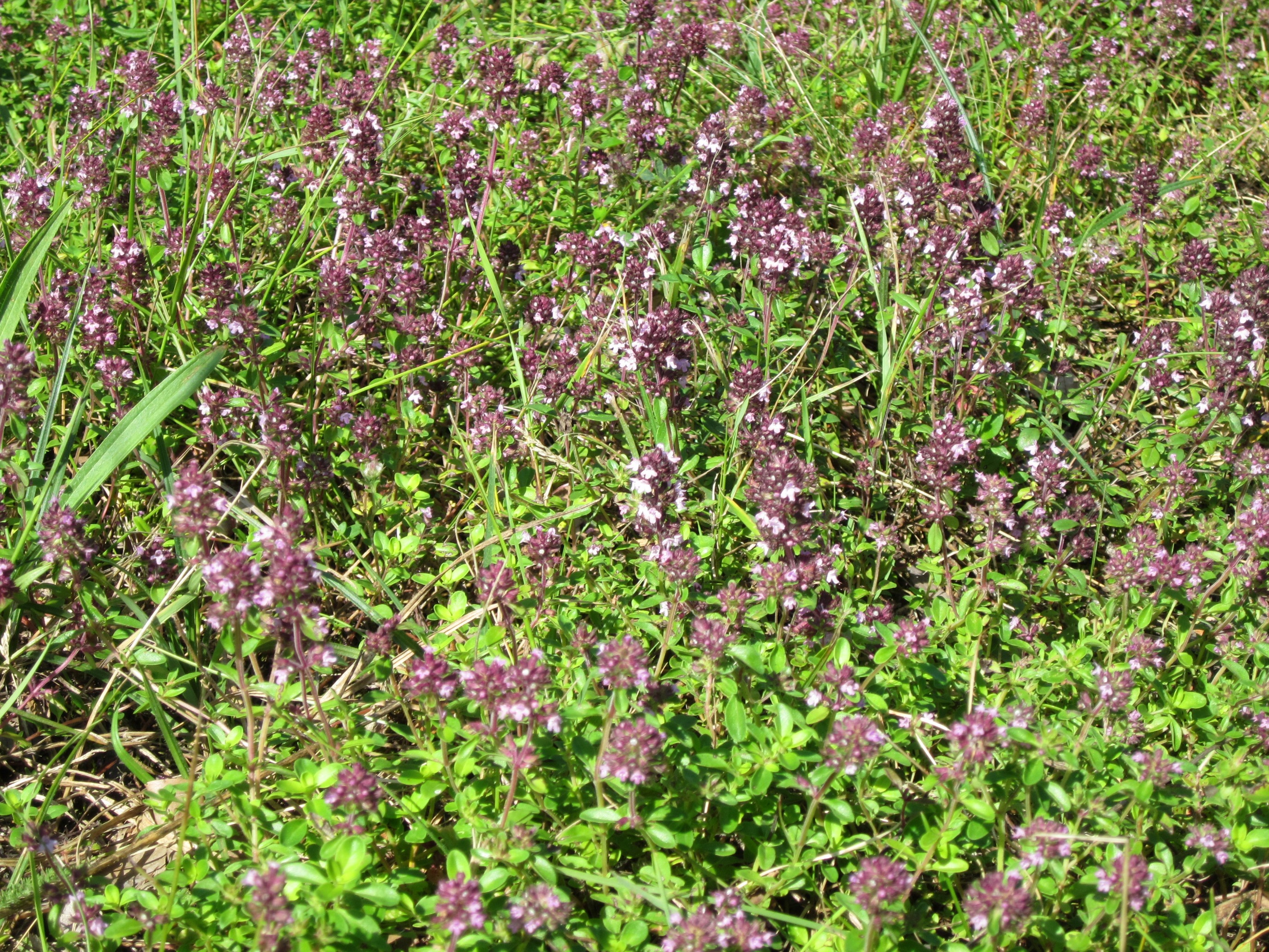
- Example - large thyme (Thymus pulegioides)
- Location of Tudor Farm Bank.
- Area of search: Gloucestershire
- Grid reference: SO573081
- Coordinates: 51.77039°N 2.619492°W
- Interest: Biological
- Area: 3.68 ha (9.1 acres)
- Notification date: 1999

Tudor Farm Bank (grid reference SO573081) is a 3.68-hectare (9.1-acre) biological Site of Special Scientific Interest in Gloucestershire, notified in 1999.

== Location and habitat ==
The site is in the village of Clearwell, which is on the western edge of the Forest of Dean and in west Gloucestershire. It is owned and managed by the Tudor Farmhouse Hotel. The Old Bow and Old Ham Mines SSSI is close by. Tudor Farm Bank is considered to be the biggest remaining grassland site of its type, and is near the westernmost edge of the natural distribution. It lies on a small escarpment and is south-west facing. It is on Carboniferous limestones. The site is designated because of its calcareous grassland and the species it supports. These limestones surround the Forest of Dean. Neutral grassland areas are present at the bottom of the slope and to the west. There are limestone outcrops

== Flora ==
The grassland species include sheep's fescue, quaking grass and glaucous sedge. Herbs include rock-rose, restharrow, Carline thistle, common milkwort and dwarf thistle, yellow-wort, fairy flax, wild thyme and large thyme (Thymus pulegioides). Thyme and common knapweed are plentiful, which is usual for this kind of grassland.

The neutral grassland areas support crested dog's-tail, common knapweed, red fescue, yellow oat-grass, meadow vetchling, common bird's-foot-trefoil, yarrow and ribwort.

Scrub has developed in an area of the site which supports a range of species such as hawthorn, blackthorn, bramble, dog's mercury, cuckoo-pint, hart's-tongue fern and primrose. The area supports a rarity being stinking hellebore.

== Fauna ==
The habitat and flora encourages a good range of invertebrates and butterflies include large skipper, ringlet, marbled white and common blue. The yellow meadow ant thrives on this bank.

== SSSI Source ==
- Natural England SSSI information on the citation
- Natural England SSSI information on the Tudor Farm Bank unit
