= Blaisdon Hall =

Grade II* listed building at Blaisdon in England

- Site of Special Scientific Interest
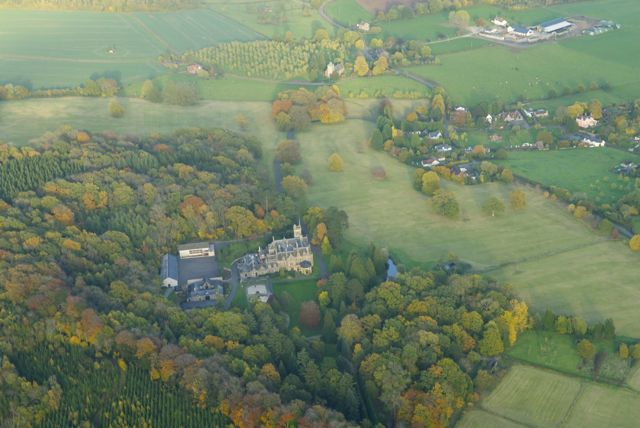
- An aerial photograph of the hall

- Location within Gloucestershire
- Location of Blaisdon Hall.
- Area of search: Gloucestershire
- Grid reference: SO698170
- Coordinates: 51.851222°N 2.439124°W
- Interest: Biological
- Area: 0.07 ha (0.17 acres)
- Notification date: 1995

Blaisdon Hall (grid reference SO698170) is a Grade II* listed building at Blaisdon. It includes a 0.07-hectare (0.17-acre) biological Site of Special Scientific Interest in Gloucestershire, notified in 1995.

Blaisdon Hall supports a breeding roost of Lesser horseshoe bats which consists of one fifth of the known Gloucestershire breeding population, and has been deemed by Natural England to be of national importance. The site comprises part of the roof void, roof tiles, roof timbers, the flanking walls of the Hall and the nearby workshop. Pipistrelle bats and Brown long-eared bats also are recorded using the Hall.

== History ==
The hall was built in 1876 by William Crawshay. It was extended in 1907 by P. Stubbs. In 1935 it was sold and turned into an agricultural school.

== Architecture ==
The two-storey Jacobean style stone building has slate roofs. At the rear are two projecting wings with a courtyard between them. On the right of the front is a four-storey tower with a porte-cochere.

== Location and habitat ==
The site is one of a series of Sites of Special Scientific Interest within the Forest of Dean and Wye Valley (Gloucestershire and Monmouthshire). These sites support (between them) breeding and hibernation roosts for Lesser and Greater horseshoe bats. This is of European importance. Other sites in the group in Gloucestershire (all of which are SSSIs) include the breeding sites of Caerwood And Ashberry Goose House, Dean Hall Coach House & Cellar and Sylvan House Barn. Hibernation sites include Buckshraft Mine & Bradley Hill Railway Tunnel, Devil's Chapel Scowles, Old Bow And Old Ham Mines and Westbury Brook Ironstone Mine.

The Wye Valley and Forest of Dean are one of the main locations for Lesser horseshoe bats because of the deciduous woodlands and, sheltered valleys, which provide a good feeding area, and the underground systems which provide roosting and breeding sites.

The citations for the series of sites provide common information.

Wye Valley and Forest of Dean Bat Sites/ Safleoedd Ystlumod Dyffryn Gwy a Fforest y Ddena are recognised as a Special Area of Conservation (SAC) under the EU Habitats Directive.

== Conservation ==
Natural England reports (unit of assessment report 2011) that the numbers of Lesser horseshoe bats remained the same as at citation (by chance). This was 187 (8 August 2011 count). Roof spaces were not accessed and considered to be inaccessible without causing structural damage and damage to the roost.

== SSSI Source ==
- Natural England SSSI information on the citation
- Natural England SSSI information on the Blaisdon Hall unit
