= Old Bow and Old Ham Mines =

Protected area in Gloucestershire, England

Old Bow And Old Ham Mines
- Site of Special Scientific Interest
- Location within Gloucestershire
- Location of Old Bow And Old Ham Mines.
- Area of search: Gloucestershire
- Grid reference: SO579088
- Coordinates: 51.776729°N 2.610882°W
- Interest: Biological
- Area: 40.3 ha (100 acres)
- Notification date: 1998

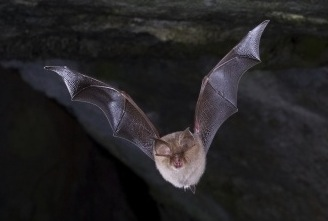
Example - Lesser Horseshoe Bat (Rhinolophus hipposideros)

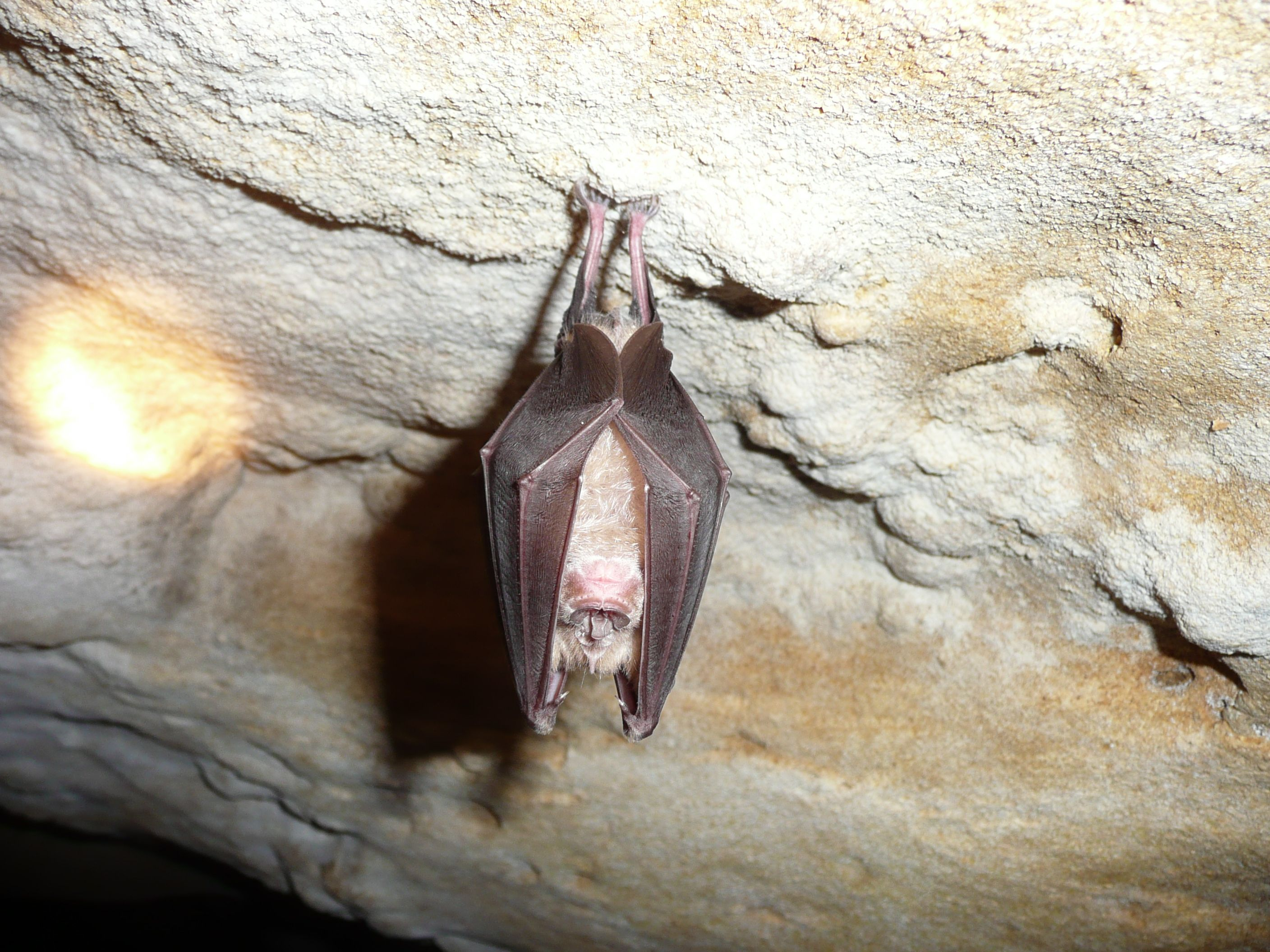
Example - Greater Horseshoe Bat (Rhinolophus ferrumequinum)

Old Bow And Old Ham Mines (grid reference SO579088) is a 40.3-hectare (100-acre) biological Site of Special Scientific Interest in Gloucestershire, notified in 1998.

== Location and habitat ==
The mines comprise one of a series of Sites of Special Scientific Interest within the Forest of Dean and Wye Valley (Gloucestershire and Monmouthshire). These sites support (between them) important breeding and hibernation roosts for lesser and greater horseshoe bats. This is of European importance.

Other sites in the group in Gloucestershire (all of which are SSSIs) include the breeding sites of Blaisdon Hall, Caerwood And Ashberry Goose House, Dean Hall Coach House & Cellar and Sylvan House Barn. Hibernation sites include Buckshraft Mine & Bradley Hill Railway Tunnel, Devil's Chapel Scowles, Westbury Brook Ironstone Mine and Wigpool Ironstone Mine.

A ring of iron-ore bearing Carboniferous Limestone in the Forest of Dean provides the focus of ancient and recent mines. These provide excellent hibernation sites for bats and the Old Bow and Old Ham mines are made up of a far-reaching area of underground workings. These are on the west side of the Forest of Dean and are near Clearwell.

The notified site includes parts of four mine complexes: Clearwell, Old Bow, Lambsquay, and Old Ham. There are interconnections, with entrances at the grilled (and padlocked where necessary) shafts along the edge of the outcrop. The length of the tunnels and workings is estimated to be around 30 kilometres.

The deciduous woodlands and sheltered valleys of the Forest of Dean and the Wye Valley provide a good feeding area. There are three units of assessment, with Unit 2 and Unit 3 serving as woodland shelter areas on the western side.

The citations for the series of sites provide common information.

== Bat Species ==
The site is mostly used by lesser horseshoe bats, but a small number of greater horseshoe bats also use the site. It is recorded as regularly holding over 300 lesser horseshoe bats. Other recorded bat species which use the site for hibernation are Daubenton's bat, Brandt's bat, Natterer's bat, whiskered bat and the long-eared bat.

The Horseshoe bats hibernate in the caves and tunnels in the winter months and move between various parts of the mine complexes in spring and autumn. Thus they are able to locate a suitable microclimate (temperature and humidity). This is a prime site because of the size and depth.

== Clearwell caves ==
Commercial and recreational use continues in part of the Clearwell Cave system. There are 'show' caves with stalactites. Crystal formations of haematite, dolomite and calcite occur. Natural pigments such as ochre are mined by the mineral gale owner along with small quantities of iron ore and rock samples.

== Image gallery ==
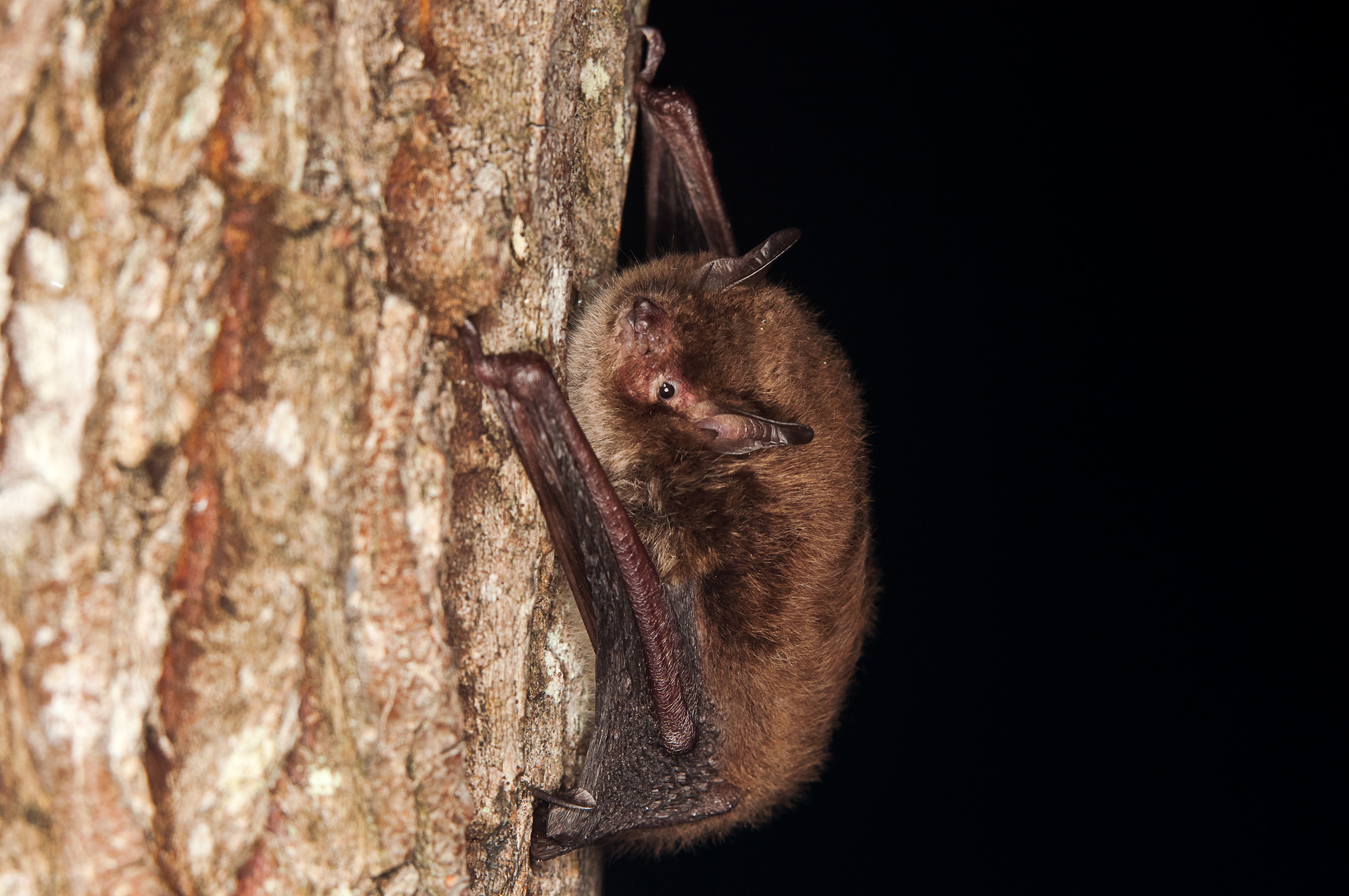
Example - Daubenton's bat (Myotis daubentoni)

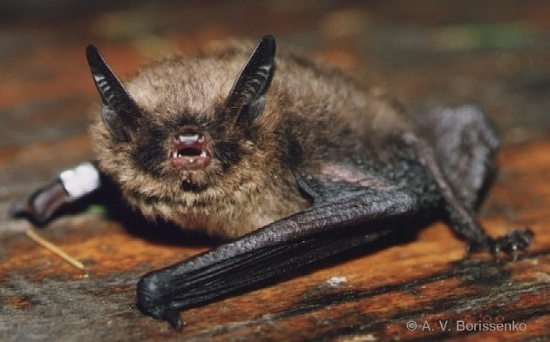
Example - Brandt's bat (Myotis brandtii)

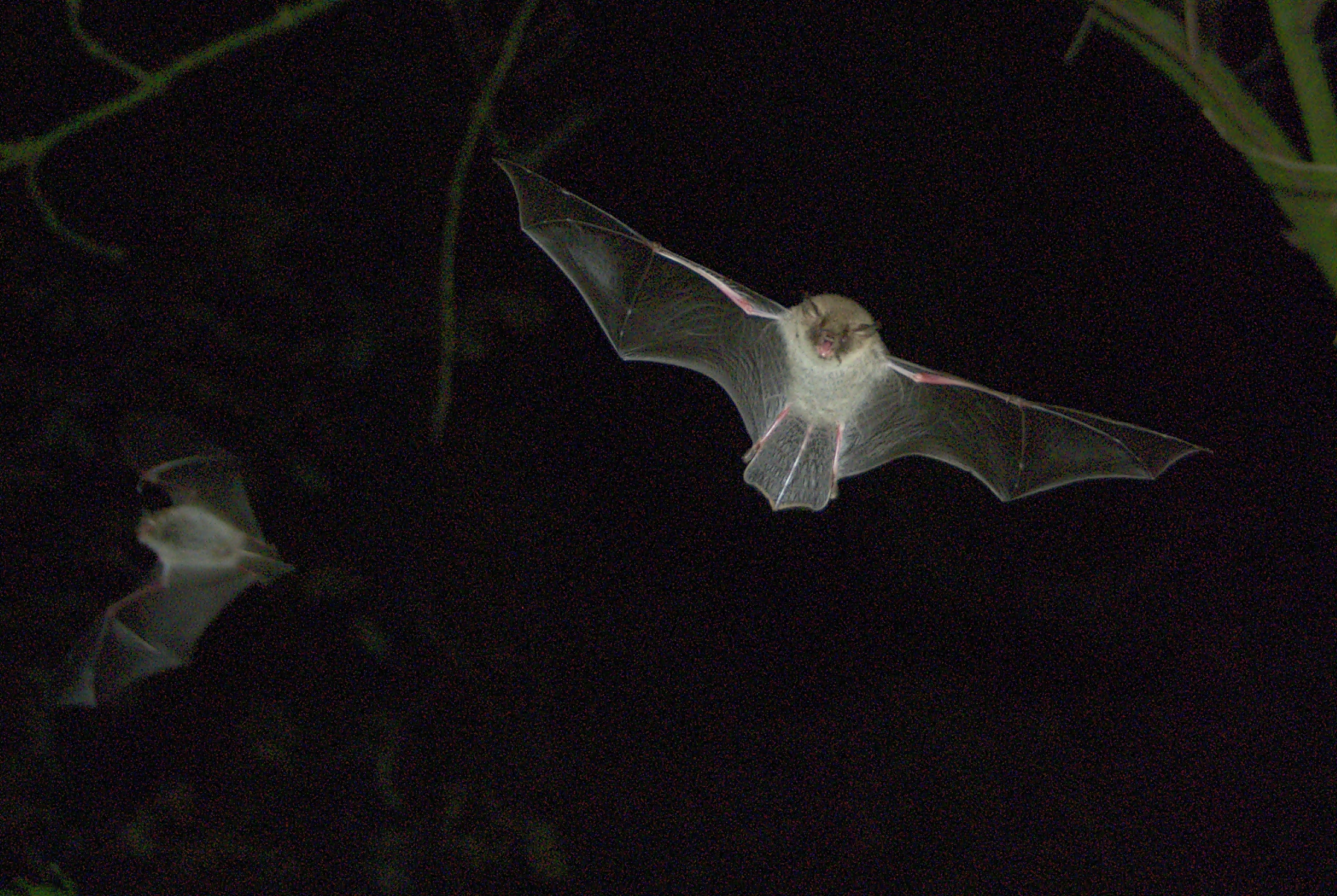
Example - Natterer's bat (Myotis nattereri)

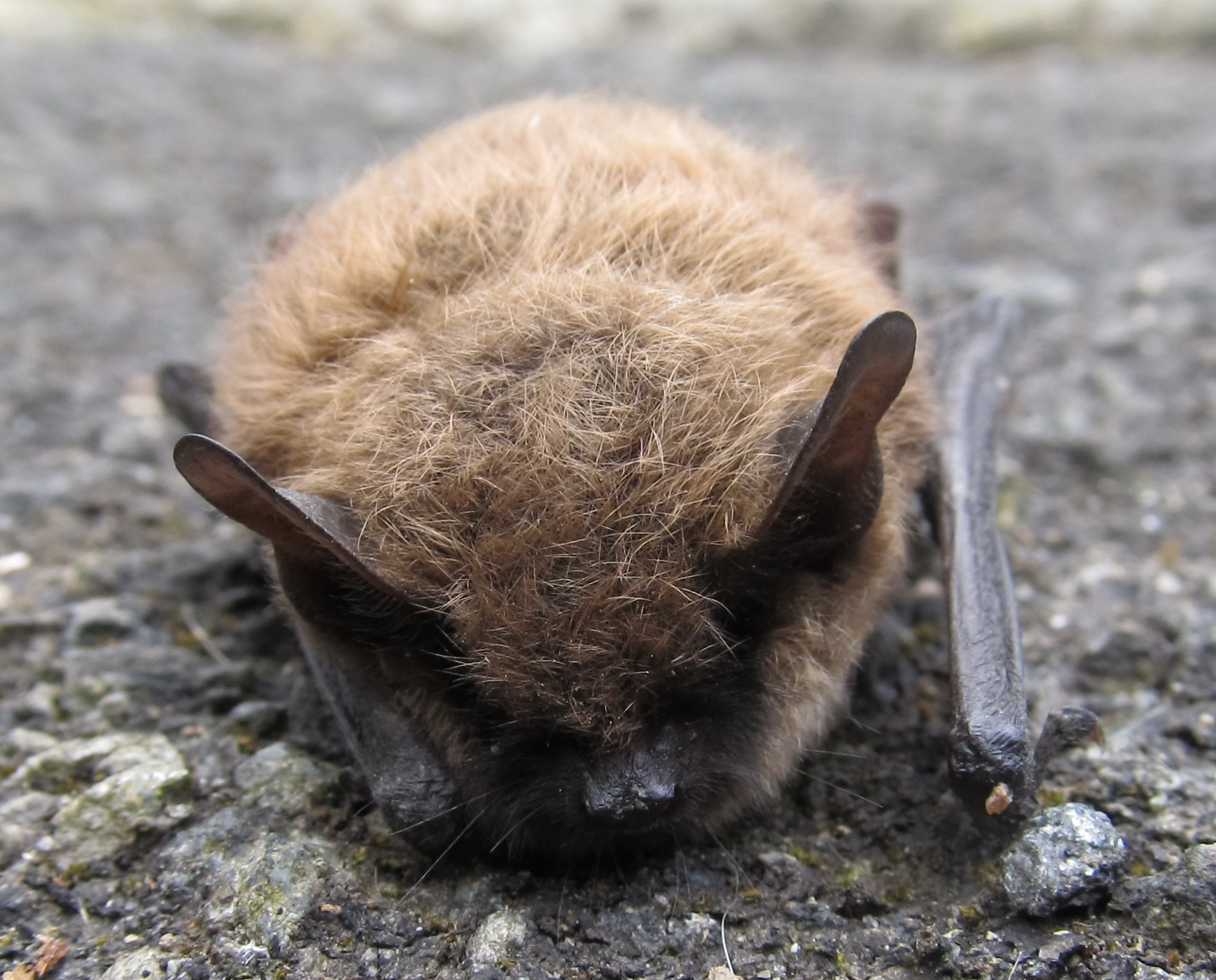
Example - whiskered Bbt (Myotis mystacinus)

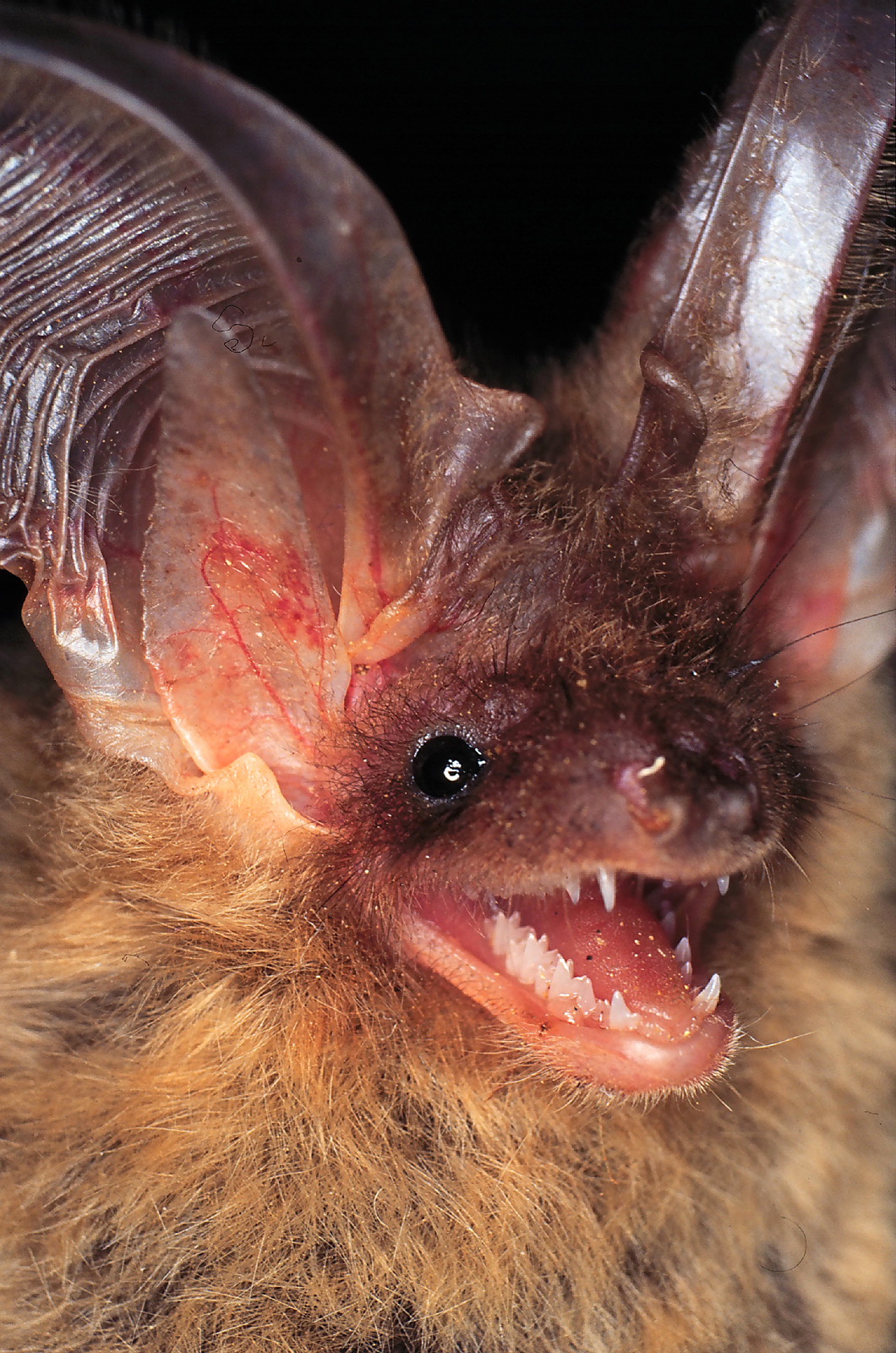
Example - long-eared bat (Plecotus auritus)

== SSSI Source ==
- Natural England SSSI information on the citation
- Natural England SSSI information on the Old Bow And Old Ham Mines units
