= Sylvan House Barn =

Barn in Gloucestershire, England

- Site of Special Scientific Interest
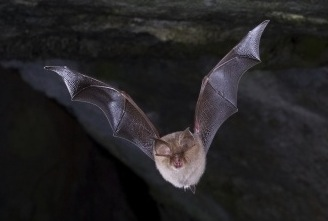
- Example - Lesser Horseshoe Bat (Rhinolophus hipposideros)

- Location within Gloucestershire
- Location of Sylvan House Barn.
- Area of search: Gloucestershire
- Grid reference: SO534023
- Coordinates: 51.717933°N 2.675229°W
- Interest: Biological
- Area: 0.005 ha (0.012 acres)
- Notification date: 1995

Sylvan House Barn (grid reference SO534023) is a 0.005-hectare (0.012-acre) stone built barn near the village of St Briavels, in the Forest of Dean, Gloucestershire. Because of its breeding bats, the site was notified as a biological Site of Special Scientific Interest in 1995.

Sylvan House Barn supports a breeding roost of Lesser horseshoe bats which consists of one fifth of the known Gloucestershire breeding population, and has been deemed by Natural England to be of national importance. The notified site consists of the roofspace of the barn and the roof of an adjacent lean-to, in total an area of 0.005 hectares.

== Location and habitat ==
The Wye Valley and Forest of Dean are one of the main locations for Lesser horseshoe bats because of the deciduous woodlands and, sheltered valleys, which provide a good feeding area, and the underground systems which provide roosting and breeding sites.

The site is one of a series of Sites of Special Scientific Interest within the Forest of Dean and Wye Valley (Gloucestershire and Monmouthshire). These sites support (between them) breeding and hibernation roosts for Lesser and Greater horseshoe bats. This is of European importance. Other sites in the group in Gloucestershire (all of which are SSSIs) include the breeding sites of Blaisdon Hall, Caerwood And Ashberry Goose House and Dean Hall Coach House & Cellar. Hibernation sites include Buckshraft Mine & Bradley Hill Railway Tunnel, Devil's Chapel Scowles, Old Bow And Old Ham Mines and Westbury Brook Ironstone Mine.

The citations for the series of sites provide common information.

Wye Valley and Forest of Dean Bat Sites/ Safleoedd Ystlumod Dyffryn Gwy a Fforest y Ddena are recognised as a Special Area of Conservation (SAC) under the EU Habitats Directive.

== Sources ==
- Natural England SSSI information on citation, map and unit detail

== Audio ==
Lesser horseshoe bat recorded on a heterodyne bat detector set to 107 kHz
