= Plump Hill Dolomite Quarry =

Nature reserve in Gloucestershire, England

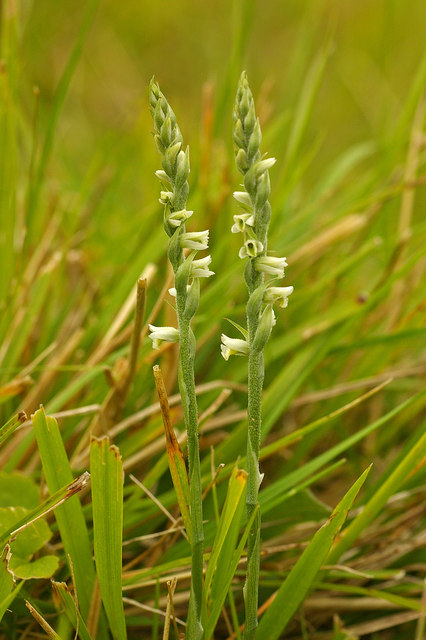
- Example - Autumn Lady's Tresses (Spiranthes spiralis)

- Location within Gloucestershire
- Type: Gloucestershire Wildlife Trust nature reserve
- Location: near Mitcheldean
- Coordinates: 51°51′6.87″N 2°29′34.25″W
- Area: 11.1 acres (4.5 ha)
- Created: 1982
- Operator: Gloucestershire Wildlife Trust
- Status: Open all year

Plump Hill Dolomite Quarry (grid reference SO661171) is a 4.5-hectare (11-acre) nature reserve in Gloucestershire in the Forest of Dean.

The site is managed by the Gloucestershire Wildlife Trust and held under agreement with the Forestry Commission since 1982. In 1987 a rough area to the north of the Quarry, together with a narrow strip on the western edge were incorporated into the reserve. The site is listed in the 'Forest of Dean Local Plan Review' as a Key Wildlife Site (KWS).

== Location and site ==
The quarry is next to the A4136 road, and about one mile south of Mitcheldean. There are several other reserve sites nearby being Edgehills Quarry (a Site of Special Scientific Interest), Merring Meend, Westbury Brook Pond and Fairplay Iron Mine. Plump Hill Dolomite Quarry was operated extensively in the late 19th and early 20th centuries. The workings were used for road metal and kiln lime. This is now a disused quarry and there are three steep rock faces left as a result of the quarrying.

The Lower Dolomite Formation, and a transition to Crease limestone may be seen on the west side. Jointing and weathering features are visible in the Carboniferous limestone. The quarry floor is below the level of the road.

The reserve provides views across the Severn Vale to the Cotswold scarp.

== Flora ==
The quarry floor has been significantly colonised with plants which flourish on limestone grassland. The plant of significant interest is autumn lady's-tresses. The reserve also supports white horehound. Other species recorded include harebell, carline thistle, dwarf thistle, fairy flax and blue fleabane. Wild thyme and large thyme grow in this area.

Grasses include quaking-grass, silver hair-grass, yellow oat-grass and crested dog's-tail. Ferns grow between the rocks such as wall-rue, maidenhair spleenwort and Hart's-tongue.

The shallow quarry workings at the top are covered in bracken and hawthorn. The western side is mostly rough grassland with scrub. On the eastern side there are rowan trees, sycamore and oak.

== Birds and invertebrates ==
The reserve is known for its birdlife and butterflies.

== Conservation ==
Sheep grazing contributes to the maintenance of the grassland to keep it short to encourage wildflowers. Bracken needs additional control.

== Walks ==
There is a publication which details places to visit for recreation, and for observing particular wildlife in this part of the Forest of Dean.

== Publications ==
- Kelham, A, Sanderson, J, Doe, J, Edgeley-Smith, M, et al., 1979, 1990, 2002 editions, 'Nature Reserves of the Gloucestershire Trust for Nature Conservation/Gloucestershire Wildlife Trust'
- ‘Nature Reserve Guide – discover the wild Gloucestershire on your doorstep’ - 50th Anniversary, January 2011, Gloucestershire Wildlife Trust
- 'Where to see Wildlife in the Forest of Dean', January 2012, Gloucestershire Wildlife Trust
