= Littledean =

Coordinates: 51°48′53″N 2°28′38″W

- Village
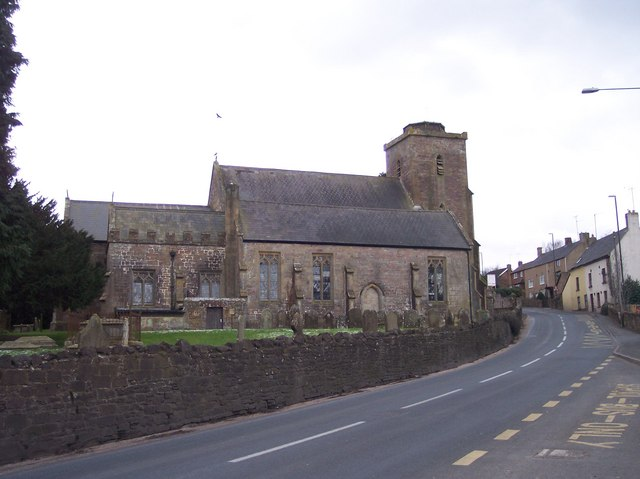
- St Ethelbert’s Church, Littledean

- Location within Gloucestershire
- Population: 1,296 (2011)
- OS grid reference: SO672130
- Civil parish: Littledean
- District: Forest of Dean
- Shire county: Gloucestershire
- Region: South West
- Country: England
- Sovereign state: United Kingdom
- Post town: CINDERFORD
- Postcode district: GL14
- Police: Gloucestershire
- Fire: Gloucestershire
- Ambulance: South Western
- UK Parliament: Forest of Dean

Littledean is a village in the Forest of Dean, west Gloucestershire, England. The village has a long history and formerly had the status of a town. Littledean Hall was originally a Saxon hall, although it has been rebuilt and the current house dates back to 1612. The remains of a Roman temple are situated in the grounds. Neither the hall or Roman remains are open to the public.

Collectively, the villages and the surrounding wood (Forest of Dean) were mentioned in the Domesday Book of 1086 as Dene, and appear as Dena in 1130.

== Governance ==
The village falls in the Littledean and Ruspidge electoral ward. This ward has Littledean in the north plus Ruspidge and Soudley civil parish in the south. The total ward population taken at the 2011 census was 3,768.

== Notable buildings ==
- Littledean Hall, a country house.
- The former prison in Littledean, which is now a crime museum.
- St Ethelbert's Church, whose clockface has IX in both the 9 and 11 positions.
- Littledean Camp, the remains of a Norman Motte-and-bailey castle overlooking the village, previously thought to be a Roman Camp.
