= Bryanston SSSI, Dorset =

Protected area in Dorset, England

Coordinates: 50.86250°N 2.03831°W

Bryanston SSSI (grid reference ST974070) is a 0.3 hectare biological Site of Special Scientific Interest in Dorset, England notified in 1977.

It is used as a roost site by Greater Horseshoe bats.

== Sources ==
- English Nature citation sheet for the site (accessed 29 August 2006)
