= Belle Vue Quarry =

Site of Special Scientific Interest in Dorset

Coordinates: 50.60352°N 1.98158°W

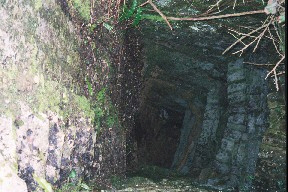
Looking down into the quarry

Belle Vue Quarry (grid reference SZ014782) is a 3.2 hectare biological Site of Special Scientific Interest in Dorset, notified in 1977.

It is used as a roosting site by Greater Horseshoe bats.

== Sources ==
- English Nature citation sheet for the site (accessed 29 August 2006)
