= Littledean Hall =

Country house in Gloucestershire, England

Littledean Hall (grid reference SO672130) is a country house in the village of Littledean, Gloucestershire, England. It has been described as one of the most haunted houses in England and is thought to be the oldest house in the United Kingdom which is still occupied. Saxon and Celtic remains have been uncovered in the cellars. Part of the house is designated an SSSI as it is a proven breeding roost for the Greater Horseshoe Bat (Rhinolophus ferrumequinum).

== Architecture and History ==
Originally a Saxon hall, then a church, it was then converted to a Norman hall, complete with a crypt and undercroft. Testing has shown that these remains date back to the 5th century. However, when records began of the house in 1080, it had evolved into a substantial medieval manor house which was eventually replaced with a Jacobean house in 1612.

The hall has seven bedrooms, a coach house, a dining room, sitting and drawing rooms, a stable, living room and cellar. The sweet chestnuts (Castanea sativa) which line the driveway are at least 500 years old and the remains of a Roman road have been found underneath the drive itself.

The Roman temple site in the outer grounds has the in situ and restored foundation remains of the largest rural Roman temple known in Britain. In 2023 a large grant was awarded to the University of York by The Leverhulme Trust to study the unique corpus of around 200 stone carved heads recovered through archaeological excavations since 2016, referred to in PAST, the Newsletter of The Prehistoric Society as "a corpus unique in the British Isles and unparalleled in Europe".

In 2007 the building suffered damage after lightning struck nearby and in 2008 the owners of the hall were ordered to rebuild a section of wall they had knocked down. The wall was deemed to be a Grade II listed building alongside the main hall.

== Dean Hall Coach House & Cellar SSSI ==
Dean Hall Coach House & Cellar
- Site of Special Scientific Interest
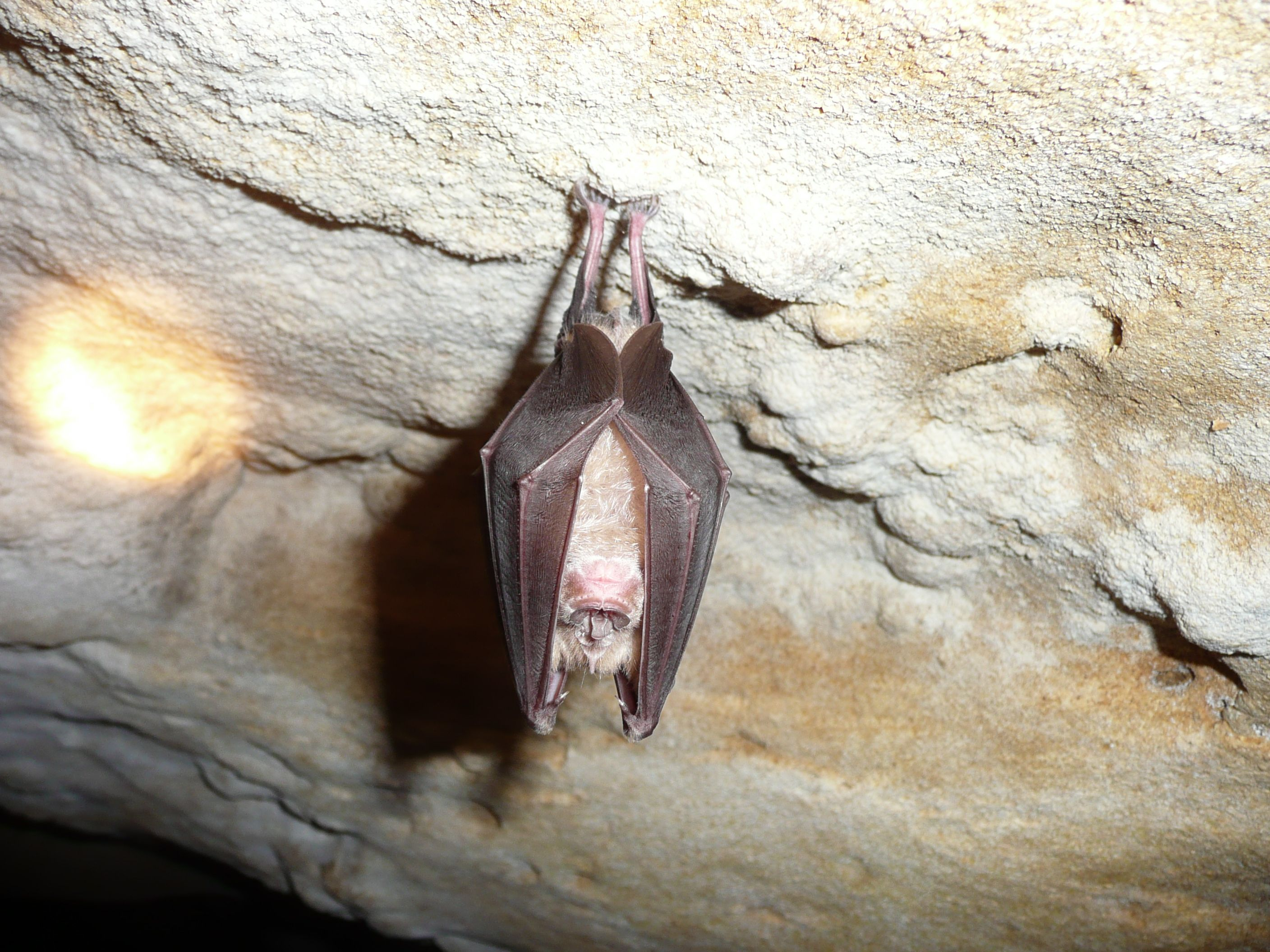
- Example - Greater Horseshoe Bat (Rhinolophus ferrumequinum)

- Location within Gloucestershire
- Location of Dean Hall Coach House & Cellar.
- Area of search: Gloucestershire
- Grid reference: SO672130
- Coordinates: 51.815113°N 2.47649°W
- Interest: Biological
- Area: 0.02 ha (0.049 acres)
- Notification date: 1988

Dean Hall Coach House & Cellar (grid reference SO672130) is a 0.02-hectare (0.049-acre) biological Site of Special Scientific Interest in Gloucestershire, notified in 1988. The site is listed in the 'Forest of Dean Local Plan Review' as a Key Wildlife Site (KWS).

The hall (coach house and cellar) is currently home to Greater horseshoe bats which makes it a Site of Special Scientific Interest which is closely monitored by Natural England. It is a significant breeding roost and its use has been recorded since 1986. Local reports indicated that bats may have used the building for over 75 years.

=== Location and habitat ===
The site is one of a series of Sites of Special Scientific Interest within the Forest of Dean and Wye Valley (Gloucestershire and Monmouthshire). These sites support (between them) breeding and hibernation roosts for Lesser and Greater horseshoe bats. This is of European importance. Other sites in the group in Gloucestershire (all of which are SSSIs) include the breeding sites of Blaisdon Hall, Caerwood And Ashberry Goose House, and Sylvan House Barn. Hibernation sites include Buckshraft Mine & Bradley Hill Railway Tunnel, Devil's Chapel Scowles, Old Bow And Old Ham Mines and Westbury Brook Ironstone Mine.

The deciduous woodlands and sheltered valleys of the Forest of Dean and the Wye Valley provide a good feeding area, and the underground systems provide roosting and breeding sites. A ring of iron-ore bearing Carboniferous Limestone in the Forest of Dean has created a series of ancient and more recent mines which provide hibernation sites. The citations for the series of sites provide common information.

Wye Valley and Forest of Dean Bat Sites/ Safleoedd Ystlumod Dyffryn Gwy a Fforest y Ddena are recognised as a Special Area of Conservation (SAC) under the EU Habitats Directive.
