= Littledean Camp =

Coordinates: 51°49′09″N 2°28′13″W

Littledean Camp is in fact a castle overlooking the village of Littledean in Gloucestershire, England, notable for its unique early Norman design.

Originally known as "Littledean Roman Camp" or just "Roman Camp" whilst once thought to have had Roman origins (as reflected in older Ordnance Survey maps), 20th century archaeology has shown that the castle was built in the 11th century following the Norman invasion of 1066. The castle was positioned on high ground overlooking the Severn valley and the town of Littledean. In addition to protecting the local villages, the castle was probably intended to operate with the castles at Glasshouse Woods and Howle Hill Camp as a screen to protect the city of Gloucester from military threats from Wales.

Today, only the outer wall earthworks remain and be clearly seen. Trees are growing throughout the remains of the Castle, and due to its listing as a scheduled monument, the site is not maintained. However, the collection of trees that cover the earthworks stand out from the surrounding fields, allowing this hilltop site (elevation ~600m) to be clearly seen from many miles away.

The castle itself is circular and relatively small, some 60 ft in diameter, with an inner and an outer bailey, the latter protected by a very tall vallum wall. The outer wall has surviving earthworks 12 ft high; originally it would have been 15 ft tall. Uniquely for a castle of this period the outer wall has a motte integrated into the design, rather than located at the centre of the castle; this was probably designed to act as a combination of look-out tower and keep. The entrance to the castle was from the south.

Littledean castle was not occupied for long and by the time of the Anarchy in the middle of the 12th century had already been abandoned for several years, being referred to as the "Old Castle of Dean".

== See also ==
- Castles in Great Britain and Ireland
- List of castles in England

== Bibliography ==
- Scott-Garrett, C. Littledean Camp, in Transactions of the Bristol and Gloucestershire Archaeological Society, 1958, Vol. 77.
