= Puzzlewood =

Ancient woodland in Gloucestershire, England

Coordinates: 51.780°N 2.615°W

Puzzlewood in Gloucestershire

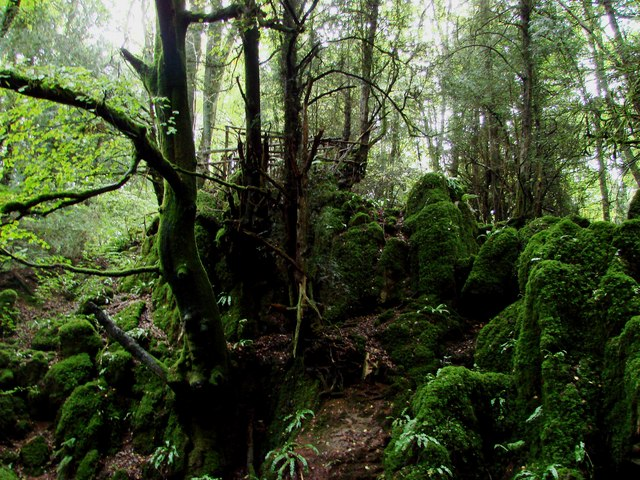
Part of Puzzlewood showing a typical scene of tree roots, rocks and moss

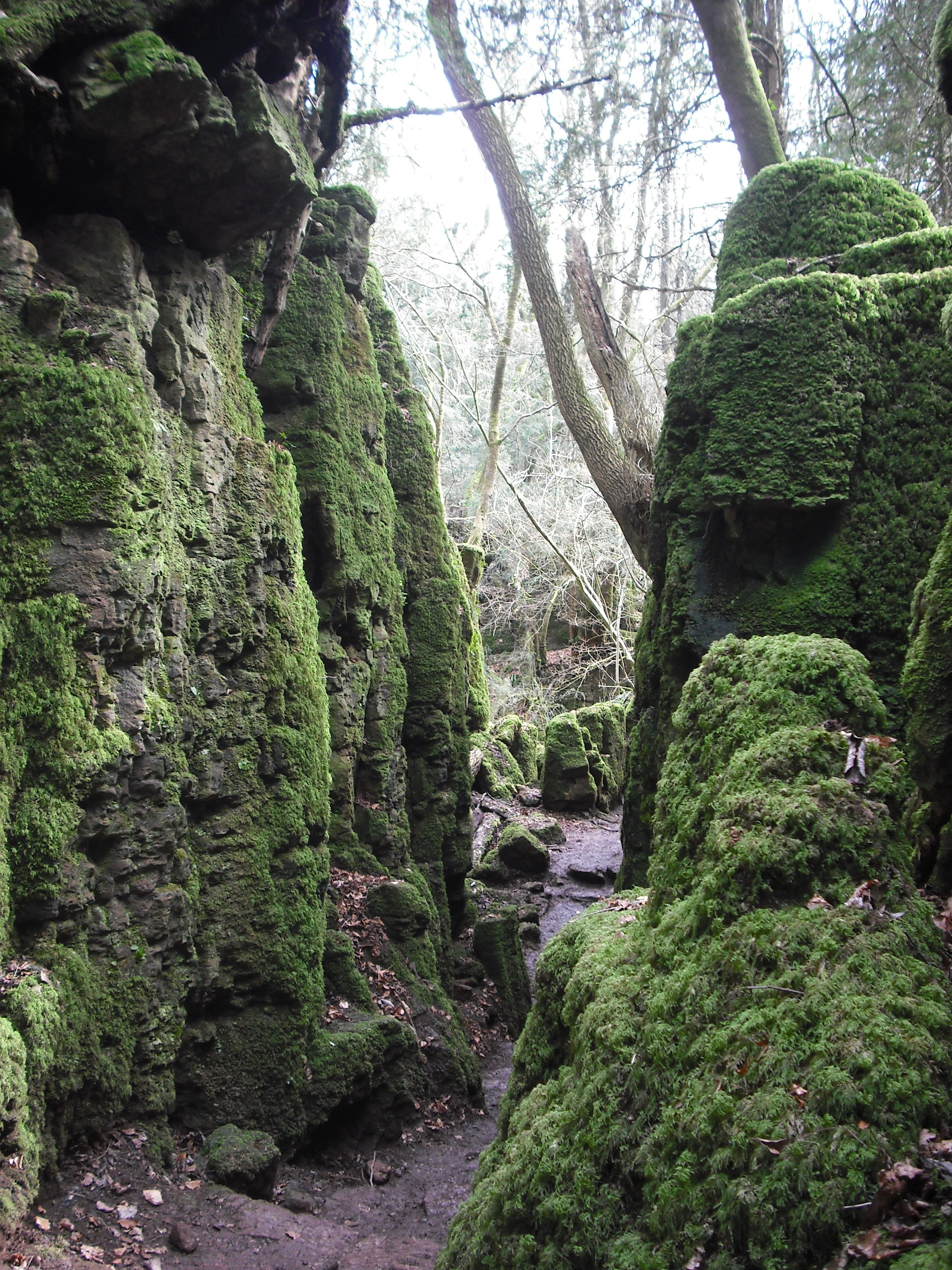

Puzzlewood (grid reference SO578092) is an ancient woodland site and tourist attraction, near Coleford in the Forest of Dean, Gloucestershire, England. The site, covering 14 acres (5.7 ha), shows evidence of open-cast iron ore mining dating from the Roman period, and possibly earlier.

Over a mile of pathways were laid down in the early 19th century to provide access to the woods, and provide picturesque walks. The area contains strange rock formations, secret caves and ancient trees, with a confusing maze of paths.

The site is listed as a regionally important geological site in the 'Forest of Dean Local Plan Review'.

== Geology ==
The geological features on show at Puzzlewood are known as scowles. Scowles originated through the erosion of natural cave systems formed in the Carboniferous Limestone many millions of years ago. Uplift and erosion caused the cave system to become exposed at the surface. This was then exploited by Iron Age settlers through to Roman times for the extraction of iron ore. It is usually impossible to date open-cast extraction precisely, although ores with a chemical signature consistent with those from the Forest of Dean were certainly used to make tools and weapons in the late prehistoric period.

== Roman coins ==
More than 3,000 Roman-era coins were found by workers in 1848. The coins were stored in three earthenware jars in a cavity in the rock formations. The origin of the coins is unknown.

== Literary influences ==
Harry Potter author J. K. Rowling has also visited Puzzlewood. The Forbidden Forest within the series bears some similarities to the geography of the area. Additionally, the forest is believed to have been an inspiration for J. R. R. Tolkien's The Lord of the Rings.

== Filming location ==
Puzzlewood has been used as a filming location for both film and television in recent years. Notable examples include:

Films

- Jack the Giant Slayer (2013)
- Star Wars: The Force Awakens (2015)
- The Huntsman: Winter's War (2016)
- A Midsummer Night's Dream (2016)
- The Secret Garden (2020)

Television

- Doctor Who (2005-present) (Flesh and Stone)
- Merlin (2008-2012)
- Wizards vs Aliens (2012-2014)
- Tree Fu Tom (2012-2016)
- Atlantis (2013-2015)
- Da Vinci's Demons (2013-2015)
- Hidden Kingdoms (2014)
- The Dark Crystal: Age of Resistance (2019)
- Cursed (2020)
