= Edgehills Quarry =

Site of Special Scientific Interest in Gloucestershire

- Site of Special Scientific Interest
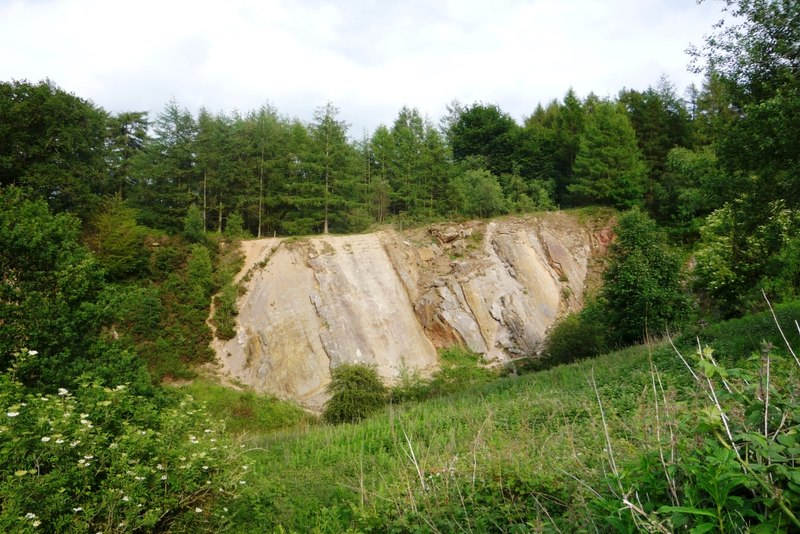
- Edgehills Quarry

- Location within Gloucestershire
- Location of Edgehills Quarry.
- Area of search: Gloucestershire
- Grid reference: SO660167
- Coordinates: 51.848306°N 2.494261°W
- Interest: Geological
- Area: 0.4 ha (0.99 acres)
- Notification date: 1974

Edgehills Quarry (grid reference SO660167) is a 0.4-hectare (0.99-acre) geological Site of Special Scientific Interest in Gloucestershire, notified in 1974.

The site is listed in the 'Forest of Dean Local Plan Review' as a Key Wildlife Site (KWS).

== Location and geology ==
The quarry is sited in the Forest of Dean and provides an easily accessible exposure through c.75 metres of Drybrook Sandstone. The sandstones include good sedimentary structures and fossil traces which indicate a shallow marine environment. The Drybrook Sandstone lies between the Chadian Whitehead Limestone and the overlying unconformable Coal Measures.

The Quarry is near other similar sites and nature reserves being Merring Meend, Westbury Brook Pond, Fairplay Iron Mine and Plump Hill Dolomite Quarry.

== SSSI Source ==
- Natural England SSSI information on the citation
- Natural England SSSI information on the Edgehills Quarry unit
