= Scowle =

Type of landscape feature

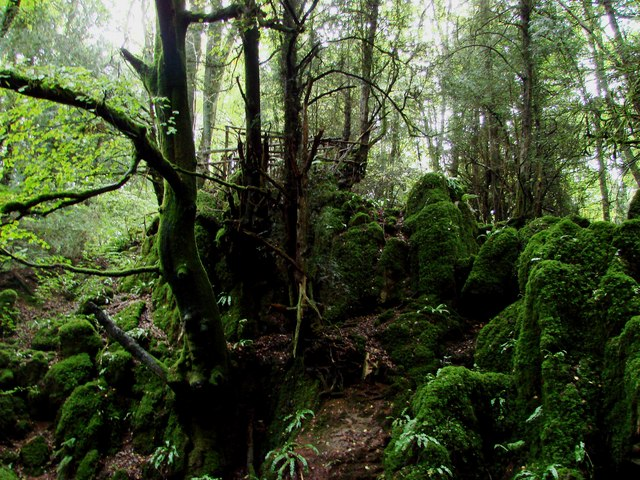
Part of Puzzlewood, near Coleford, showing scowles overgrown by trees and moss

Scowles are landscape features that range from amorphous shallow pits to irregular labyrinthine hollows up to several metres deep and are possibly unique to the Forest of Dean in Gloucestershire, England.

They have traditionally been interpreted as the remains of prehistoric and early historic open-cast iron ore extraction, but investigation undertaken by the Forest of Dean Archaeological Survey from 2003 to 2004 suggests that they have a primarily natural origin, which has been exploited by humans.

== Origin ==
Scowles have developed over millions of years. They occur in a broken ring around the central part of the Forest of Dean and are confined to particular geological outcrops of Carboniferous limestone and sandstone. Ancient cave systems were formed underground, before iron-rich water from the coal measures of the central Forest area permeated from the surface and deposited iron ore in crevices. The caves were then uplifted, eroded and exposed as a surface of deep hollows and exposed rock.

Much later, humans – certainly from the Iron Age and later in the Roman period – recognised that iron ore could be found in veins and pockets in the exposed rock faces. In some places, when the surface exposures were exhausted they followed veins of iron ore underground. The ore was then smelted locally, using locally obtained charcoal, and made into objects or traded, by way of the River Wye or ports on the River Severn and its estuary. However, there is little direct evidence for dating the exploitation of iron ore from scowles.

The most likely origin of the word "scowle" is that it derives from a Brythonic word crowll meaning a cave or hollow, or the Welsh word ysgil meaning a recess. Welsh was the main language in the area before about the 9th century.

== Characteristics ==
Types of scowle range from deep irregular quarry-like features to amorphous shallow hollows. Shallow depressions could be either scowles which have been backfilled, or could represent subsidence of the ground surface above old mines or natural caves. Small pits with mounds of spoil associated with them probably represent different types of iron ore extraction in the vicinity of the exposed cave system, or people prospecting for iron ore away from the main deposits. Small circular pits without associated mounds might represent natural geological features.

Ecologically, scowles are now recognised as important wildlife habitats, being home to lower plants and ferns, bats and invertebrates. However, some are threatened by illegal dumping and off-road vehicles.

The Devil's Chapel Scowles near Bream are a Site of Special Scientific Interest.

== Tourism and popular culture ==
One of the most accessible areas of scowles is at Puzzlewood near Coleford, which is open as a tourist attraction. Over a mile of pathways were laid down in the early 19th century to provide access to the woods, and provide picturesque walks. Puzzlewood, and "Dwarf's Hill" at Lydney Park which also contains scowles, are said to have been inspirations for J. R. R. Tolkien's descriptions of Middle-earth forests in The Lord of the Rings. Tolkien carried out archaeological work in the area in the 1920s with Mortimer Wheeler.

== Publications ==
- Scowles in the Forest of Dean – their formation, history and wildlife, (undated), Gloucestershire Wildlife Trust, Gloucestershire County Council Archaeology Service, Gloucestershire Geoconservation Trust, English Heritage and English Nature (now Natural England) joint publication
