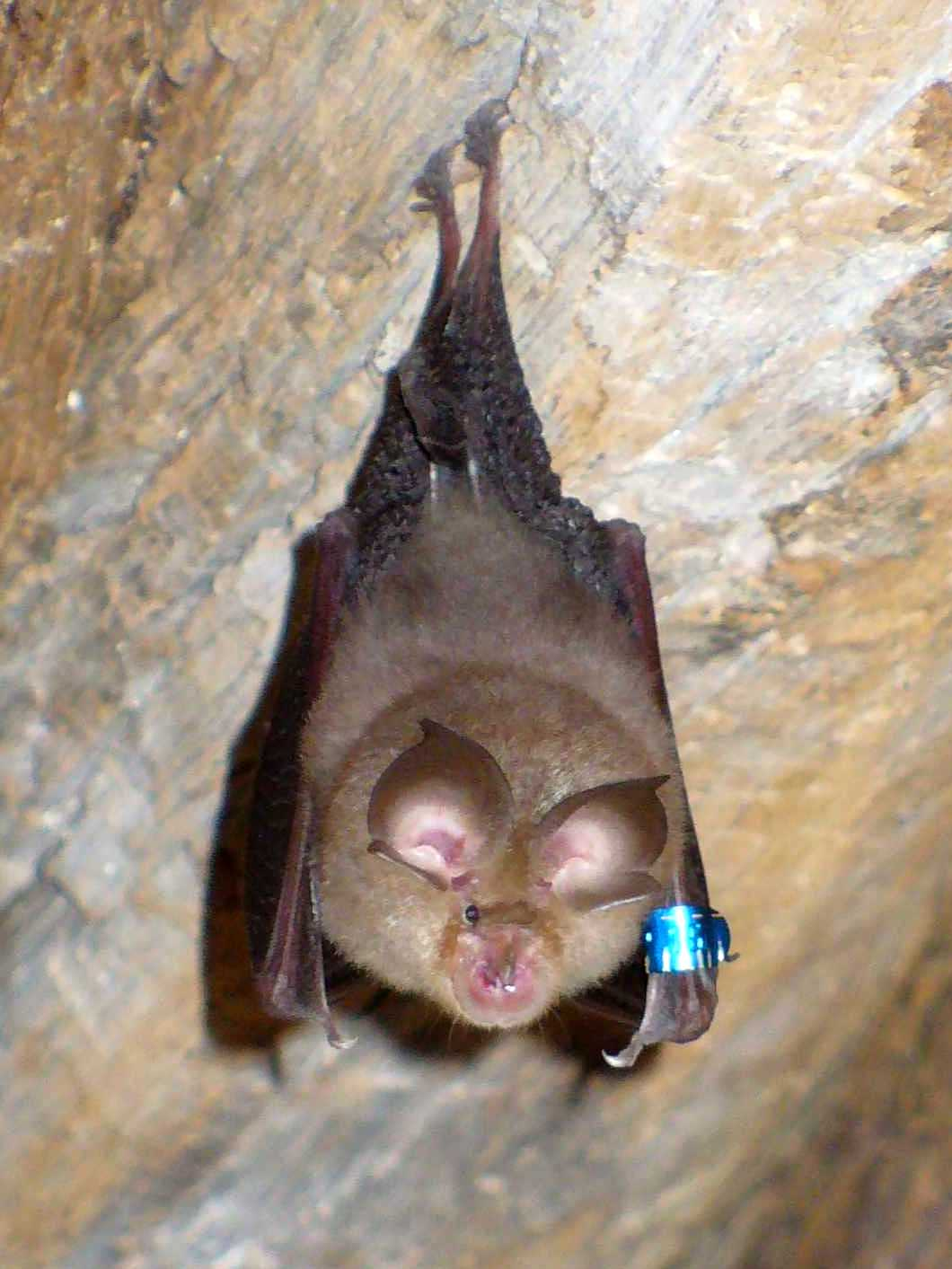
- In France

Conservation status
- Least Concern (IUCN 3.1)

Scientific classification
- Kingdom: Animalia
- Phylum: Chordata
- Class: Mammalia
- Order: Chiroptera
- Family: Rhinolophidae
- Genus: Rhinolophus
- Species: R. hipposideros

Binomial name
- Rhinolophus hipposideros (Bechstein, 1800)
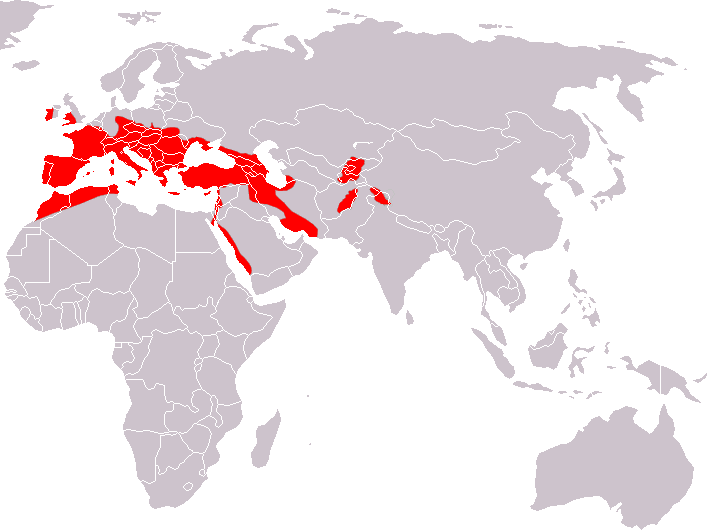
- Lesser horseshoe bat range

= Lesser horseshoe bat =

Species of bat

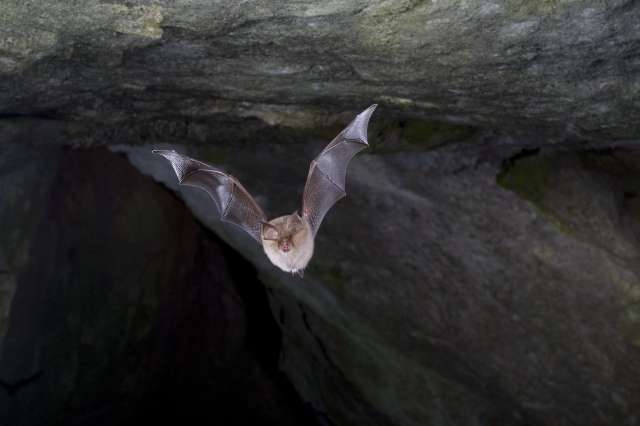
Lesser horseshoe bat in flight

The lesser horseshoe bat (Rhinolophus hipposideros) is a type of small European and North African insectivorous bat, related to its larger cousin, the greater horseshoe bat. As with all horseshoe bats, the species gets its name from its distinctive horseshoe-shaped noseleaf.

== Physical description ==
The lesser horseshoe bat is one of the world's smallest bats, weighing only 5 to 9 grams (0.18 to 0.32 oz), with a wingspan of 192–254 millimetres (7.6–10.0 in) and a body length of 35–45 millimetres (1.4–1.8 in). It has strong feet that it uses to grasp rocks and branches, and can see well in spite of its small eyes. Like most bats, lesser horseshoe bats live in colonies and hunt their prey by echolocation, emitting ultrasound from specialized round pads in their mouth.

The base of its fur, which is soft and fluffy, is light grey in colour, with dorsal side fur smoky brown and the ventral side grey, with the exception of juvenile bats which are entirely dark grey. Ears and wing membranes are a light greyish brown.

When hunting they are quick and agile, often flying within five metres of the ground while avoiding contact with bushes and shrubs. The lesser horseshoe bat eats small insects, most of which are gleaned from stones and branches. Their favorite types of prey include flies, mosquitoes, butterflies, moths, and spiders. The average lifespan of Rhinolophus hipposideros is 3 years, although some individuals have been known to live far longer.

Detailed observations done in Tunisia showed no obvious morphological differences between North African and European specimens.

== Mating ==
Lesser horseshoe bats mate in the autumn. Females give birth to one pup, normally between mid-June and the beginning of July. Pups weigh around 1.8 grams at birth, opening their eyes after around 10 days and becoming independent at six to seven weeks of age. The bats hibernate during the winter months in dark caves, mines, old buildings, and sometimes in cellars.

Females become sexually mature within their first year, with a study in Czechoslovakia showing that about 15% of females give birth at one year of age. Animals have been seen to chase each other as a preliminary to mating, which is done with the male hanging himself behind and over the female.

Maternity colonies (also known as nursery colonies or nursery roosts) are often shared with other species, such as the greater mouse-eared bat, but there is no direct mixing with other species. The move to maternity colonies occurs from April onwards, and the colony size can greatly vary from very few individuals to hundreds of them. Approximately two-thirds of females in a nursery roost give birth between mid-June and mid-July.

== Habitat ==
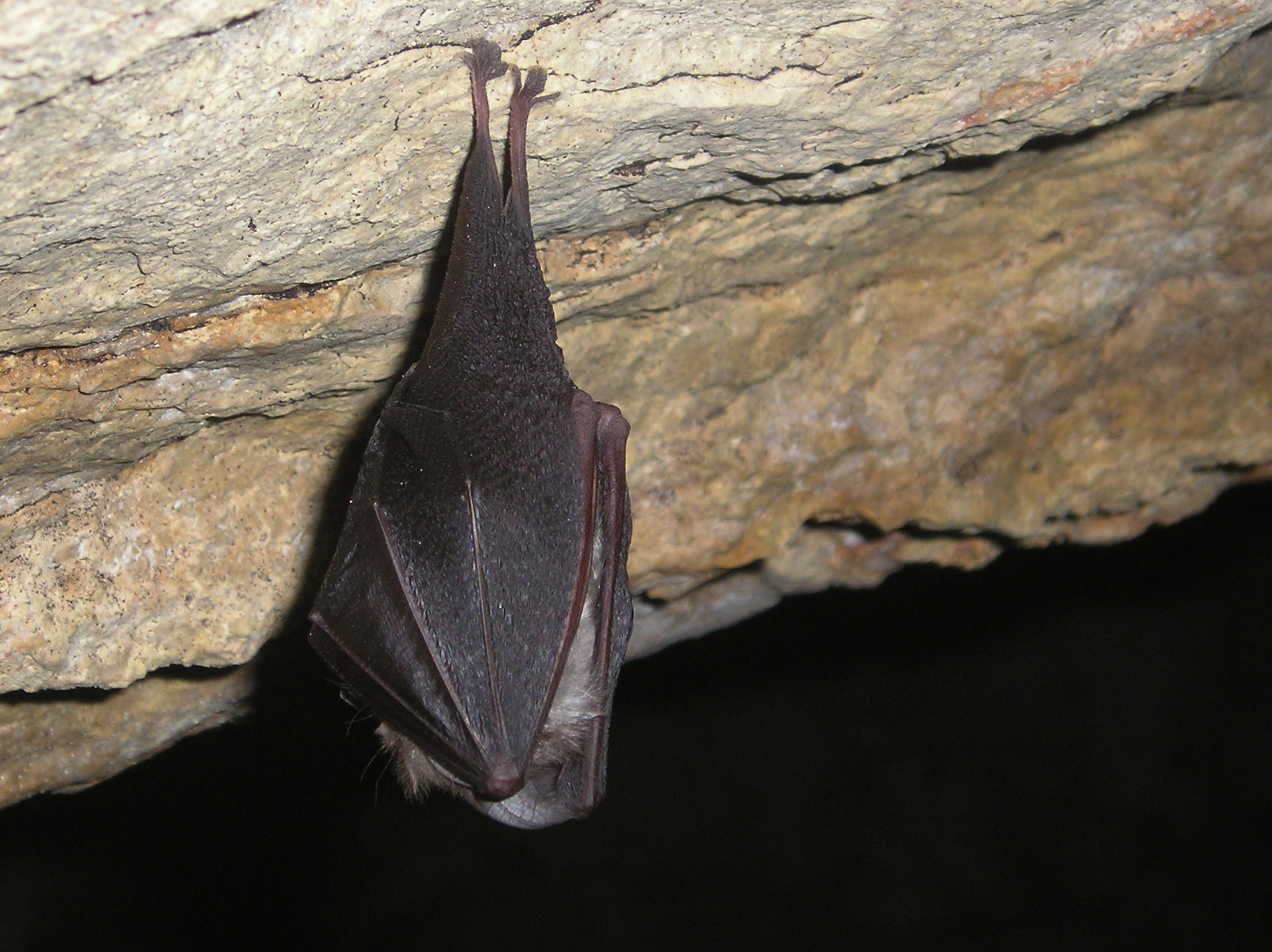
Lesser horseshoe bat in cave during winter.

The lesser horseshoe bat lives in warmer regions in foothills and highland, in particular wooded areas or areas of limestone, where it roosts in caves. In summer its range has been recorded up to 1160 m above sea level, and up to 2000 m in the winter, with the highest known nursery roost at 950 m. The species is sedentary, with the average movement between summer and winter roosts between 5 and 10 kilometers, although the longest recorded distance is 153 kilometers.

== Distribution ==
The species can be found in western Ireland and south-west Britain, with some larger populations in parts of Germany and the Bavarian foothills of the Alps. Rhinolophus hipposideros is widely distributed in the Mediterranean area, occurring in North Africa and on most larger islands to Asia Minor and around the Black Sea. In Asia, it can be found in Kashmir, the Near East, Iran, Iraq and the Arabian Peninsula, as well as part of East Africa.

=== United Kingdom ===
Conservation of the Lesser horseshoe bat in the Wye Valley and the Forest of Dean; a short video by NRW.

The UK distribution of the lesser horseshoe bat can be found on the National Biodiversity Network website here, but they are mostly found in Wales and the Southwest of England.

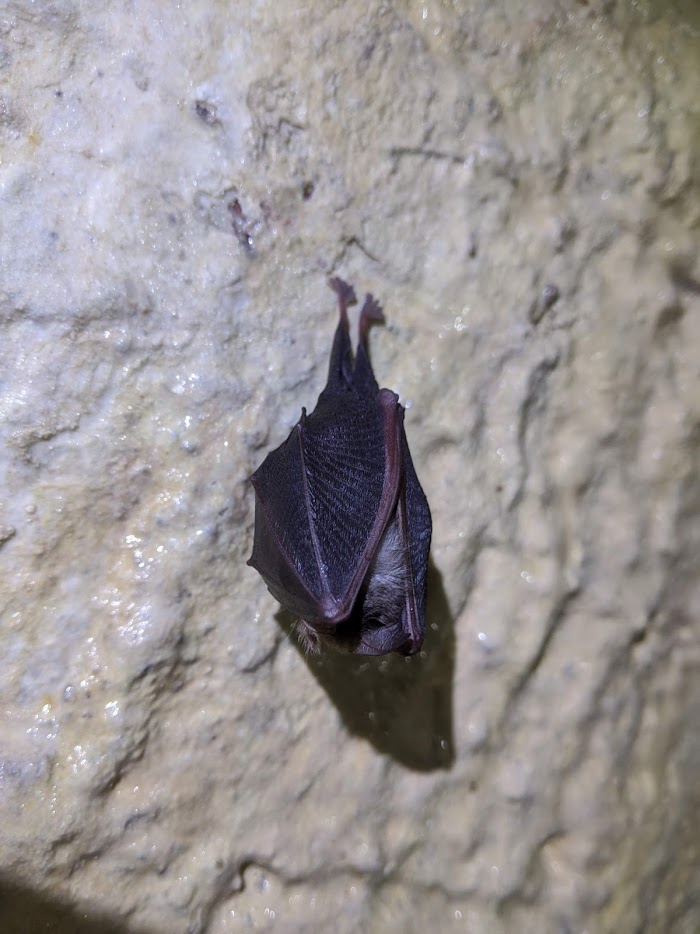
A torpid lesser horseshoe bat, Gloucestershire, UK

A large breeding colony of lesser horseshoe bats populates the smallest SSSI (Site of Special Scientific Interest) in the UK, a 7m^{2} barn in Gloucestershire, England. The species is threatened by a number of factors, including the disturbance or destruction of roosts, changes in agricultural practices (such as the increased use of insecticides, which reduce prey availability) and the loss of suitable foraging habitats. However, the Bat Conservation Trust's Hibernation Survey shows numbers in the UK are increasing significantly – by an average of 4.5% yearly between 1999 and 2012, a 77.2% total increase during that period.

=== Ireland ===
The lesser horseshoe bat has been recorded in the counties Galway, South Mayo, Clare, Limerick, Cork and Kerry. The population is estimated at 13,000.

=== Israel ===
The lesser horseshoe bat is rare in Israel.

=== Balearic Islands ===
In the Balearic Islands, Rhinolophus hipposideros lives on all three of the main islands: Mallorca, Menorca and Ibiza, as well as the smaller islands Cabrera and Formentera. Roosts containing up to 50 individuals have been found in caves such as the Cova de Ca Na Rea (Ibiza), though most groups tend to be smaller. In the Balearics, the lesser horseshoe bat travels only short distances, usually around 2 km, and is also the most common bat species on Ibiza.

=== Tunisia ===
In Tunisia, the lesser horseshoe bat, though rarer than other bat species, is present in the humid climatic zone (i.e. the most northern part of the country). It had been mostly reported as isolated individuals or small groups of hibernating bats until 2011. Then, a maternity colony was found in the abandoned Hôtel des Chênes, South of Ain Draham. The presence of this first known maternity colony in the country surprised the investigators: the bats roosted under the roof and in the various rooms instead of trees or abandoned mines: It might therefore be of interest to search for maternity colonies of the species in North Africa, not only in wooded areas and underground sites but also in abandoned opened buildings.

== Echolocation ==
Ultrasonic calls of the lesser horseshoe bat. These calls are characterized by a very high main frequency (approx. 110 kHz); the call duration is about 30 ms. A version of the recording slowed down 20 times can be heard here:

The frequencies used by this bat species for echolocation lie between 93 and 111 kHz, have most energy at 110 kHz and have an average duration of 31.7 ms. Due to the frequency of their echolocation calls there are overlaps with those of the Mediterranean horseshoe bat and Mehely's horseshoe bat.

== Conservation ==
This species is protected in the European Union under the Habitats Directive. This species is also listed in the Berne Convention and is specifically targeted by the UNEP-EUROBATS convention. Several national legislation are also protecting this species and its habitats in many countries and regions.

In order to highlight the importance of protecting this species at the European scale, this species was selected as bat species of the Year 2018–2019 by the pan-European NGO BatLife Europe.
