= List of caves in Tennessee =

The US state of Tennessee has the most known caves of any US state, and is estimated to have around twenty percent of all caves in America. The state has rich deposits of limestone, the primary rock type that forms caves.

== List of caves ==
Cave	Image	County	Length	Year discovered	Notes
Appalachian Caverns		Sullivan County		675 AD	Originally used as a shelter for Early Woodland natives around the year 675 AD. It was originally named Linville Cavern after settler John Linville, who was killed by a native and buried by his brother Jim in the cave. It was later used as a Confederate hospital in the Civil War and then a garbage dump. In 1988, the cave was cleaned and opened in 1991 as Appalachian Caverns (to avoid confusion with Linville Caverns in North Carolina).
Bell Witch Cave		Robertson County	490 feet (150 m)	Early 1800s	On the property of John Bell's estate, known for folk tales about the Bell Witch.
Blue Spring Cave		White County	41.93 miles (67.48 km)	1800s (original section), 1989 (new sections)	2nd longest cave in Tennessee, 10th longest cave in the US, and 44th longest cave in the world.
Big Bone Cave		Van Buren County	9.627 miles (15.493 km)	c. 1810	Home to a large saltpeter mine; was named after the copious amounts of bones buried in the dirt, notably from Megalonyx.
Bristol Caverns		Sullivan County	0.5 miles (0.80 km)	1863 (rediscovered)	Originally known as Bishop's Cave. Opened to the public in 1944 for guided tours where it was renamed to Bristol Caverns.
Bunkum Cave		Pickett County	1 mile (1.6 km)	1800s	In Cordell Hull Birthplace State Park. Father of Cordell Hull, William Hull, used the cave as the site of a moonshine still.
Camps Gulf Cave		Van Buren County	6.9 miles (11.1 km)	1800s	Named after the Camps Gulf area it resides in. A large cave located in Fall Creek Falls State Park that contains 4 very large chambers.
Cherokee Caverns		Knox County	0.28 miles (0.45 km)	1854	Discovered by Robert Crudgington in 1854. His daughter Margaret opened the cave in 1929 as Gentrys Cave, renamed Grand Caverns in 1930. The name changed much over the years, until Cherokee Caverns was decided upon. Currently open only during special events.
Craighead Caverns		McMinn County	0.75 miles (1.21 km)	c. 1820	Home to the Lost Sea, the largest underground lake in the United States and second largest in the world.
Cumberland Caverns		Warren County	27.7 miles (44.6 km)	1810	Discovered in 1810 by Aaron Higginbotham, then Higginbotham Cave became a local natural attraction for recreation, both for locals and foreigners. 3 NSS cavers connected Higginbotham Cave to nearby Henshaw Cave through a small crack on April 4, 1953, and Cumberland Caverns was opened on July 4, 1956. In 2008 it became the site for Bluegrass Underground, which became a PBS show in 2011. It moved to The Caverns in 2018.
Devilstep Hollow Cave		Bledsoe County	360 feet (110 m)	920 AD	Located near the head of the Sequatchie River.
Dunbar Cave State Park		Montgomery County	8.067 miles (12.983 km)	14th century	Most well known for their vast array of prehistoric Mississippian indigenous art.
Forbidden Caverns		Sevier County	0.69 miles (1.11 km)	c. 1920 (white settlers)	This cave was reportedly known to the Cherokee, who would spend the winter deep in the cave. It housed a still run by moonshiners from the 1920s until 1947, when local authorities destroyed it. The cave was opened in 1967 for guided tours, and an artificial entrance was excavated for easy access.
Hubbard's Cave		Warren County		1810	Largest gray bat hibernaculum in Tennessee. Named after discoverer and local settler Joseph Heberlein, whose name was corrupted to "Hubbard."
Jackson Cave		Wilson County	1,000 feet (300 m)	1800s	Was once used as the site of a distillery and later water for Cedars of Lebanon State Park. The cave's entrance is 30 feet (9.1 m) wide and 4 feet (1.2 m) high, and the cave corridor has an average width of 12 feet (3.7 m) and an average height of 6 feet (1.8 m). The cave extends approximately 1,000 feet (300 m) from its entrance to a large pool of water.
Lookout Mountain Caverns	Gfp-tennessee-lookout-mountain-cave-structures	Hamilton County	2.481 miles (3.993 km)	1823	No longer accessible since 2005. Connected to Ruby Falls.
Lost Creek Cave		White County	7 miles (11 km)	1800s	Entrance across from Lost Creek Falls in Scott's Gulf Wilderness State Park. Lost Creek Cave has five entrances, contains a waterfall and 7 miles (11.3 km) of passageways. Part of Lost Creek State Natural Area, once administered by Fall Creek Falls State Park. Once known as White's Cave, then Dodson Cave.
Lost Cove Cave		Franklin County	2 miles (3.2 km)		Also known as the Buggytop Cave.
Nickajack Cave		Marion County	1 mile (1.6 km)	1800	Famed singer Johnny Cash once attempted suicide here following years of drug abuse, but survived following a spiritual experience.
Raccoon Mountain Caverns		Hamilton County	5.5 miles (8.9 km)	1853	Only place in the world where Nesticus furtivus (also known as the Crystal Caverns Cave Spider) is found.
Ruby Falls		Hamilton County	700 feet (210 m)	1928	Contains tallest and deepest subterranean waterfall open to the public in the United States at 145 feet (44 m) tall. Connected to Lookout Mountain Caverns. Accidentally discovered by developer Leo Lambert, who was building an elevator shaft to Lookout Mountain Caverns. Named after his wife Ruby Lambert.
Rumbling Falls Cave		Van Buren County	16.09 miles (25.89 km)	1998	Has the second-largest cave chamber in the United States. Found in Fall Creek Falls State Park.
Snail Shell Cave		Rutherford County	9 miles (14 km)	1951	Part of a larger cave network 13 miles (21 km) in length.
Tuckaleechee Caverns		Blount County	1.55 miles (2.49 km)	c.1850	Has the tallest underground waterfall in the eastern United States at 210 feet (64 m). Home to the AS107 TKL seismic station.
Worley's Cave		Sullivan County	4.4 miles (7.1 km)	Unknown	Large cave in Sullivan County
Cherokee Bluff Cave		Knox County, Tennessee	1,700 feet (0.52 km)	Unknown	Cave in Knoxville, Tennessee

== See also ==
- List of caves
- List of caves in the United States
- List of caves in Missouri
- List of longest caves in the United States
