= Nickajack Cave =

Large, partially flooded cave in Marion County, Tennessee

Coordinates: 34°59′23.17″N 85°36′37.76″W

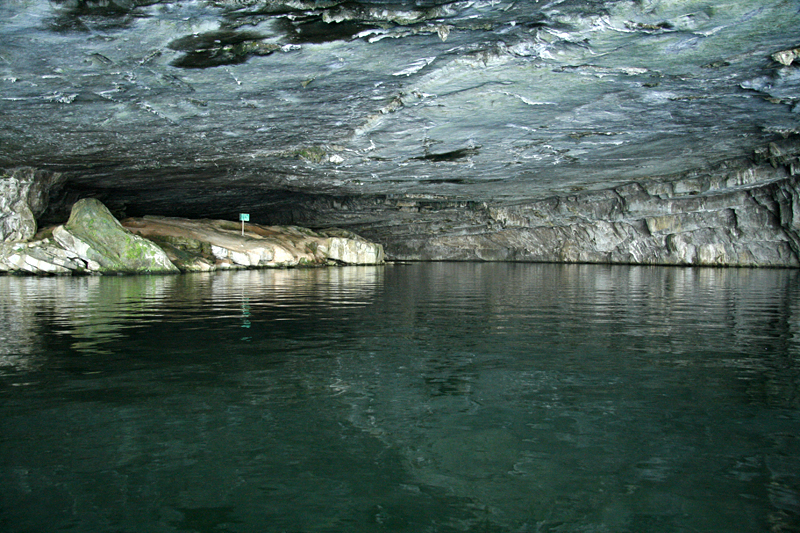
Nickajack Cave

Nickajack Cave is a large, partially flooded cave in Marion County, Tennessee. It was partially flooded by the Tennessee Valley Authority's Nickajack Lake, created by the construction of Nickajack Dam in 1967. The entrance was originally 140 feet wide and 50 feet high. There is now about 25–30 feet of water at the entrance, so the portion of the entrance above water is 140 feet wide and 20–25 feet high. It houses a large colony of gray bats, an endangered species, and the water levels have posed a danger to the bat colony. The cave took its name from the Chickamauga Cherokee town of Nickajack, located between its mouth and the Tennessee River. The town was once attacked and destroyed in 1794 by the Nickajack Expedition.

== Cultural history ==
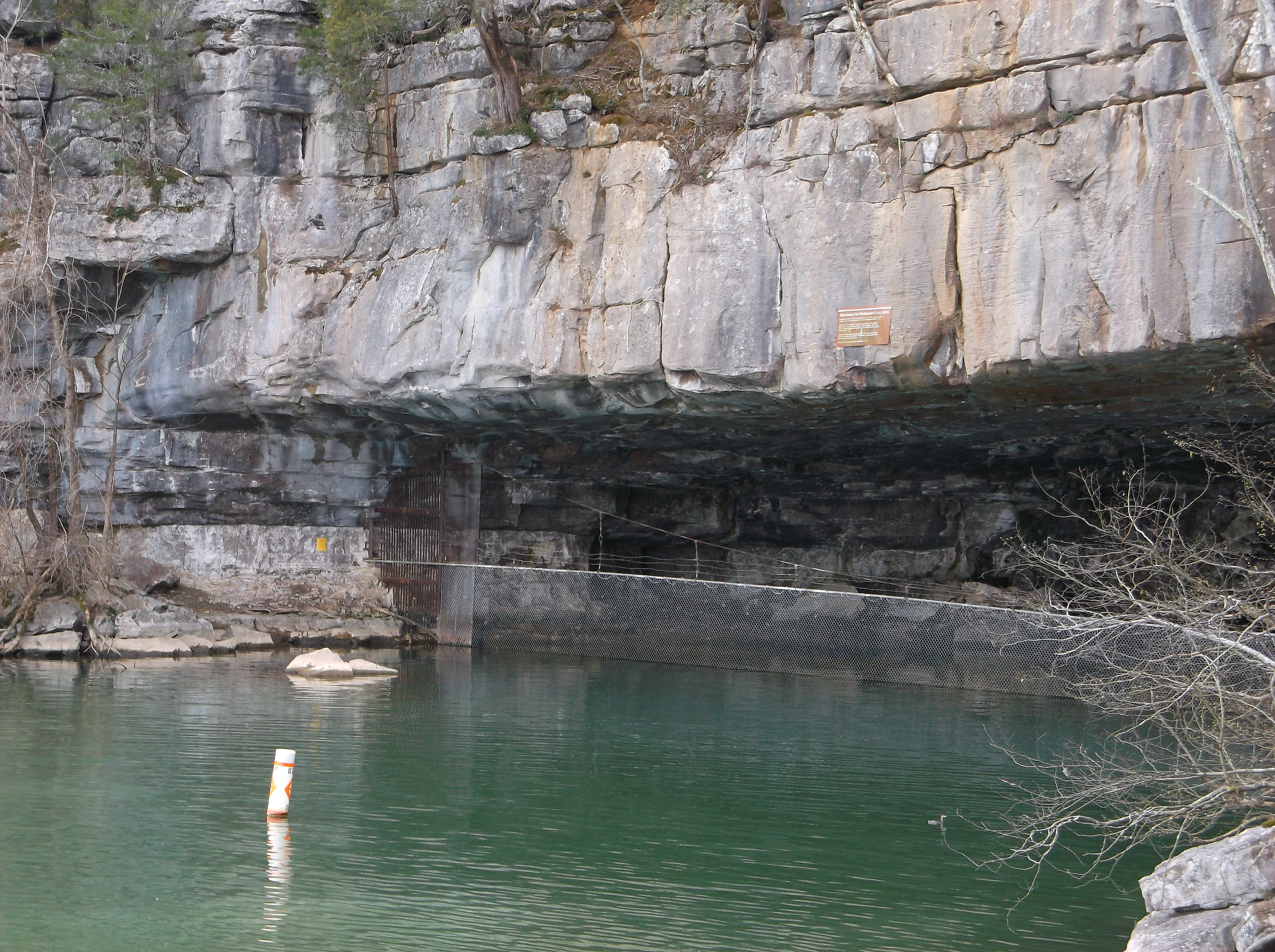
Nickajack Cave

Nickajack Cave was mined for saltpeter by James Ore beginning in 1800. At this time, the cave was on land owned by the Cherokee and this operation was conducted with their permission. This mining continued through the War of 1812. The cave was again mined for saltpeter during the American Civil War, this time by the Confederate Nitre and Mining Bureau. Page 85 of the February 6, 1864 issue of Harper's Weekly shows a drawing of the cave entrance and some of the saltpeter mining and refining equipment located outside the cave. Robert Cravens, a Chattanooga businessman, operated Nickajack Cave and his own cave, Lookout Mountain Cave at the beginning of the Civil War. Soon after the war started, the operation at Nickajack Cave was taken over by the Confederate government. Some time in late 1863 or very early 1864, this area was occupied by Federal troops and mining ceased. Nickajack Cave was one of the largest saltpeter caves operated by the Confederate Nitre Bureau during the Civil War and, as such, was a highly strategic site, since saltpeter was the main ingredient of gunpowder. The loss of Nickajack Cave was a serious blow to the Confederacy.

Musician Johnny Cash visited the cave in 1967, intending to commit suicide inside it, but had a spiritual experience there that caused him to stop his habit of drug abuse. Country singer Gary Allan recorded a song about this experience on his 2005 album Tough All Over.

Nickajack Cave was commercially exploited, off and on, since at least 1872. At that time, a newspaper clipping dated July 2, 1872 describes tours leaving from Chattanooga on the steamer R. J. Jackson providing trips to the cave where guides would take visitors into the cave in boats. Upon exiting the cave, the visitors could catch the train from Shellmound (located directly in front of the cave entrance) back to Chattanooga. By 1927 the cave was being shown by Lawrence S. Ashley, who supposedly disappeared in the cave during exploration. His disappearance was covered by both the local Chattanooga newspapers and the New York Times. After being "lost" from August 15, 1927 through August 22, 1927, Ashley reappears, claiming that he dug his way out through a new entrance located 8 miles away. This entire episode was a hoax designed to gain publicity for the cave and increase the number of tourists visiting the cave. By the 1940s, the cave was being run by Leo Lambert, who is also known for developing nearby Chattanooga tourist attraction Ruby Falls. A cave brochure from this time period refers to the cave as "Nickajack LaCaverns". The cave closed as a commercial operation sometime in the late 1940s. In the early 1960s, before the cave was flooded, the ruins of the gatehouse were present and in concrete floors were evident in the front passages. The entrance to the cave is extremely large. There was a small lake in front of the cave fed by the stream that flowed through the cave.

To access the interior of the cave when tours were no longer being offered, visitors had to walk about one-quarter mile down a waist-deep stream that ran through the cave. There had been a cave-in at the rear of the cave that blocked off what were rumored to be miles of additional passages.

== Natural history ==
At least two endemic species were exterminated when the cave was inundated in 1967 – the pseudoscorpion Microcreagris nickajackensis and the ground beetle Pseudanophthalmus nickajackensis.

Today, Nickajack Cave is a Wildlife Refuge, operated by the Tennessee Wildlife Resources Agency. The cave is home to a bat colony that is estimated to number over 100,000 bats. The cave is a maternity roost where pregnant female gray bats come each spring to give birth and raise their young. There is an observation deck adjacent to the mouth, where visitors can watch the bats leave at dusk to go feed.
