= Rockvale, Tennessee =

Unincorporated community in Tennessee, US

Coordinates: 35°45′26″N 86°31′53″W

Rockvale is an unincorporated community and census-designated place in Rutherford County, Tennessee. The ZIP Code for Rockvale is 37153.

The 2020 population of the CDP was 1,279.

== Geography ==
The latitude of Rockvale is 35.757N. The longitude is -86.531W.

Snail Shell Cave in Rockvale is a large and biologically important cave owned and managed by the Southeastern Cave Conservancy. The cave system drains over 100 square miles (260 km^{2}) of land and the water re-emerges at a major spring on the Stones River.

== Education ==
Rockvale is home to three schools, Rockvale High School for grades 9–12, Rockvale Middle School for grades 6–8, and Rockvale Elementary school for grades PreK-5.
