= English Mountain =

Mountain in the Great Smoky Mountains region of East Tennessee

Coordinates: 35°54′03″N 83°17′52″W

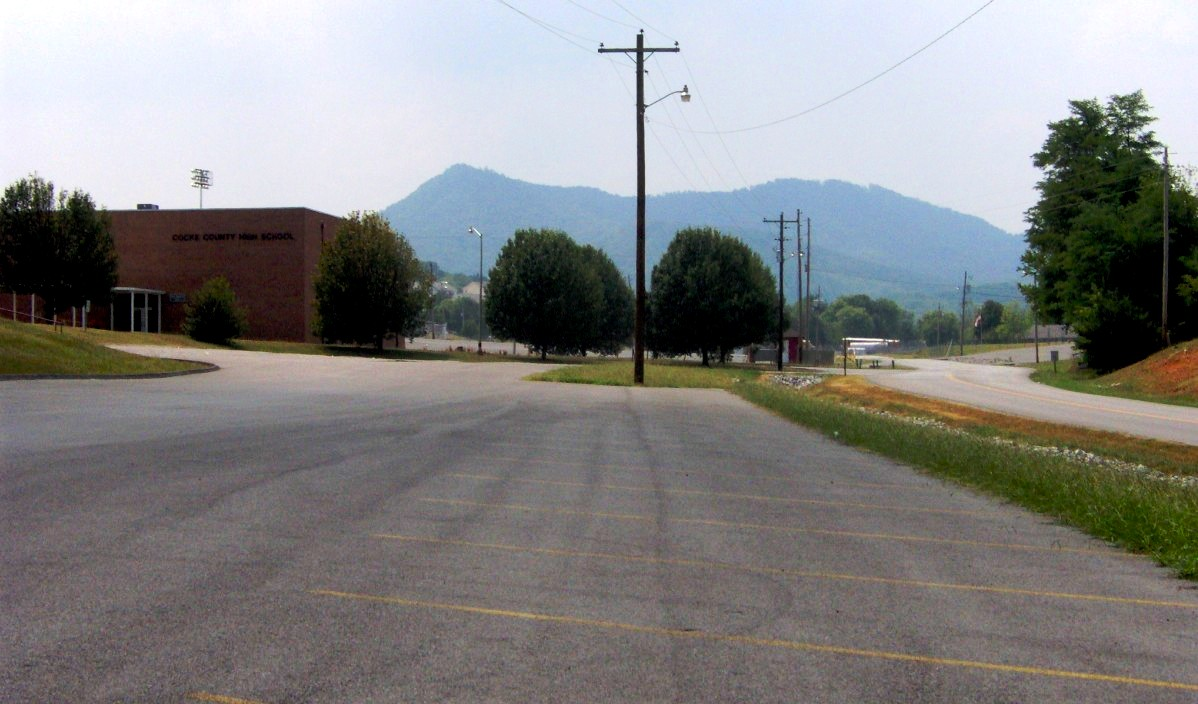
English Mountain, looking west from the Cocke County High School parking lot in Newport, Tennessee

English Mountain is a mountain located in the northeastern foothills of the Great Smoky Mountains region of East Tennessee. Rising to a peak of 3,629 feet, it is known for offering scenic fall colors within a convenient drive from Knoxville.

A few rugged mountain roads provide access to the summit. Alpine Drive provides the main access, providing service to several small communities along with several resort cabins in the area available for tourists. It continues across the gap to the Wilhite area, forming the only complete pass over the mountain to the Jones Cove and Camp Hollow areas at the southeastern foot of the mountain. The English Mountain Fire Lookout Tower is a historic landmark, according to the National Park Service, with a single access via Carson Springs Road. Forbidden Caverns is a cave attraction on the northwestern face of the mountain.

== Source of water ==
The mountain is a significant source of drinking water for nearby communities. The English Mountain Spring releases more than 2 million gallons of water each day, and is the source for several premium bottled water distributors. Since 1997, it has been the source for the English Mountain Spring Water Company of Dandridge, Tennessee, (a supplier of Cracker Barrel restaurants as well to the visitor centers within Great Smoky Mountains National Park).

== April 2016 wildfire ==
In spring 2016, a wildfire consumed several hundred acres of forest on the mountain.

== See also ==
- Chilhowee Mountain, on the western edges of the Great Smoky Mountains
- Foothills Parkway, a scenic byway in the region
