= Foothills Parkway =

National parkway in Tennessee

Foothills Parkway

Route information
- Maintained by NPS
- Length: 38.6 mi (62.1 km)
- Existed: February 22, 1944–present

Western segment
- Length: 33.0 mi (53.1 km)
- South end: US 129 in Chilhowee
- North end: US 321 in Wears Valley

Eastern segment
- Length: 5.6 mi (9.0 km)
- South end: US 321 in Cosby
- North end: I-40 near Hartford

Foothills Parkway Spur
- Length: 4.3 mi (6.9 km)
- South end: US 321 / US 441 in Gatlinburg
- North end: US 321 / US 441 in Pigeon Forge

Location
- Country: United States
- State: Tennessee
- Counties: Blount, Sevier, Cocke

Highway system
- Scenic Byways; National; National Forest; BLM; NPS; Tennessee State Routes; Interstate; US; State

The Foothills Parkway is a national parkway traversing the foothills of the northern Great Smoky Mountains in East Tennessee, in the southeastern United States. The 72.1-mile (114 km) parkway will connect U.S. Route 129 (U.S. 129) along the Little Tennessee River in the west with Interstate 40 (I-40) along the Pigeon River in the east. However, only 33 miles have been completed and made publicly accessible so far.

Portions pass through parts of Blount, Sevier, and Cocke counties. Large sections cross a series of high ridges running roughly parallel to the Tennessee boundary of the Great Smoky Mountains National Park, and offer unobstructed views of the Great Smokies to the south and the Tennessee Valley to the north.

The oldest unfinished highway project in Tennessee, the Foothills Parkway project has been continuously stalled by funding difficulties since Congress authorized its construction in 1944. As of 2018, just over one-half of the parkway has been completed and opened to vehicular traffic, although the right of way for the full length has been acquired.

Sections 8E & 8F (including the "Missing Link") of the parkway was announced completed on November 8, 2018 and opened to the public on Saturday, November 10, 2018, adding 16.1 finished miles. Previously, the longest open section (8H and 8G) consisted of a 16.9-mile (27.2 km) leg traversing the western flank of Chilhowee Mountain in Blount county, connecting U.S. 129 along the Chilhowee Lake impoundment of the Little Tennessee River with U.S. 321 in the town of Walland. The other open section (8A) is a 5.6-mile (9.0 km) stretch traversing Green Mountain in Cocke county, connecting U.S. 321 in Cosby with I-40 in the Pigeon River valley.

The Gatlinburg Bypass, which traverses the eastern flank of Cove Mountain between the north end of Gatlinburg and the national park, connecting to the Great Smoky Mountains Parkway at each end, is also considered part of the parkway. The Great Smoky Mountains Parkway (U.S. 441) from Gatlinburg north to Pigeon Forge is also National Park Service land, connecting the bypass to the right of way for future sections (8D and 8C) of the Foothills Parkway at the southern city limit of Pigeon Forge.

The parkways are managed by the National Park Service as part of Great Smoky Mountains National Park. Unlike other national parkways, they are not a separate unit of the national park system. As with other NPS roads, construction (including repaving) is handled by the Federal Highway Administration (FHWA) through the Federal Lands Transportation Program (FLTP) partnership.

== The foothills of the Great Smoky Mountains ==
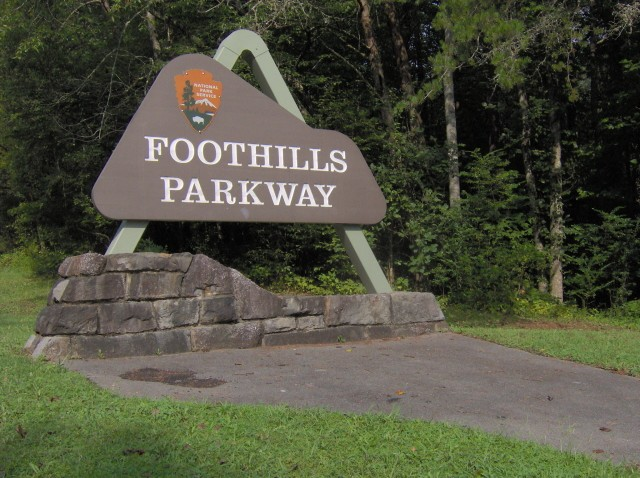
Foothills Parkway's Chilhowee entrance at Walland

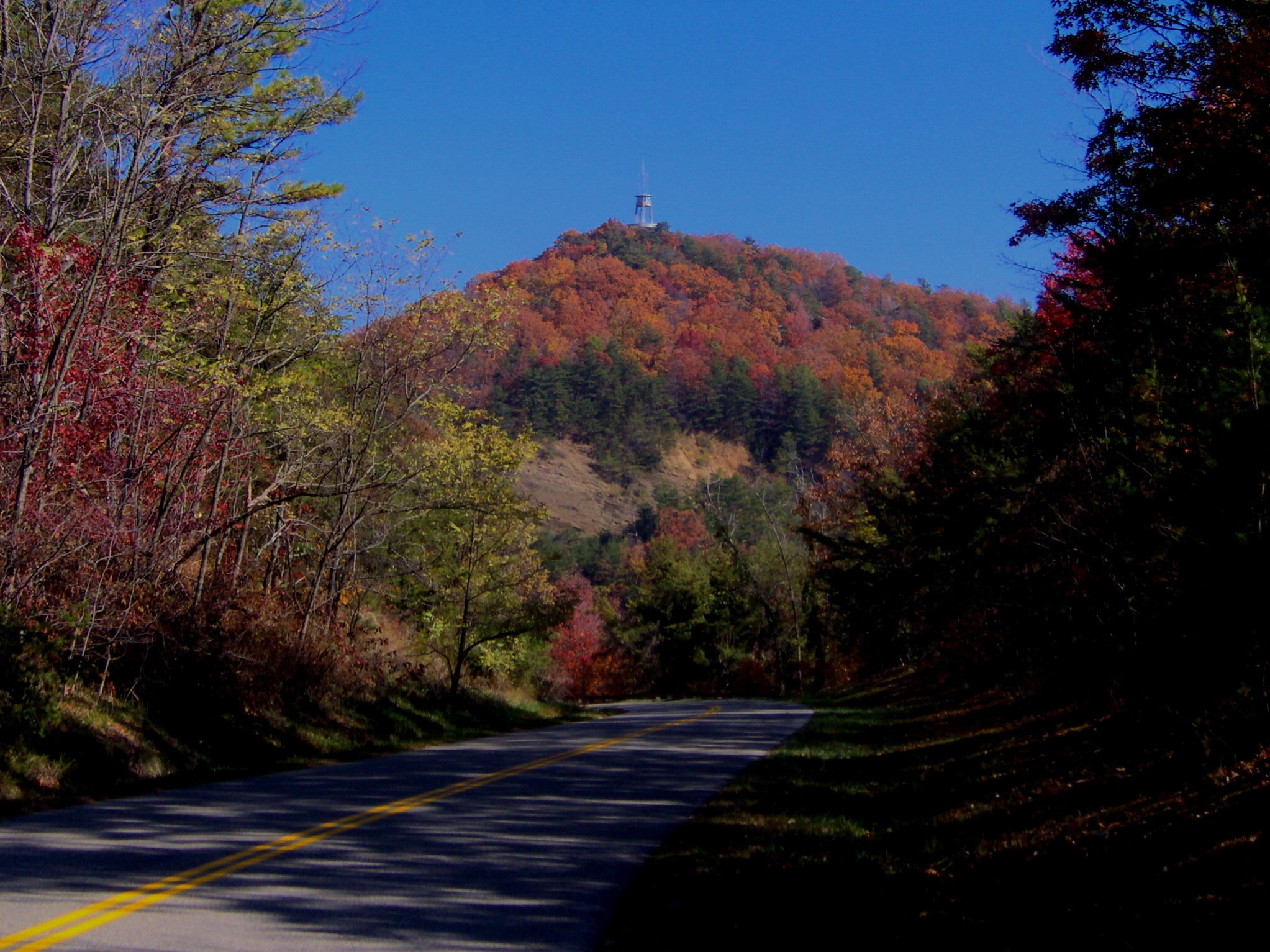
Foothills Parkway approaching Look Rock, on the crest of Chilhowee Mountain

The foothills of the Great Smokies consist of a series of low mountains and hills lying roughly between the Great Smoky Mountains National Park to the south and the flatlands of the Tennessee River and French Broad River valleys to the north. The most prominent of the foothills are characterized by long-but-narrow ridges, running parallel to the crest of the Smokies, similar to a circuit wall surrounding a medieval castle.

Although the average elevation of the foothills is relatively low, a high topographic prominence is not uncommon among these ridges, due to their detachment from the main crest of the Smokies. English Mountain (3,629 ft), one of the highest of the foothills, is the fifth most prominent mountain in Tennessee, and dominates the view south of Interstate 40 for a considerable stretch between Sevierville and Newport. Chilhowee Mountain, located mostly in Blount County is the first major geological structure visible when approaching the mountains via Lamar Alexander Parkway (U.S. 321), and its eastern flank, known as "The Three Sisters", is visible from almost anywhere in Maryville.

Geologically, the foothills largely consist of Cambrian Class III rocks of the Paleozoic period, a type known specifically as the Chilhowee Group. Chilhowee Group rocks, which are mostly sandstones, siltstones, and shales, range in age from about 300 million to 500 million years old. Thus, the rocks of the foothills are much younger than the billion-year old Precambrian Ocoee Supergroup rocks that form the crest and higher ridges of the Great Smokies range.

The most prominent of the foothills include:

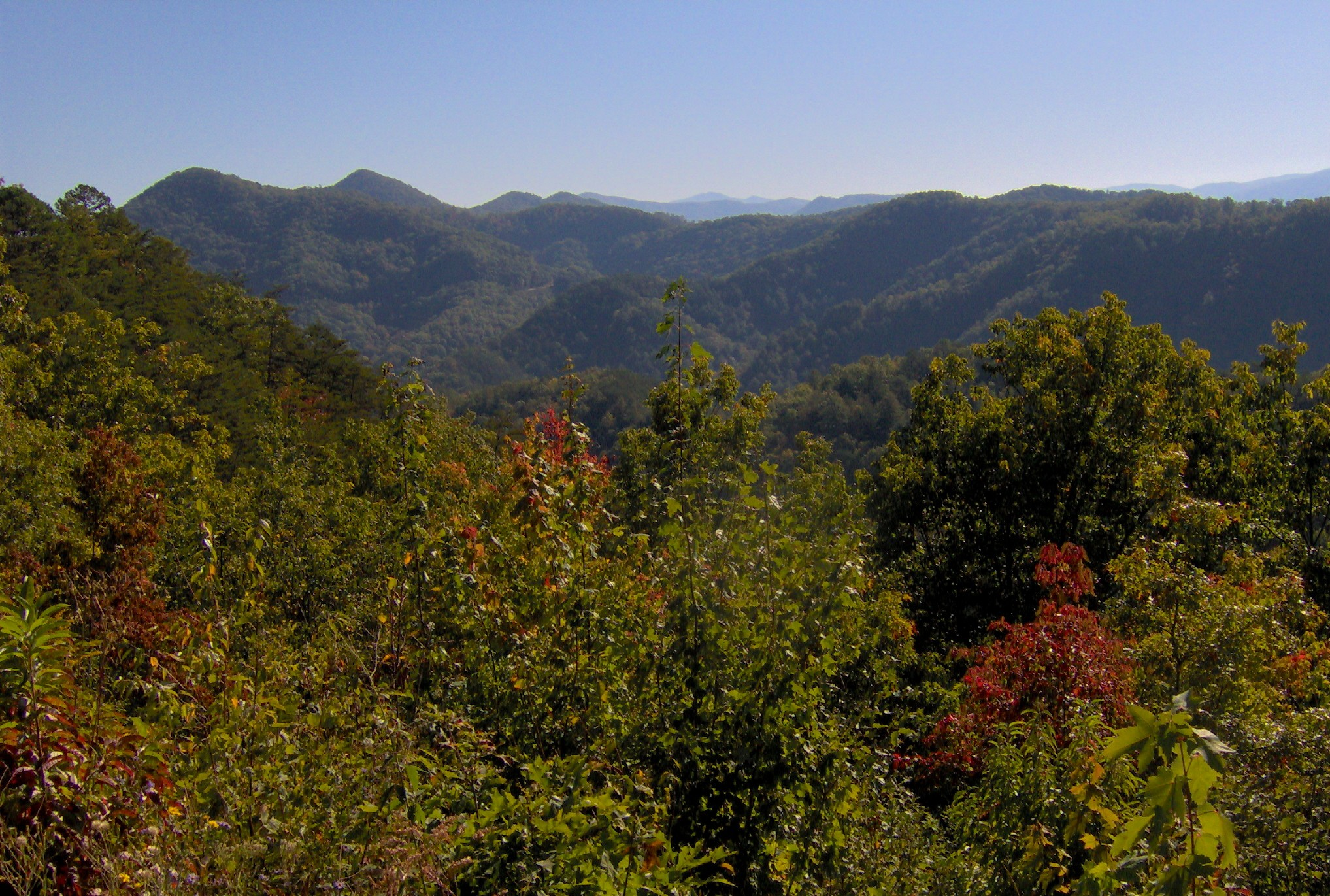
View southeast from the Bates Mountain section (8F) of Foothills Parkway

Chilhowee Mountain — a narrow ridge stretching between the Little Tennessee River (specifically the river's Chilhowee Lake impoundment) and the Little Pigeon River valley to the east. While the mountain is 35 miles (56 km) long, it rarely reaches a width of more than 3 or 4 miles (6.4 km). Little River cuts a large gap in the middle of the mountain (near Walland), dividing it into eastern and western sections. The highest point on eastern section is 2,843 feet (866m) and the highest point on the western section is 2,650 feet (807m) at a knob known as Look Rock. 35.73047°N 83.81993°W

Bates Mountain — a low, bulky ridge between Miller Cove and Tuckaleechee Cove. Bates' highest point is just over 1,700 feet (520 m). Although Bates lacks the dramatic "backbone" formation of Chilhowee, a rocky gorge on its south flank cut by Carr Creek has presented numerous construction challenges for the parkway project. 35.7227°N 83.75161°W

Cove Mountain — a large ridge situated between Wears Valley to the west, Gatlinburg to the east, and Pigeon Forge to the north. The national park boundary traverses part of the crest of Cove Mountain. The mountain's elevation reaches 4,077 feet (1,243m) at its summit. 35.72396°N 83.55905°W

Webb Mountain — a long, narrow ridge stretching roughly from the Middle Prong of the Little Pigeon River in the west to the Cosby area in the east, a distance of roughly 10 miles (14 km). Webb Mountain dominates the view north of U.S. 321 between Pittman Center and Cosby. Its summit, near the middle of the ridge, is 3,100 feet (945m) above sea level. 35.78565°N 83.35071°W

Green Mountain — a small mountain stretching between Cosby to the west and the Pigeon River valley to the east. Its highest point is 2,785 feet (849m) above sea level. 35.8123°N 83.2014°W

English Mountain, the highest of the Foothills at 3,629 feet (1,112m), stretches for nearly 15 miles (24 km) between the East Fork of the Little Pigeon and Newport, paralleling the shores of Douglas Lake. Hall Top (Stone Mountain) rises prominently opposite Green Mountain above the Pigeon River valley. The parkway will not cross any part of English Mountain or Hall Top, however.

== History ==
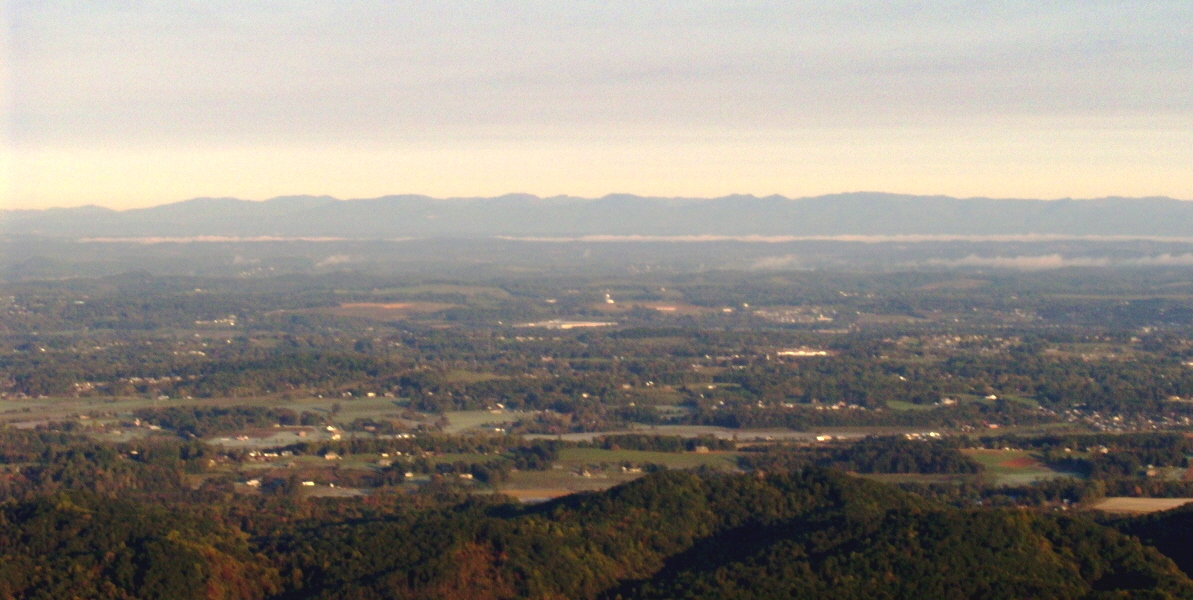
Western Blount County, viewed from Look Rock. The Cumberland Plateau dominates the horizon.

The foothills of the Great Smokies were drawing tourists as early as the mid-19th century. Most visitors during this period came for the area's mineral-rich mountain springs, which were thought to have health-restoring qualities. Resort hotels quickly sprang up throughout the foothills, becoming popular summertime destinations for Knoxville's upper class. The most successful of these resorts were Montvale Springs and Alleghany Springs at the base of Chilhowee Mountain, Kinzel Springs in Tuckaleechee, Line Springs in Wears Valley, and Carson Springs near Newport.

Just before the Civil War, author Sidney Lanier spent several summers at Montvale Springs. The Chilhowee Mountain area would be a major influence on the setting for his first novel, Tiger Lilies. In 1885, Mary Noailles Murfree, one of the first authors to popularize the natural wonders of the Smokies, wrote:

... Chilhowee Mountain, rising up, massive and splendid, against the west. The shadows of the clouds flecked the pure and perfect blue of the sunny slopes with a dusky motling of purple.

The original plan for the Great Smoky Mountains National Park included much of the foothills within the proposed park boundaries, although by the time the park opened in 1934, the boundary had been moved south of Townsend and Wears Valley.

=== The Parkway project ===
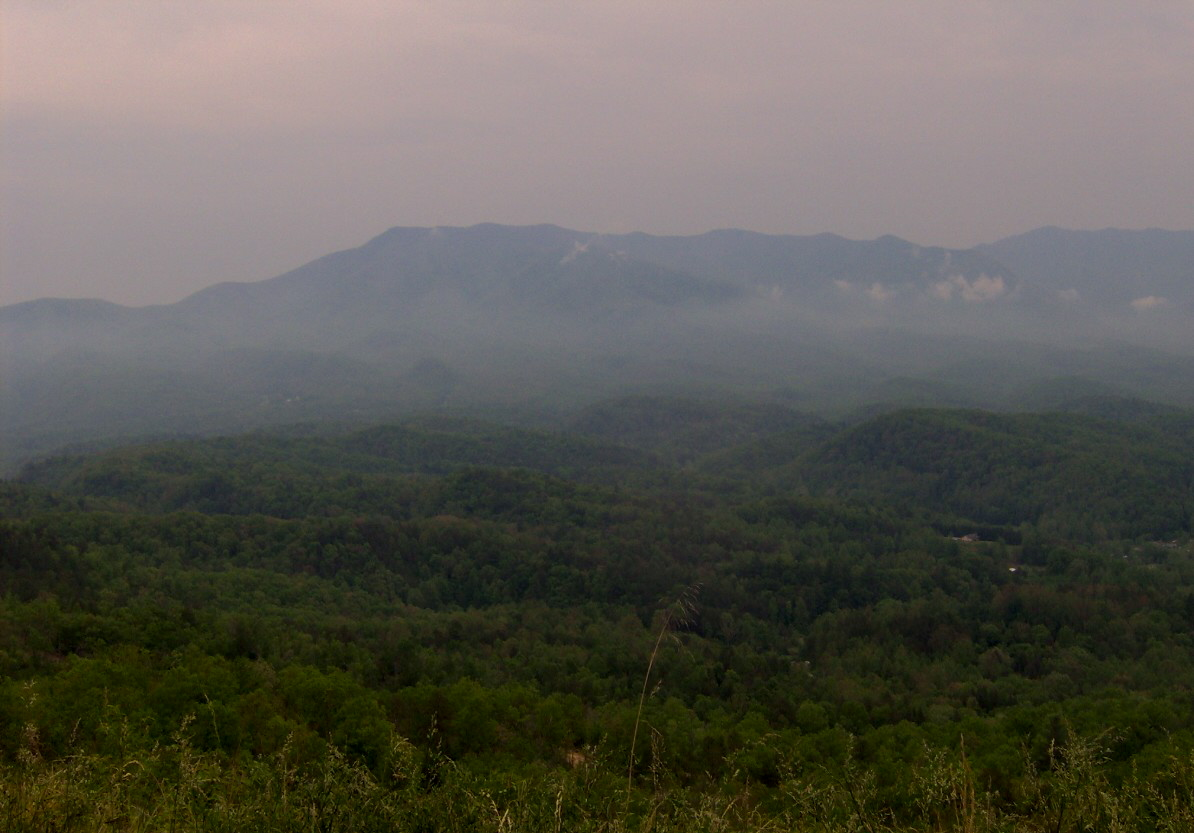
The Eastern Smokies as viewed from the Green Mountain section (8A) of Foothills Parkway

When Congress authorized the construction of the Blue Ridge Parkway in the 1930s, it was decided that no part of the parkway would pass through Tennessee (the goal of the parkway was to connect the Great Smoky Mountains National Park with Shenandoah National Park). Disappointed, Frank Maloney, who was vice-president of the Great Smoky Mountains Conservation Association, began lobbying for a parkway to connect the recreational areas on the Tennessee side of the Great Smokies.

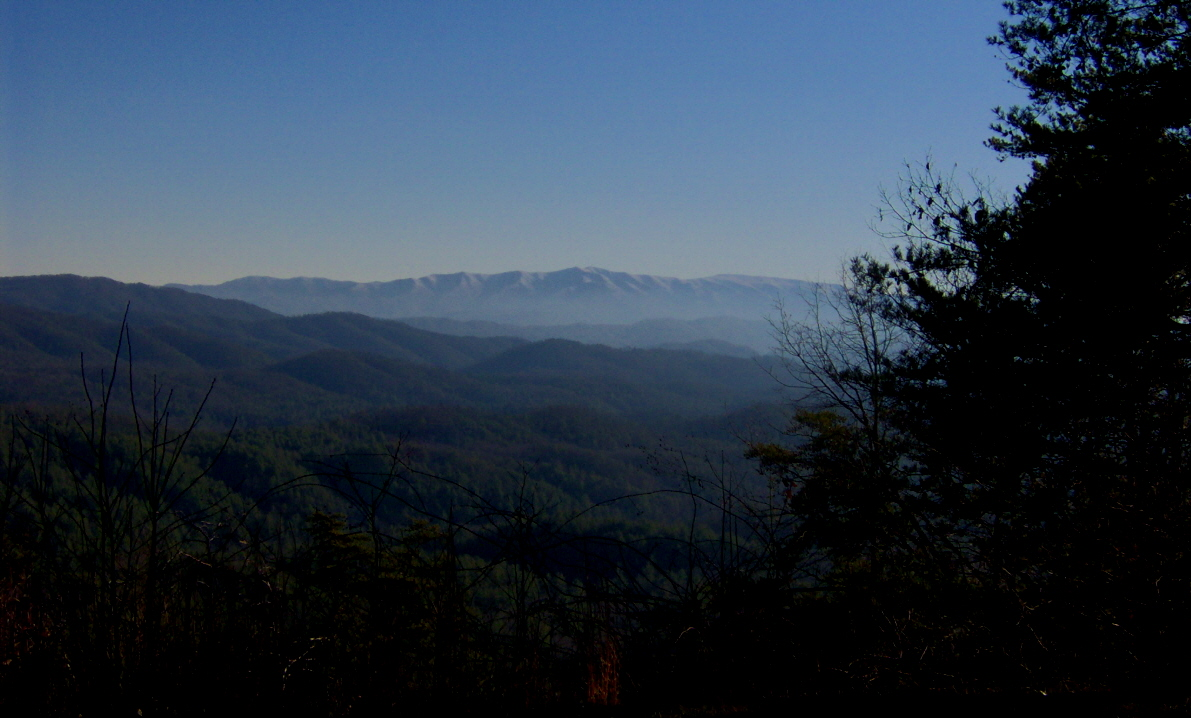
The Yellow Creek section of the Unicoi Mountains, looking west from the Chilhowee section (8H) of Foothills Parkway

In 1944, after extensive lobbying by Congressman B. Carroll Reece, Congress authorized construction of a 71-mile (114 km) road connecting US-129 at Chilhowee Lake and I-40 along the Pigeon River. In 1945, the Tennessee state legislature authorized the Tennessee Highway Department to buy rights-of-way for the road, and a second bill in 1947 authorized the transfer of rights-of-way to the National Park Service.

While the early bureaucratic hurdles had been cleared, the Tennessee Highway Department moved slowly in purchasing the road's rights-of-way. In 1956, park superintendent Edward Hummel managed to get the Foothills Parkway project included in the National Park Service's Mission 66 program, assuring early construction funds. Shortly thereafter, Governor Frank G. Clement authorized the THD to begin buying rights-of-way. Construction finally began in 1960.

The original plan for Foothills Parkway called for eight sections:

- Section 8A — connecting U.S. 321 (now part of I-40) and Cosby via the crest of Green Mountain. This section was completed in the late 1960s. 5.6 miles (9.0 km).
- Section 8B — connecting Cosby to Pittman Center via the crest of Webb Mountain. 14.1 miles (22.7 km).
- Section 8C — connecting Pittman Center to U.S. Route 441 via the low hills south of the Middle Creek area. 9.6 miles (15.4 km).
- Section 8D — connecting US-441 to Wears Valley via the northern flank of Cove Mountain. 9.8 miles (15.8 km).
- Section 8E — connecting Wears Valley to Carr Creek (at the base of Bates Mountain). 9.7 miles (15.6 km). An unfinished 1.6-mile (2.6 km) stretch of this section, known as "The Missing Link", came to symbolize the parkway's financial and engineering struggles. Completed November 2018.
- Section 8F — connecting Carr Creek to Walland via the crest of Bates Mountain. Most of this section was opened (but a dead end) for several years, but was then closed pending completion of Section 8E. Completed November 2018. 6.4 miles (10.3 km).
- Section 8G — connecting Walland to Look Rock via the south flank of Chilhowee Mountain. 10.0 miles (16.1 km). This section was completed and opened to traffic in 1966.
- Section 8H — connecting Look Rock to Chilhowee Lake. 6.9 miles (11.1 km). This section was completed and opened to traffic in 1966.

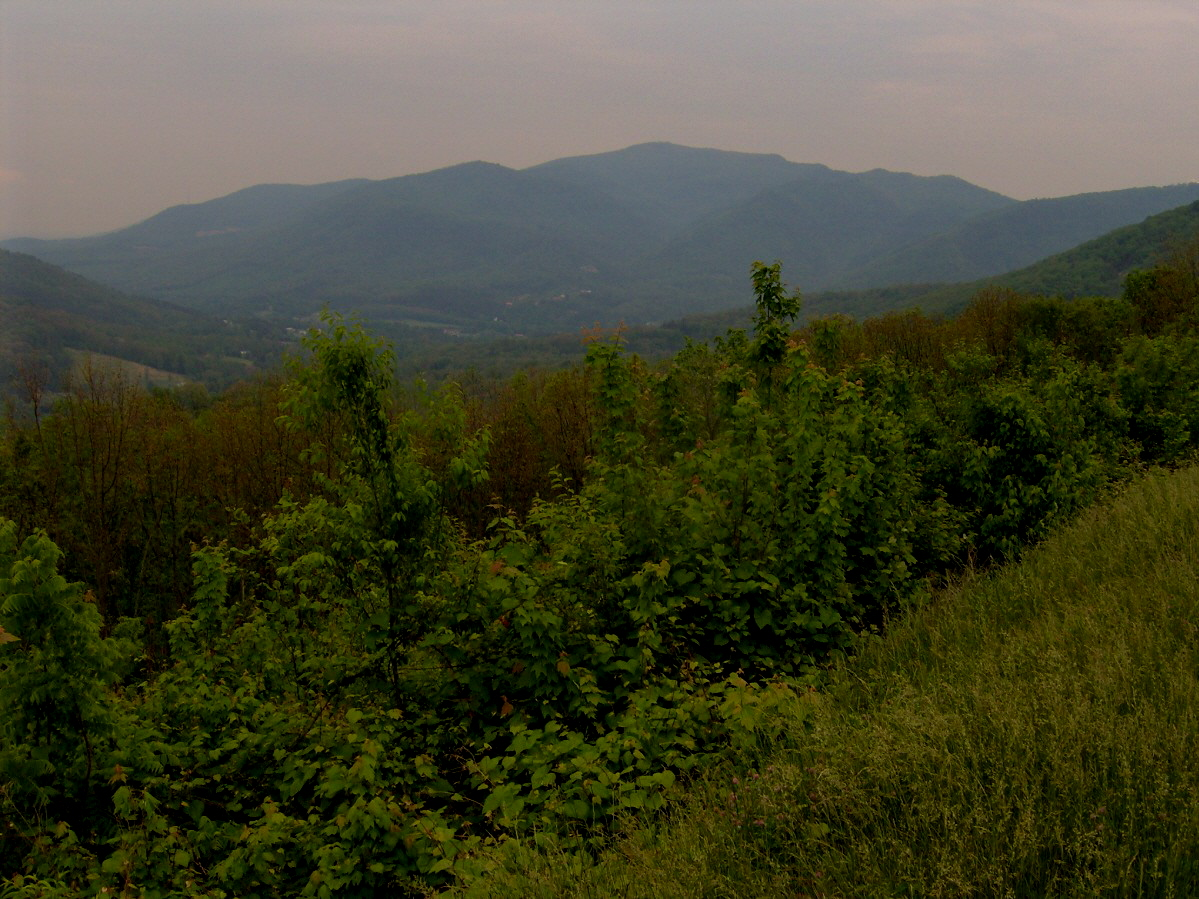
Hall Top, looking east from the Green Mountain section (8A) of Foothills Parkway

After the initial progress in the 1960s, the project again stalled in the 1970s due to funding cuts. By 1978, less than one-third of the proposed parkway had been completed. Construction on the two sections between Walland and Wears Valley finally began in 1984, but after some progress, was halted due to erosion and other environmental issues, specifically the spilling of sulfuric acid into nearby streams. The corridor's route was redesigned, and construction began again in 1994. Tennessee Congressmen John Duncan, Jr. and James Quillen were instrumental in obtaining federal funding for the project from the 1980s until the 2010s.

In recent years, the Foothills Parkway project has become controversial due to the already-high volume of vehicular traffic that passes through the Smokies each year. Some argue that the parkway will add to the congestion, while others say it will help relieve congestion by drawing off some of the park's traffic. Furthermore, because parkways always seem to rank low in budgetary priorities, it will likely take several more decades to complete the entire parkway. The Blue Ridge Parkway, the major influence for Foothills Parkway, had taken over five decades to complete in 1984; likewise, construction on the Natchez Trace Parkway, which began in 1939, was not completed until 2005.

Although no funding has been set aside for the remaining sections of the parkway between Wears Valley and Cosby, the NPS still owns the rights-of-way, and their completion has not been ruled out. In early 2007, the National Park Service began conducting an environmental impact assessment and collecting public input regarding section 8B (Pittman Center to Cosby).

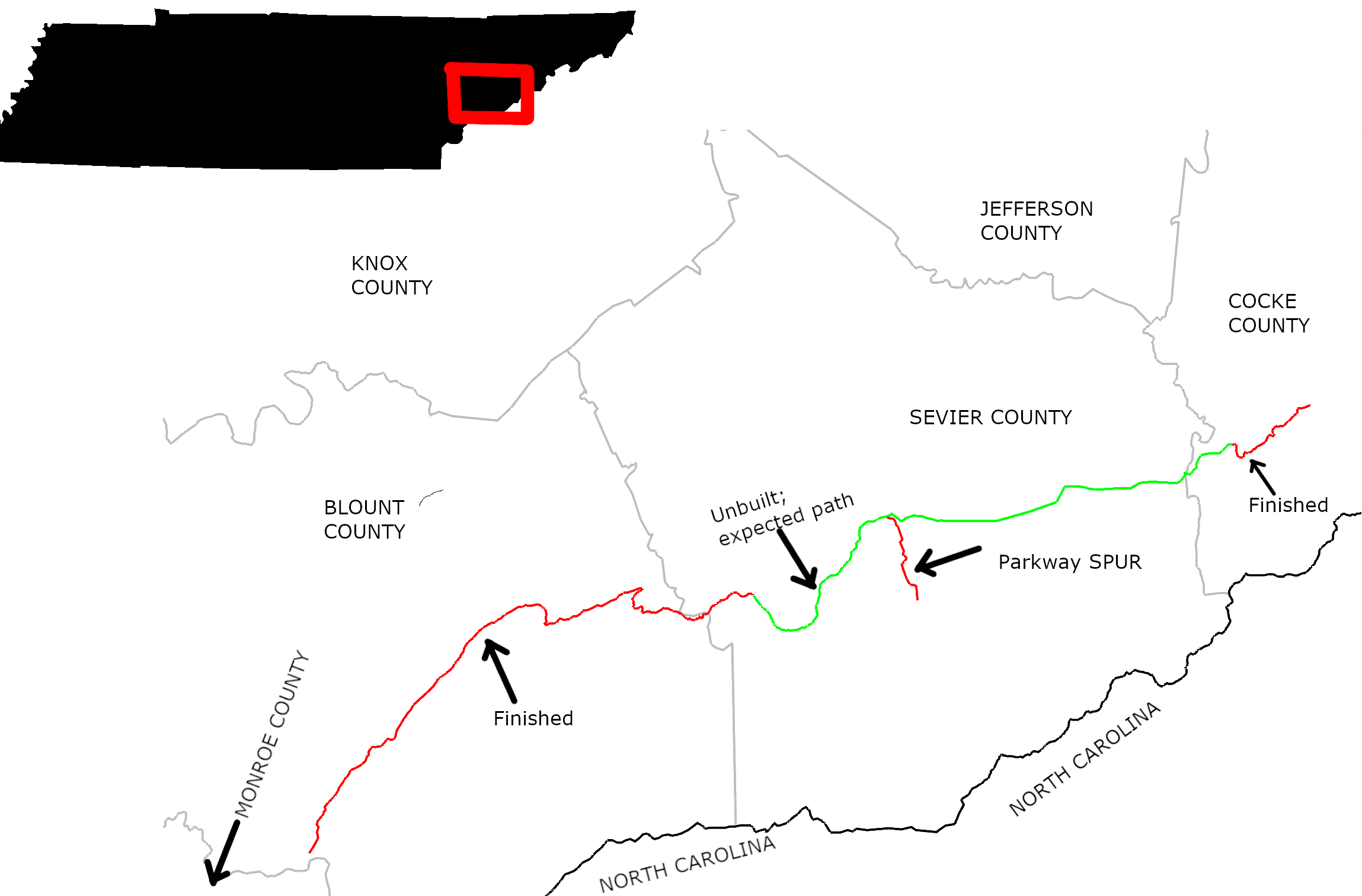
Foothills Parkway map of finished and expected unfinished sections and the counties it resides in.

== Route description ==
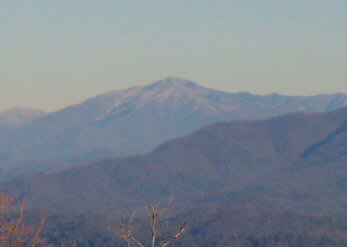
Mount Le Conte, viewed from Look Rock

Much like the Blue Ridge Parkway and Skyline Drive, the completed sections of the Foothills Parkway traverse what would be otherwise roadless ridge crests, allowing for extensive views of the surrounding areas.

The Chilhowee Mountain section of the parkway has been open since 1966. There are four overlooks on its north side (looking into the Tennessee Valley), and eight overlooks on its south side (looking into the Smokies).

The highest point on the western section of Chilhowee Mountain is 2,650 ft (808 m) at a knob known as Look Rock. An observation tower has been erected there, allowing a 360-degree view of Blount County and the Western Smokies. The parking area for Look Rock is just off the parkway, with a half-mile trail leading to the tower.

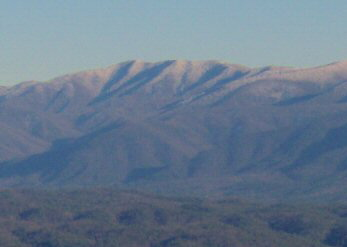
Thunderhead Mountain, viewed from Look Rock

The Rich Mountain/Cades Cove Mountain massif dominates the view immediately to the east. Gregory Bald rises like a giant dome to the south-southeast. To the southwest, the Yellow Creek section of the Unicoi Mountains is visible, along with a dramatic view of Chilhowee's western ridgeline.

Several of the highest mountains in the Smokies can be seen from Look Rock. Kuwohi and Thunderhead Mountain are visible to the southeast, and Mount Le Conte is visible to the east. On a clear day, the high peaks of the Eastern Smokies— Mount Guyot, Mount Chapman, and Old Black— are visible farther to the east.

Looking north from Look Rock, most of Blount and parts of Loudon and Monroe counties are visible. Knoxville's McGhee Tyson Airport presents as a long greenish strip to the north-northwest, and to the north the lights of Knoxville begin to appear around sunset. The Cumberland Plateau dominates much of the northern horizon.

Foothills Parkway crosses Green Mountain in diagonal fashion, traversing the southwest and northeastern flanks of the mountain. From the southwest section, Mount Cammerer and the Eastern Smokies dominate the view. From the northeast section, English Mountain presents as a large ridge to the northwest, and Hall Top rises in peak-like fashion to the east. The lights of Newport are visible early in the morning and later in the evening.

== Major intersections ==
County	Location	mi	km	Destinations	Notes
Blount	Chilhowee	0.0	0.0	US 129 (SR 115 / Calderwood Highway) – Fontana Dam, Maryville	Western segment southern terminus
Blount	Walland	16.9	27.2	US 321 (SR 73 / East Lamar Alexander Parkway) – Townsend, Maryville	Interchange
Sevier	Wears Valley	33.0	53.1	US 321 (SR 73 / Wears Valley Road) – Townsend, Pigeon Forge	Western segment northern terminus
Sevier	Pigeon Forge			US 321 (SR 73) / US 441 (SR 71) – Pigeon Forge, Gatlinburg, Great Smoky Mountains National Park	Future interchange (unfunded)
Sevier	Pittman Center			SR 416 (Pittman Center Road)	Future interchange (unfunded)
Cocke	Cosby	0.0	0.0	US 321 / SR 32 (Cosby Highway) – Gatlinburg, Newport	Eastern segment southern terminus
Cocke		5.6	9.0	I-40 – Knoxville, Asheville	Eastern segment northern terminus; I-40, exit 443
1.000 mi = 1.609 km; 1.000 km = 0.621 mi: Unopened

=== Spur route ===
Part of the Great Smoky Mountains Parkway (U.S. 441/321, often just called "Parkway") is considered a "spur" of the unbuilt part of the Foothills Parkway. The entire route is in Sevier County.

Location	mi	km	Destinations	Notes
Gatlinburg	0.0	0.0	US 321 north (SR 73) / US 441 south (SR 71) – Great Smoky Mountains National Park via downtown Gatlinburg	Continuation as Great Smoky Mountains Parkway
Gatlinburg	0.3	0.48	Gatlinburg Bypass – Great Smoky Mountains National Park	No northbound exit to bypass
Pigeon Forge	4.2	6.8	Foothills Parkway (unbuilt sections 8C to east and 8D to west)	Future interchange (unfunded)
Pigeon Forge	4.3	6.9	US 321 south (SR 73) / US 441 north (SR 71) – Sevierville	Continuation as Great Smoky Mountains Parkway
1.000 mi = 1.609 km; 1.000 km = 0.621 mi: Incomplete access; Unopened

== See also ==
- Blue Ridge Parkway
- Cherohala Skyway
- Gatlinburg Bypass
- Natchez Trace Parkway
