= Southeastern Cave Conservancy Inc. =

United States not-for-profit corporation

The Southeastern Cave Conservancy (SCCi) is a United States not-for-profit corporation dedicated to cave conservation, caver education, and cave management. It was formed in 1991 by a group of southeastern United States cavers. The SCCi is an institutional member of the National Speleological Society.

According to its Articles of Incorporation, the organization's purpose is "to acquire and manage caves for scientific study, education of those persons interested in speleology, and conservation of these resources".

== Caves and preserves ==
The organization owns or leases 1,216 acres (4.92 km^{2}) of land in six states, 170+ caves, 32 cave preserves, and over $1.5 million in land assets. The SCCi is particularly interested in caves that are threatened with closure or destruction or those that provide a habitat for endangered species such as the gray bat, Tennessee cave salamander, and Hart's-tongue fern.

Caves and preserves owned or leased by the organization are listed below.

=== Alabama ===
- Anderson Cave (one major cave and four smaller caves), Shelby County
- Falling Cave, Jackson County
- Fern Cave (Surprise Pit entrance), Jackson County
- Glove Pit, Madison County
- Horse Skull and Jack's Hole, Jackson County
- Kennamer Cave (two caves), Jackson County
- Jacobs Mountain Preserve, Jackson County
- Limrock Blowing Cave Preserve, Jackson County
- Neversink Cave, Jackson County
- Steward Spring Cave, DeKalb County
- Stephens Gap Callahan Cave Preserve (five caves), Jackson County
- Tumbling Rock Cave, Jackson County
- Valhalla Cave (one major cave and three smaller ones), Jackson County

=== Florida ===
- Hollow Ridge, Jackson County
- Jennings Cave, Marion County

=== Georgia ===
- Fox Mountain (at least seven caves), Dade County
- Frick's Cave, Walker County
- Charles B. Henson Cave Preserve at Johnsons Crook (at least 34 caves, Dade County
- Howard's Waterfall Cave, Dade County

=== Kentucky ===
- Frenchman Knob Cave, Hart County
- Logsdon Cave (William R. Halliday Cave Preserve), Hart County

=== Tennessee ===
- Gourdneck Cave, Marion County
- Holly Creek Cave, Wayne County
- Mayapple Cave and Meander Cave, Grundy County
- Rattling Cave, Cocke County
- Run To The Mill Cave Preserve, Cumberland County
- Sinking Cove (includes five major caves and five smaller ones), Franklin County
- Snail Shell Cave, Rutherford County
- South Pittsburg Pit, Marion County
- Wolf River Cave, Fentress County

=== West Virginia ===
- Lobelia Saltpeter Cave, Pocahontas County
