= Cherokee Caverns =

Cave in Tennessee, United States

Coordinates: 35.9804°N 84.1634°W

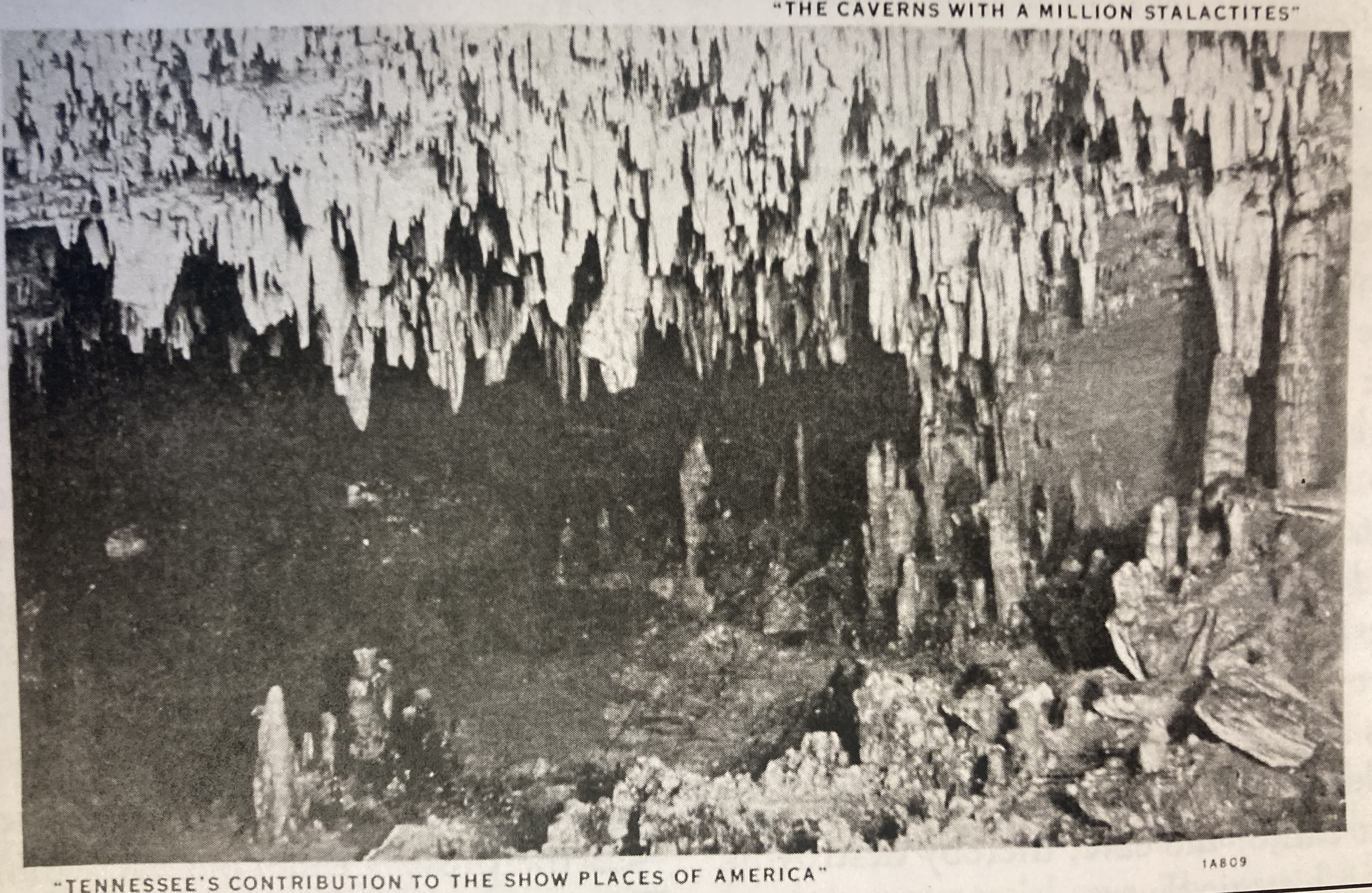
A postcard from the caves' time as Grand Caverns

Cherokee Caverns is 14 miles west of Knoxville and can be accessed by Highway 62. It is gated.

== Geology ==
The cave contains many formations, including stalagmites, stalagmites, flowstone, and small mud volcanos. It is 1500 feet long.

== History ==
It was discovered in 1854 by Robert Crudgington, who noticed fog emerging between rocks on his farm. He dug the entrance open and explored the cave. His daughter Margaret Crudgington opened the cave to the public in 1929 under the name Gentrys Cave; the next year she changed the name to Grand Caverns. Under this name, it was extensively photographed for postcards. It has had other names throughout the years. It is currently called Cherokee Caverns, referring to the historic tribe who occupied this area at the time of European colonization. Artifacts located in the cave indicate that another entrance to the cave existed at some time in the past.

From 1989 to 2011, the cave held an annual Halloween event, "Haunted Cave". Since 2011, it has been replaced with a more family friendly trick or treating event.

In 2019, the cave flooded, destroying much of the infrastructure put in place over the years.
