= Snail Shell Cave =

Cave in Tennessee (US)

Coordinates: 35°46′57″N 86°32′10″W

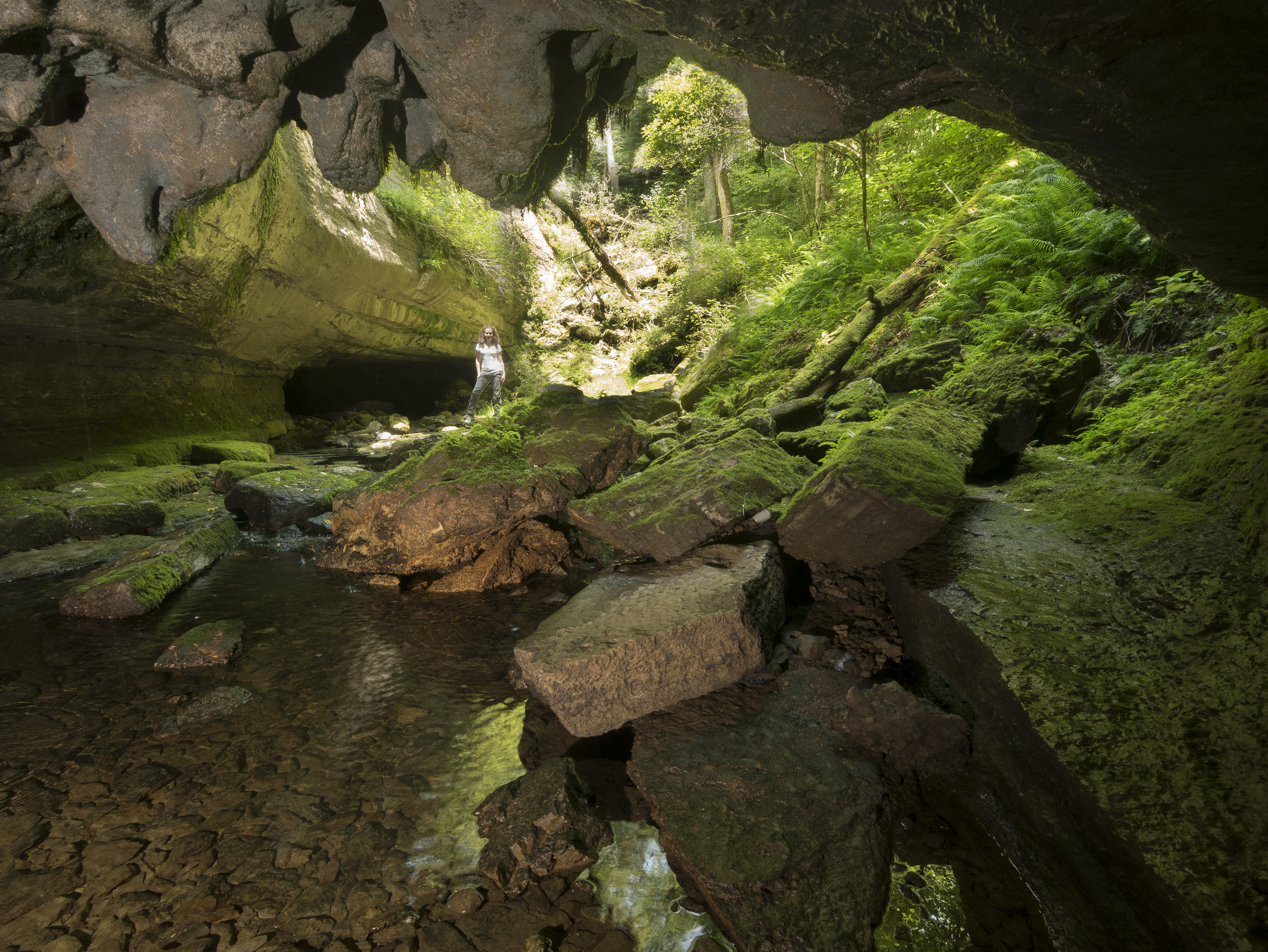
This is in the main entrance of Snail Shell Cave in Tennessee. It is a Karst Window entrance, where a collapse has occurred into the middle of a cave stream passage. Here you are in one arm of the passage looking into the other arm. The cave extends for long distances each way with flotation required in much of it.

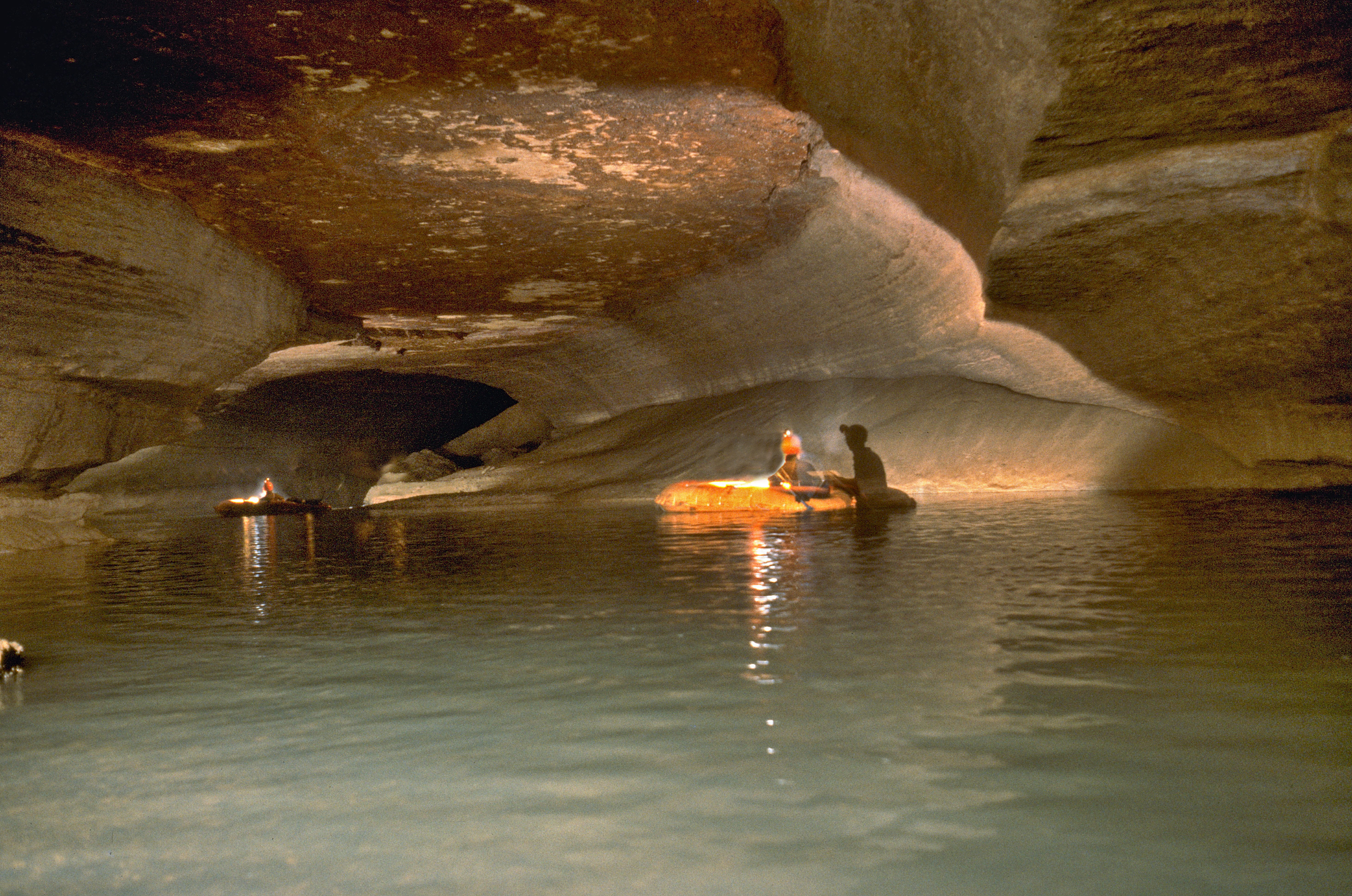
The Grand Canal in Snail Shell Cave, Tennessee. Much of the cave requires a reliable boat to explore.

Snail Shell Cave is a limestone cave in Rockvale, Tennessee. Snail Shell Cave lies on an 88-acre (36 ha) preserve near Murfreesboro, Tennessee. Snail Shell cave is owned by the Southeastern Cave Conservancy, which has called it "one of the most biologically significant cave sites in the southeastern United States."

The cave has more than 9 miles (14 km) of surveyed passages, making it the longest continuous cave in the Tennessee Central Basin region. It is part of a system of caves known to have more than 13 miles (21 km) of passages.

The mouth of Snail Shell Cave is a sinkhole, with nearly vertical walls, 125 feet in diameter and 60 feet deep. The cave stream flows across the bottom and may be followed upstream or downstream. The entrance to Snail Shell Cave was known to local residents, but deep water prevented serious exploration. Tom Barr and Bert Denton located the entrance in September 1951 and became the first modern cave explorers in the cave. "

Anyone wishing to visit Snail Shell Cave must have permission from the Southeastern Cave Conservancy, Inc. to enter the cave. At least one member of any group entering the cave is required to be either an SCCi or an NSS (National Speleological Society) member. Due to the deep water and flooding conditions encountered in this cave, this cave must be considered extremely dangerous and should not, under any circumstances, be entered by anyone who is not a highly skilled cave explorer. Several people have already died in this cave.

For the most complete information available on Snail Shell Cave and the other caves that compose the Snail Shell Cave System, you may wish to consult the book "Snail Shell Cave" (August, 2012) by Larry E. Matthews and Bob Biddix. Published by the National Speleological Society, this book is 241 pages long and contains numerous maps and photographs of the caves. ("Snail Shell Cave", ISBN 978-1-879961-44-9)
