= Subterranean waterfall =

Waterfall located underground

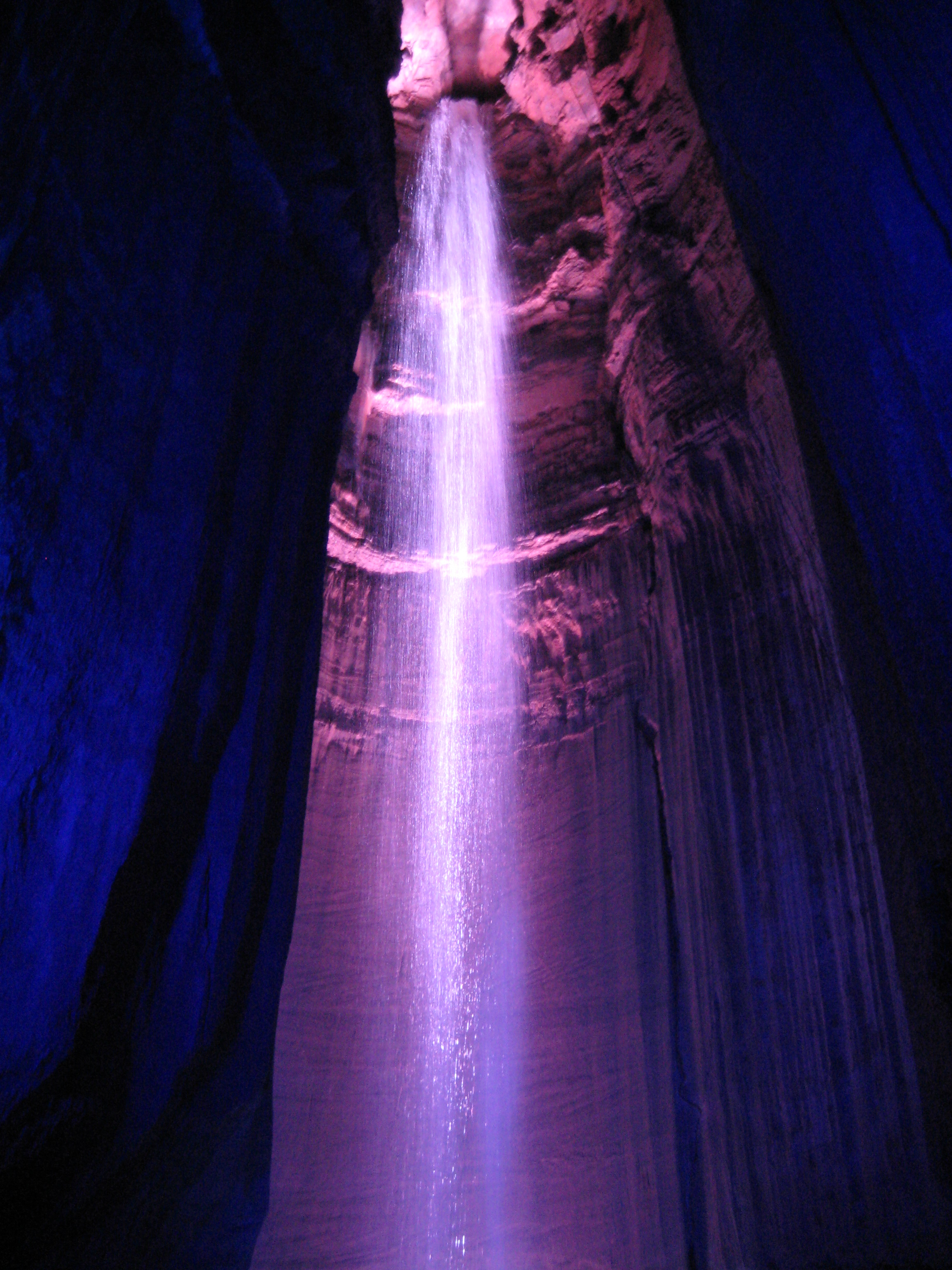
Ruby Falls is an underground waterfall within a cave in Tennessee, United States

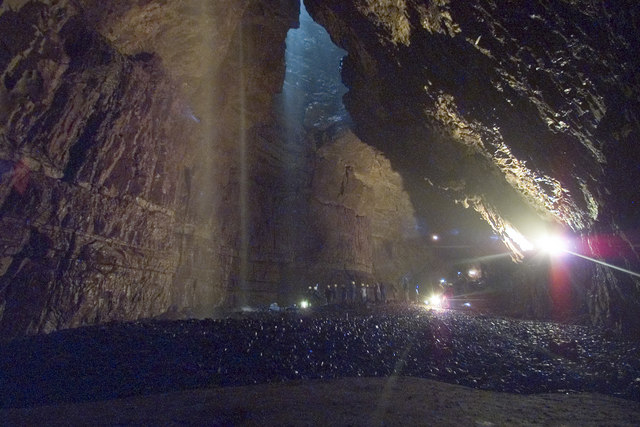
Gaping Gill chamber with the waterfall in the background.

A subterranean waterfall, tierous waterfall, or underground waterfall is a waterfall located underground, usually in a cave or mine. They are a common feature in cave systems where there are vertical or near vertical geological structures for the weathering process to exploit, and sufficient gradient between the sink and the rising. The highest known subterranean waterfall is in the Vrtoglavica Cave in Slovenia, with at least 400 metres (1,300 ft).

== Notable examples ==
Name	Height	Location	Notes
Vrtoglavica Cave waterfall	400 m (1,300 ft)	Plužna, Bovec (Slovenia)	Highest subterranean waterfall
Gaping Gill waterfall	98 m (322 ft)	North Yorkshire, England (United Kingdom)	Located in the Yorkshire Dales
Grotte aux Fées waterfall	77 m (253 ft)	Saint-Maurice, Valais (Switzerland)	The highest waterfall in a show cave
Silver Falls	64 m (210 ft)	Townsend, Tennessee (United States)	Located in the Tuckaleechee Caverns
Ruby Falls	44 m (144 ft)	Chattanooga, Tennessee (United States)	
Lacy Suicide Falls	42 m (138 ft)	Cass, West Virginia (United States)	Located in the Cass Cave

== See also ==
- List of waterfalls
- List of caves
- Subterranean river
- Subglacial lake
- Underground lake
