= Lookout Mountain Caverns =

Cave in Hamilton County, Tennessee, United States

Coordinates: 35°01′09″N 85°20′21″W

Lookout Mountain Caverns (Lookout Mountain Cave, or Lower Cave) is the second-longest known cave in Hamilton County, Tennessee. Its mapped length of 2.481 miles (3.993 kilometers) places it at 361st on the United States Long Caves List. Unofficially, anecdotal reports of cave expeditions have exceed 12 miles with legends exceeding 82 miles. The cave is closed and public access is forbidden.

== Entrance ==
The Lookout Mountain Cave entrance was at the base of Lookout Mountain along the Tennessee River at Moccasin Bend. The original opening was natural, unlike manmade access to Ruby Falls. The opening is visible from "right-of-way boundaries" of the Railway and Interstate 24, although it is widely considered to be sealed inside the tunnel. Despite the closure, the cave is bisected by a tunnel on a second railroad just south of the main entrance, forcing one to emerge on the railway inside the tunnel and then access the rest of the cave from there. Officially, the cave is closed; therefore, accessing the cave is regarded as illegal trespassing.

A 400-foot (120 m) elevator shaft was built in 1928/1929, but it was closed and sealed in 2005.

Legend tells of an entrance at Noccalula Falls Park in Gadsden, Alabama. (near that state's Lookout Mountain) about 82 miles (132 km) away from Lookout Mountain. The entrance may have been closed in 1870 by dynamite due to moonshining, the legend has received significant attention by geologists and others.

== Attractions ==
Several miles of the lower cave are mapped and developed with wooden steps and lighting.

=== Rock Formations ===
- Mystic Cove
- Solomon's Temple
- Devil's Seat
- the Oriental Palace
- the Winding Serpentine Trail

The cave floor contains 13 square stone boxes. The history of the boxes is unknown and has been speculated to have been involved in either Masonic or Ku Klux Klan meetings. Moonshiners and outlaws also utilized the cave.

== History ==
=== Prehistory ===
The cave is estimated to be 240 million years old. A 2005 expedition in Lookout Mountain Cave identified bones that dated back to the last ice age (Pleistocene). A 1992 expedition found three jaguar skeletons, and in 1982 other animal remains were found and transferred to the Louisville Museum of Natural History.

=== 1800s ===
The cave served as a campsite for the indigenous Native Americans. David S. Butrick from the Brainerd Mission, established in 1817, was the first to document visiting the lower cave in 1823.

Lookout Mountain Cave was owned by Robert Cravens during the American Civil War. He contracted with the Tennessee Military and Financial Board to deliver saltpeter to the Confederate government. On June 1, 1862, he rented the cave to the Confederate Nitre and Mining Bureau, who operated the cave until 1863 when Federal forces occupied Chattanooga. At one point the saltpeter mining operation was attacked by Federal forces: "Morale suffered after forces under General Ormsby M. Mitchel shelled the cave on June 7, 1863." Clearly, the cave was still in Confederate hands on that date. (See Matthews, 2007) The cave was also used as a hospital in the civil war where patients/visitors left 'graffiti' which may include the signature of Andrew Jackson.

An 1869 article appearing in Scientific American notes a cave within Lookout Mountain that extends over 8 miles.

in 1898 J.B. Pound sold underground rights to Southern Railway.

=== 1900s ===
Between 1905 and 1908, the Southern Railway developed a double-track tunnel through part of Lookout Cave. Pollution from the locomotives deposited soot throughout the cave.

==== 1920s-1930s ====
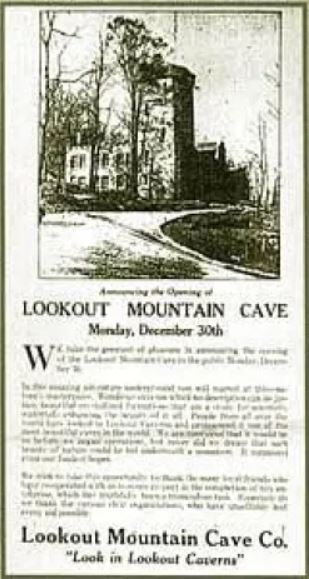
Lookout Mountain Cave

Leo Lambert (1895-1955) was a chemist and natural scientist credited with first exploring Raccoon Mountain Caverns. He married Ruby Eugenia Losey in 1916. In 1923, Lambert attempted to reopen Lookout Mountain Cave to open a tourist attraction as the Lookout Mountain Cave Company. In 1928, he drilled to open a 400 ft. elevator shaft, however, on December 28 an opening was discovered and the following 17 hours were spent exploring, resulting in the discovery of a 145 ft waterfall draining into the Tennessee River which Lambert named after his wife, Ruby, as Ruby Falls. Lambert developed both caves for his company, however, the 'upper cave' with Ruby Falls was far more popular than the 'lower cave' Lookout Mountain Cave therefore he discounted tours in 1935. The Great Depression resulted in bankruptcy causing Lambert to sell to Claude Brown for $25,000.

==== 1940s ====
Claude Brown died in 1944. His wife controlled the cave and sold it between 1947 and 1949, eventually entering the partial ownership of the Lookout Advertising Company known posting roadside signs.

==== 1960 ====
Although Lookout Mountain Caverns has not been open to tourists for quite some time, the management of Ruby Falls did allow researchers to take the elevator (the shaft excavated in 1928–1929) down to Lookout Mountain Caverns by prior arrangement. This access resulted in the discovery of new passages since Thomas C. Barr Jr.'s description was published in 1961. Barr's 1961 discussion of the cave says that the cave was intersected by a railway tunnel, and thus the cave accumulated soot that led to its closing to tourists. He says that "exploring of the cave is unpleasant because of the necessity of wading, crawling, climbing, and becoming covered with soot, which coats all the upward-facing surfaces." He says the soot extends well over a mile into the cave.

==== 1980s-1990s ====
Various academic expeditions:

- March 1982: Joel Sneed, Carole Sneed, and Larry O. Blair

=== 2000s ===
In 2005 the State of Tennessee's elevator inspectors required the Ruby Falls operators to seal the portion of the elevator shaft below Ruby Falls and the cave became totally inaccessible as of 2006.
