= Cherokee Bluff Cave =

Cave in Knoxville, Tennessee, US

Coordinates: 35.942°N 83.927°W

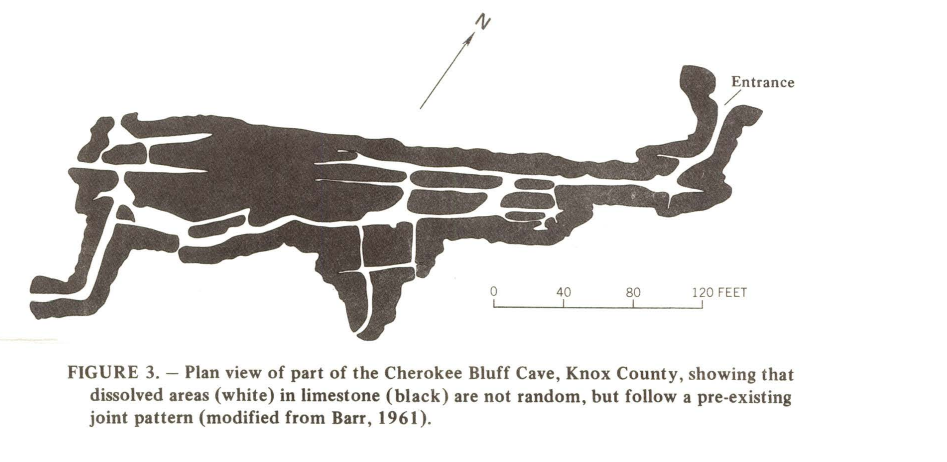
- Length: 1700 feet
- Entrances: 2

Cherokee Bluff Cave is a cave in Knox County, Tennessee. It contains 1700 feet of surveyed passage. The property is owned by the City of Knoxville. Though a rumor persists that the cave runs under the river, this has been disproven several times, and has been published on several times, including Berlin C. Moneymaker's masters thesis in 1929, and others in 1958. The cave was mined for saltpeter, and was evaluated as a nuclear shelter in the 1960s.
