= Forbidden Caverns =

Caverns in Tennessee, United States

Coordinates: 35.9042°N 83.3468°W

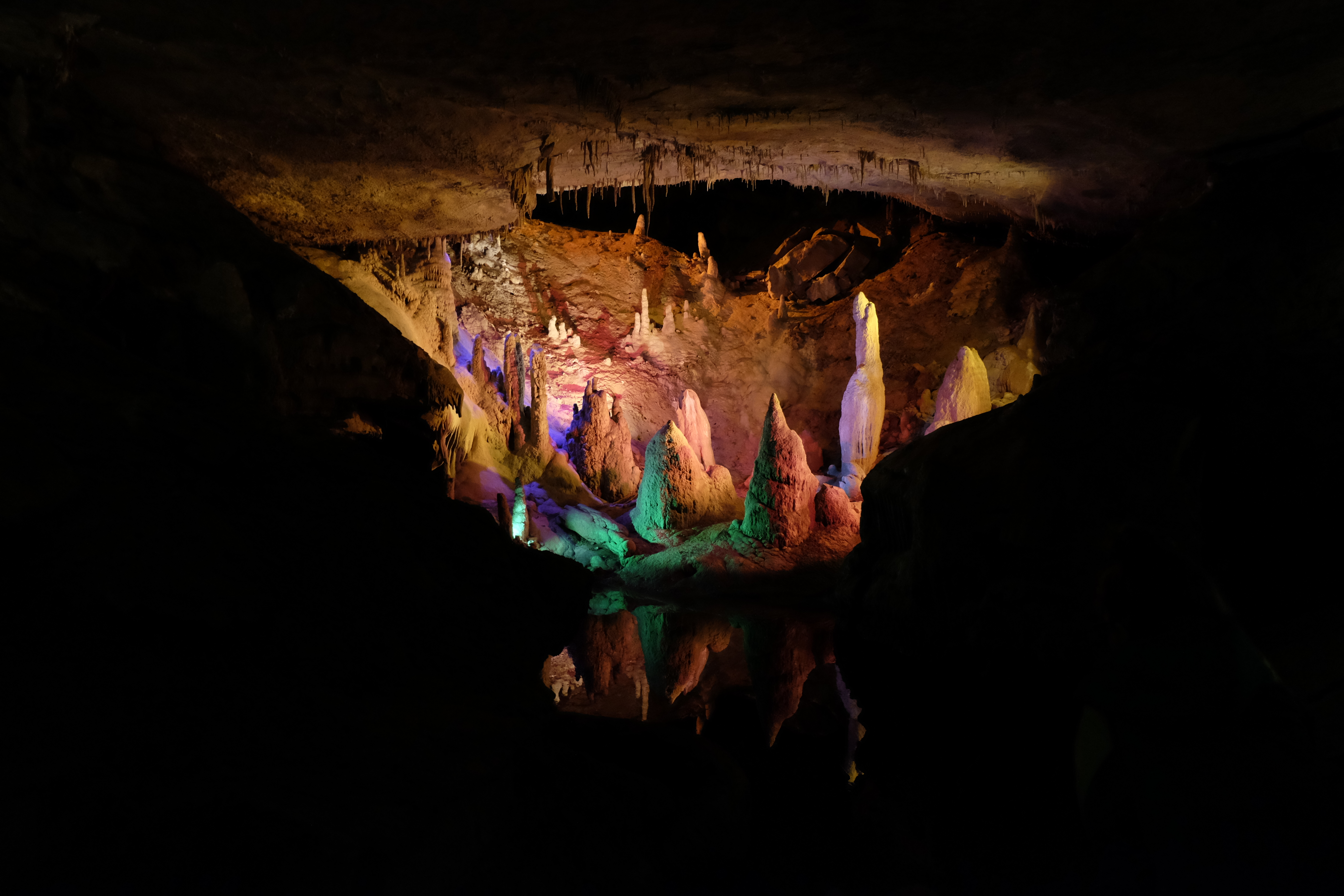
Forbidden Caverns

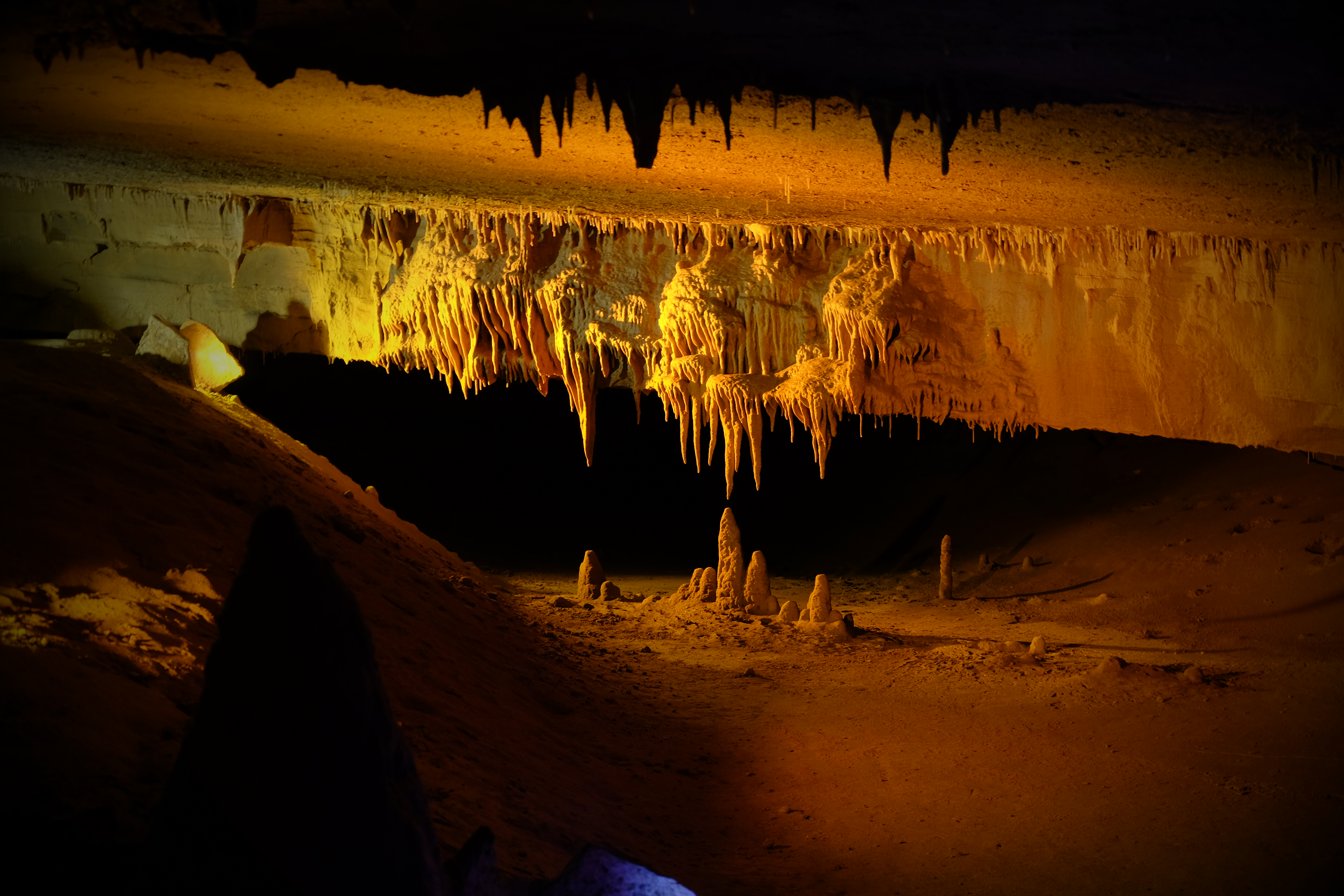
Forbidden Caverns

Forbidden Caverns is a set of caverns and tourist attraction in Sevierville, Tennessee, near the Smoky Mountains. Flint from these caverns was used by the Eastern Woodland Indians to create arrowheads, knives, and scrapers. The cave also contains a large wall of rare cave onyx. In the early twentieth century, these caverns were used to make moonshine. In the 1960s, plans began to excavate the cave as a natural attraction for the public. After 3 years of planning and development, Forbidden Caverns was opened in 1967.

The cave descends several hundred feet below the surface, where an underground river, grottos, and chimneys can be found. The underground stream is supplied by a large underground lake located beneath English Mountain. The temperature inside the caverns remains at a near-constant 58 degrees and tends to stay the same year-round.
