= Raccoon Mountain Caverns =

Cave system in Chattanooga, Tennessee

Coordinates: 35.0212°N 85.4079°W

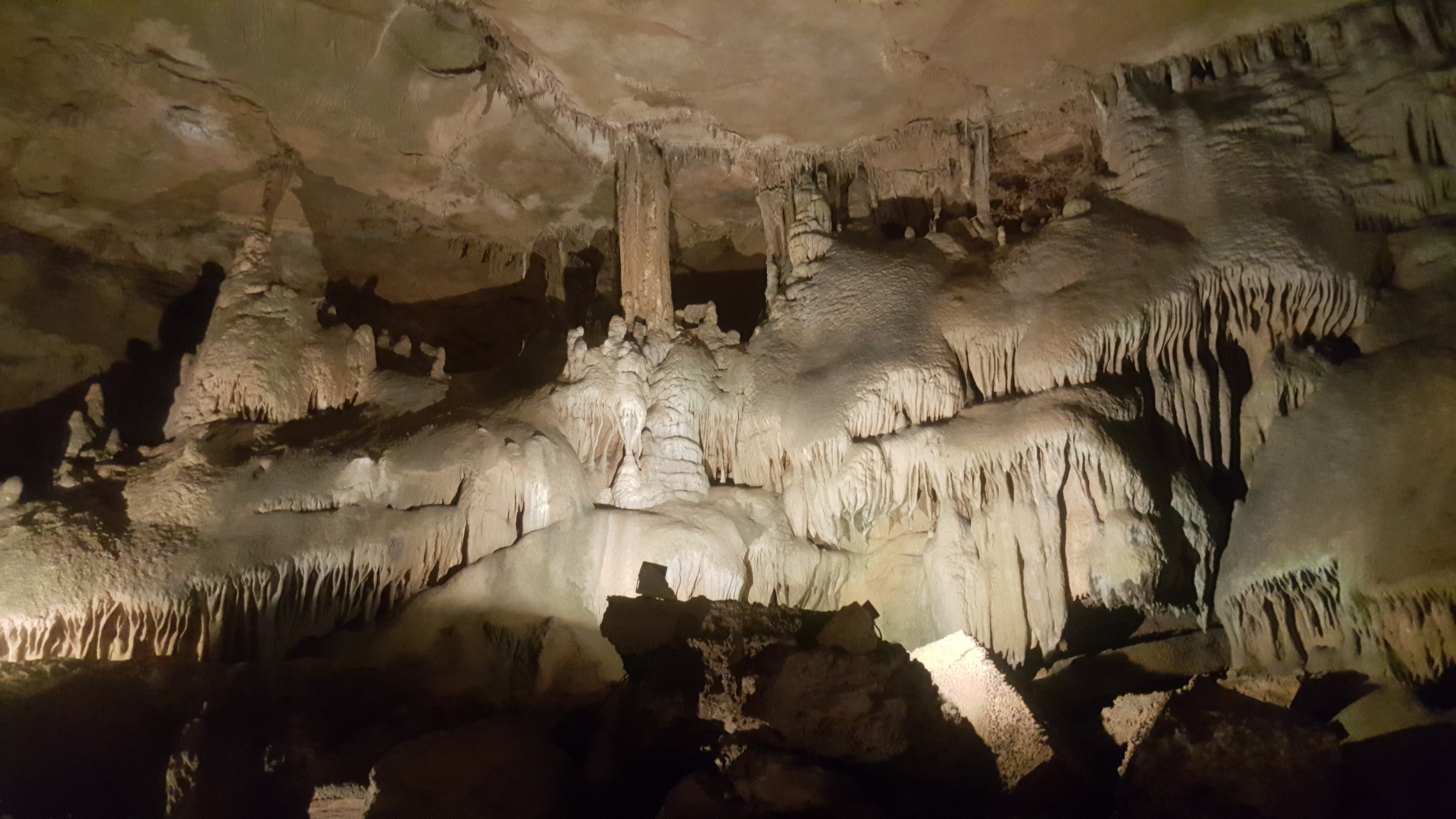
Crystal Palace Room.

Raccoon Mountain Caverns is a cave located in Chattanooga, Tennessee in a band of Mississippian Period limestone, part of the Cumberland Plateau.

== History ==
Parts of the cave system was discovered and documented as early as 1853, by 1929 Leo Lambert, a local caver who had recently discovered and opened Ruby Falls expanded the known cave passages. Prior to Lambert's arrival, the property was owned by the Grand Hotel and used as a farm for their restaurant. On hot afternoons, it was said that the farmers would relax in front of several cracks in the rock at the base of the mountain and enjoy the cool air that was blowing out. In 1929, Leo Lambert was invited to explore the source of the air. As an experienced cave explorer, Lambert realized that in order for air to blow out of a crack in limestone rock, there must be a large cave beyond the crack to supply such a volume of air. Lambert enlarged the cracks and was rewarded by discovering several hundred feet of well-decorated cave passage in a cave that was close to U.S. Highway 41. He developed a series of trails, installed electric lights, and opened the cave to the public as "Tennessee Caverns" on June 28, 1931.

The original tour, now known as the Lambert Tour, circled the Crystal Palace Room which was believed to be the largest room in the cave. Some twenty years after its opening, the Smith Brothers were managing the cave and discovered a small hole just off the Crystal Palace Room. The opening pinched down to 7.5 inches, so tight that the explorers had to exhale so they could squeeze through the gap. Less than twenty feet later, they found that the passage opened into a larger room and continued their discoveries. Eventually, they were able to enlarge the tour to include these newly discovered areas. Today, this ~0.5 mile loop tour is known as The Crystal Palace Tour. Spelunking tours known as Wild Cave Expeditions, were added in the 1970s, allowing visitors to visit the undeveloped areas of the cave beyond the commercial section. To date, over 5.5 miles of passageway has been discovered and mapped, with new discoveries still being made.

Over the years, the name of the cave was changed from Tennessee Caverns to Crystal City Caves to Crystal Caverns and eventually to its current name, Raccoon Mountain Caverns in the late 1970s. Today, the property is also home to a campground with full service RV sites, water and electric sites, primitive tent sites, and cabins.

In 2013, the owners of the caverns complained about the chlorinated herbicide Silvex found in the caverns' water and originating from a construction area on Aetna Mountain Road.

Raccoon Mountain Caverns is a major tourist attraction and is one of two caves in the Chattanooga/Hamilton County area that is open to the public.

== Description ==
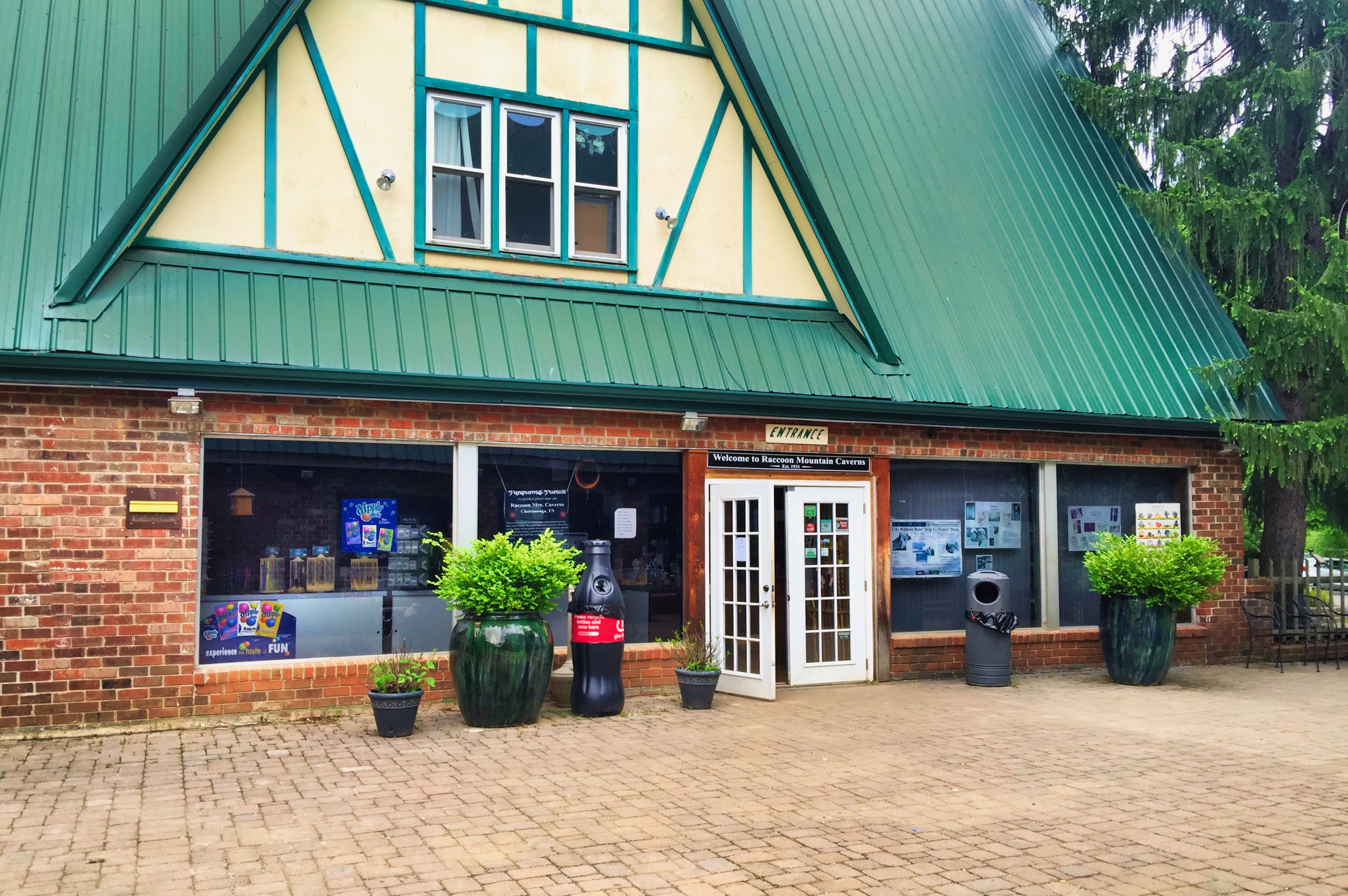
The Raccoon Mountain Caverns entrance.

The cave is known for its high level of active speleothem growth, fossils, and resident wildlife. In addition to several salamander species, the cave is home to a unique spider species referred to as the Crystal Caverns Cave Spider (Nesticus furtivus). This species, discovered initially in 1938, and officially described in 1984, is only known to exist within Raccoon Mountain Caverns.

The caverns were owned by Dr. Steven Perlaky since 1995. Perlaky donated the Racoon Mountain Caverns to the University of Tennessee at Chattanooga in 2024.
