= Chilhowee Mountain =

Two non-contiguous ridges in Tennessee, U.S.

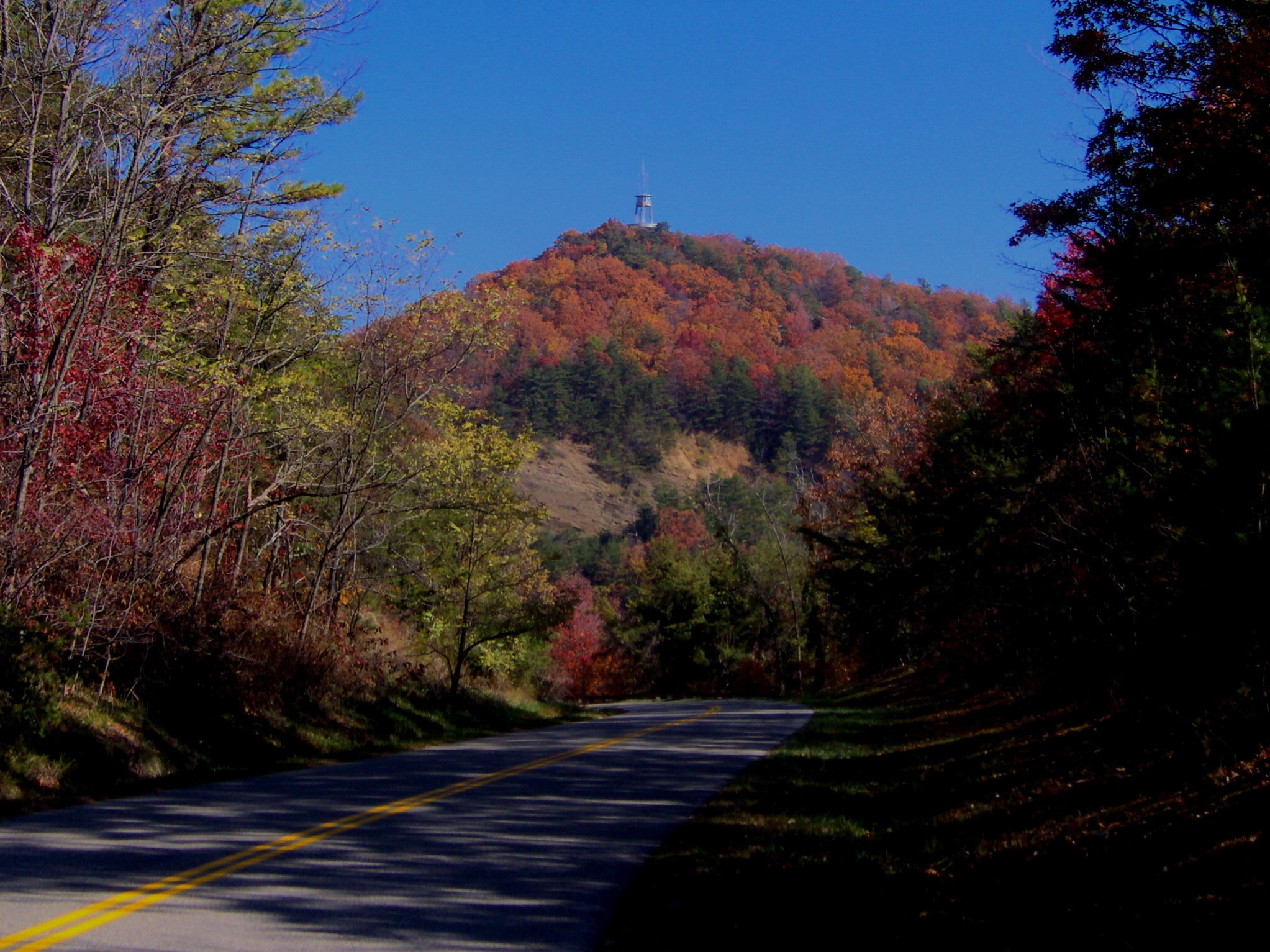
- Foothills Parkway approaching Look Rock, on the crest of Chilhowee Mountain

Highest point
- Elevation: 2,843 ft (867 m)
- Coordinates: 35°43′50″N 83°49′12″W

Geography
- Location: Blount County, Tennessee, U.S.
- Parent range: Great Smoky Mountains
- Topo map: USGS Kinzel Springs (TN)

Chilhowee Mountain is the name of two non-contiguous ridges in the U.S. state of Tennessee. The ridges run in a northeastern to southwestern direction. The northern section is at the outer edge of the Great Smoky Mountains, stretching from the Little Pigeon River watershed at the northeast to the Little Tennessee River and Chilhowee Dam to the southwest. The southern section runs from Tellico Plains to the Ocoee River in Polk County. The northern section is traversed by the Foothills Parkway from Walland to its terminus near Chilhowee.

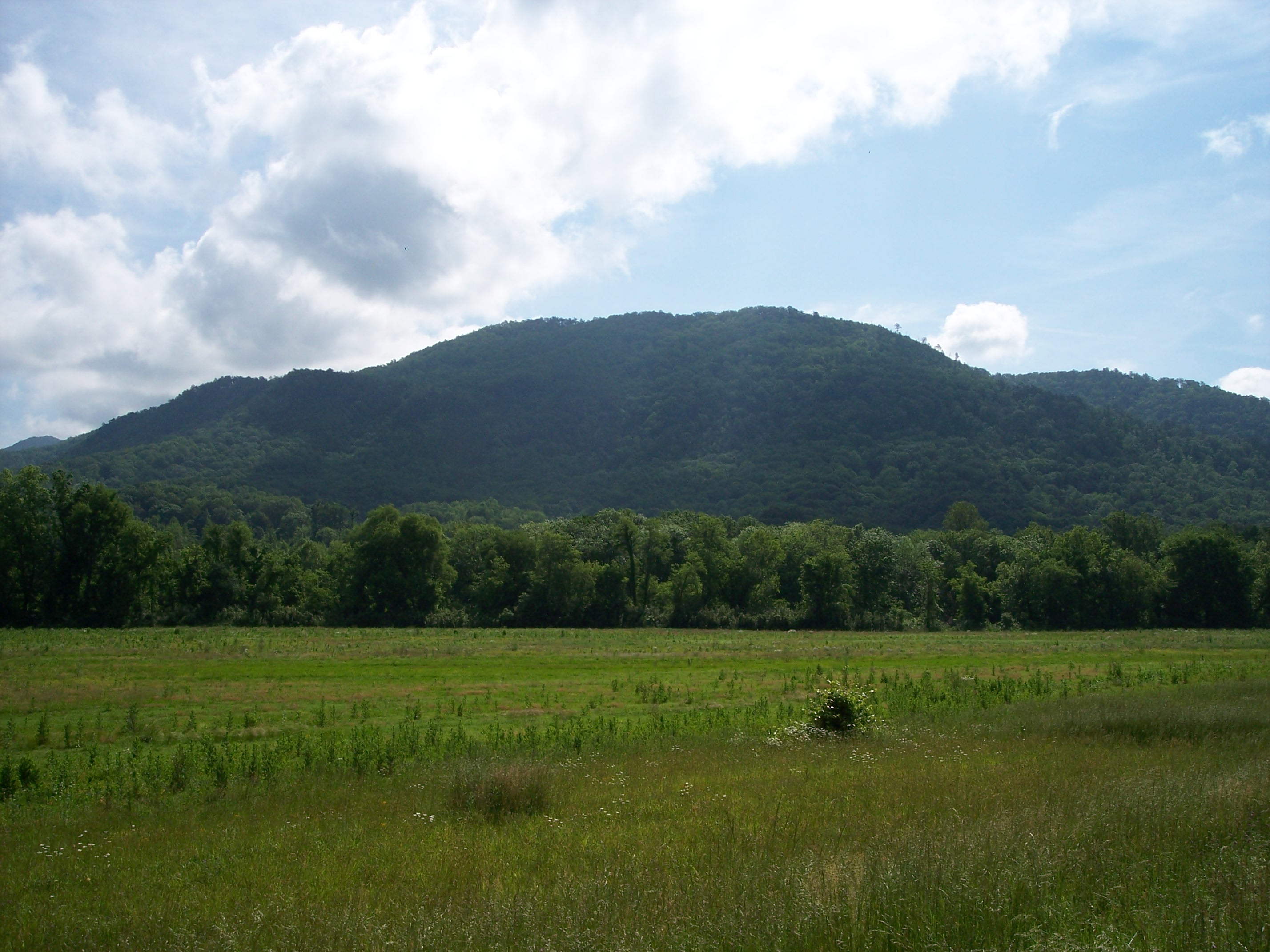
Part of the northeastern portion of Chilhowee Mountain where the Little River forms a gap separating the mountain into two halves

== Background ==
While the northern ridge is 35 miles (56 km) long, it rarely reaches a width of more than 3 miles (4.8 km) or 4 miles (6.4 km). Little River cuts a large gap in the middle of the mountain (near Walland), dividing it into northeastern and southwestern sections. The highest point on the southwestern section is 2,650 ft (808 m) at a knob known as Look Rock. The highest point on the northeastern section, known as The Three Sisters, rises to 2,843 ft (867 m), and is visible from nearby Maryville, Tennessee.

The southern ridge is about 15 miles (24 km) long and sits entirely within the Cherokee National Forest. The Ocoee River passes along its southwestern base, along with the Ocoee Scenic Byway, part of U.S. Route 64. The mountain is separated from Oswald Dome to the north by a saddle, although both are technically part of the same ridge. The highest point on this section is 2,618 feet (798 m). The mountain is accessible from US 64 via a paved forest service road, which contains multiple overlooks. A campground with an artificial lake, operated by the Forest Service, is located atop the mountain. Benton Falls is a waterfall on the eastern escarpment of the mountain and is accessible via a trail that begins at the campground.

=== Name ===
Chilhowee Mountain derives its name from Chilhowee, a Cherokee village in the 18th century. The etymology of the Cherokee name is unclear, and may be derived from the Muscogean name Chalahume, an earlier Creek name for the village. In English it has also been written "Chilhoe".

== Notes and references ==
- Coggins, Allen (1999) [1999]. Place Names of the Smokies. Great Smoky Mtns Natural History Assn. ISBN 978-0937207239.
