= Nesticus furtivus =

Scientific classification
- Domain: Eukaryota
- Kingdom: Animalia
- Phylum: Arthropoda
- Subphylum: Chelicerata
- Class: Arachnida
- Order: Araneae
- Infraorder: Araneomorphae
- Family: Nesticidae
- Genus: Nesticus
- Species: N. furtivus

Binomial name
- Nesticus furtivus Gertsch, 1984

Species of spider

Nesticus furtivus, the Crystal Caverns cave spider, is a species of true spider in the family Nesticidae. It is found only in Raccoon Mountain Caverns, formerly Crystal Caverns, a commercial cave in Chattanooga, Tennessee, United States.
