= Tuckaleechee Caverns =

Caverns in eastern Tennessee, United States

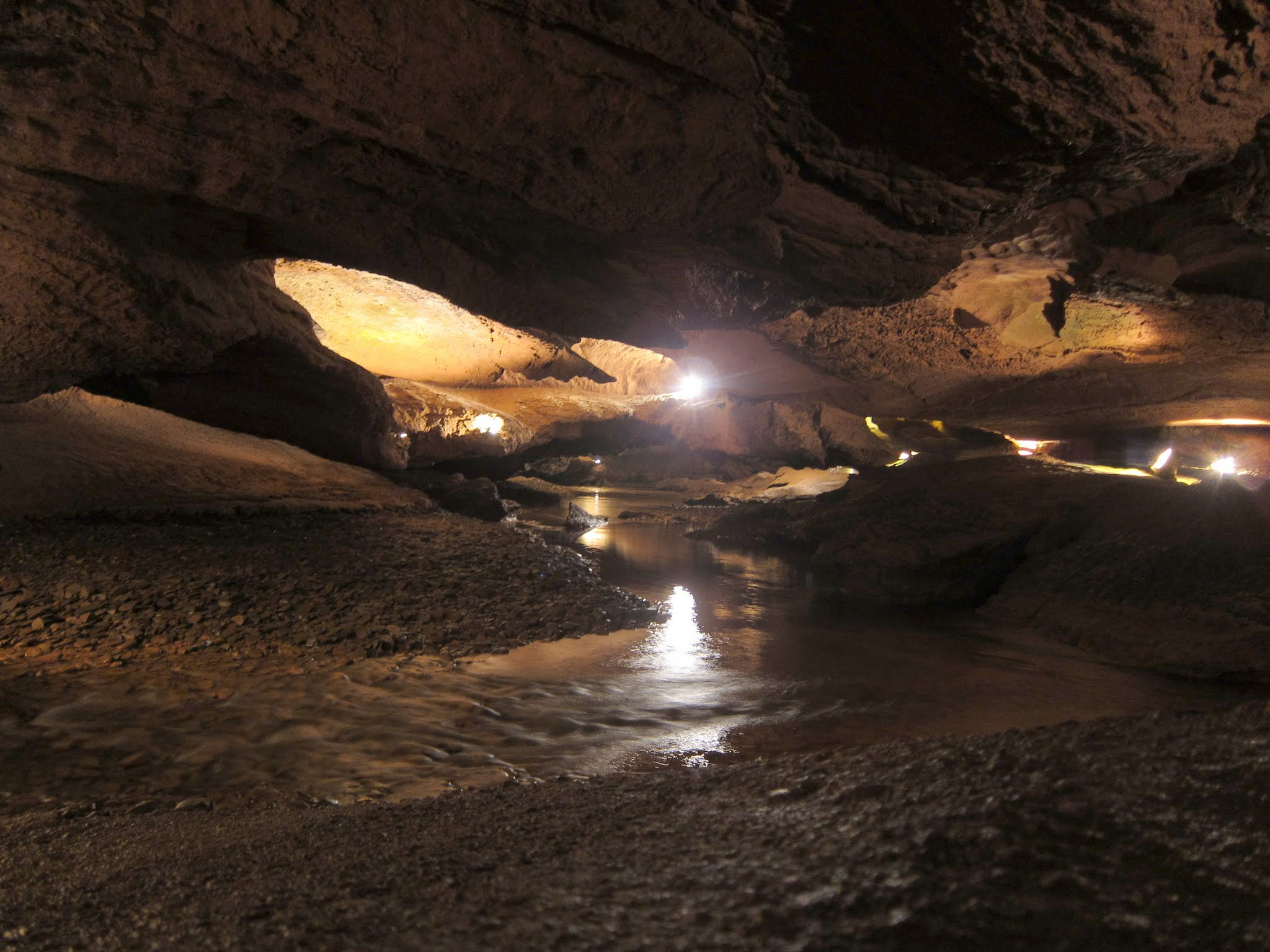
Some rock formations in the Tuckaleechee Caverns

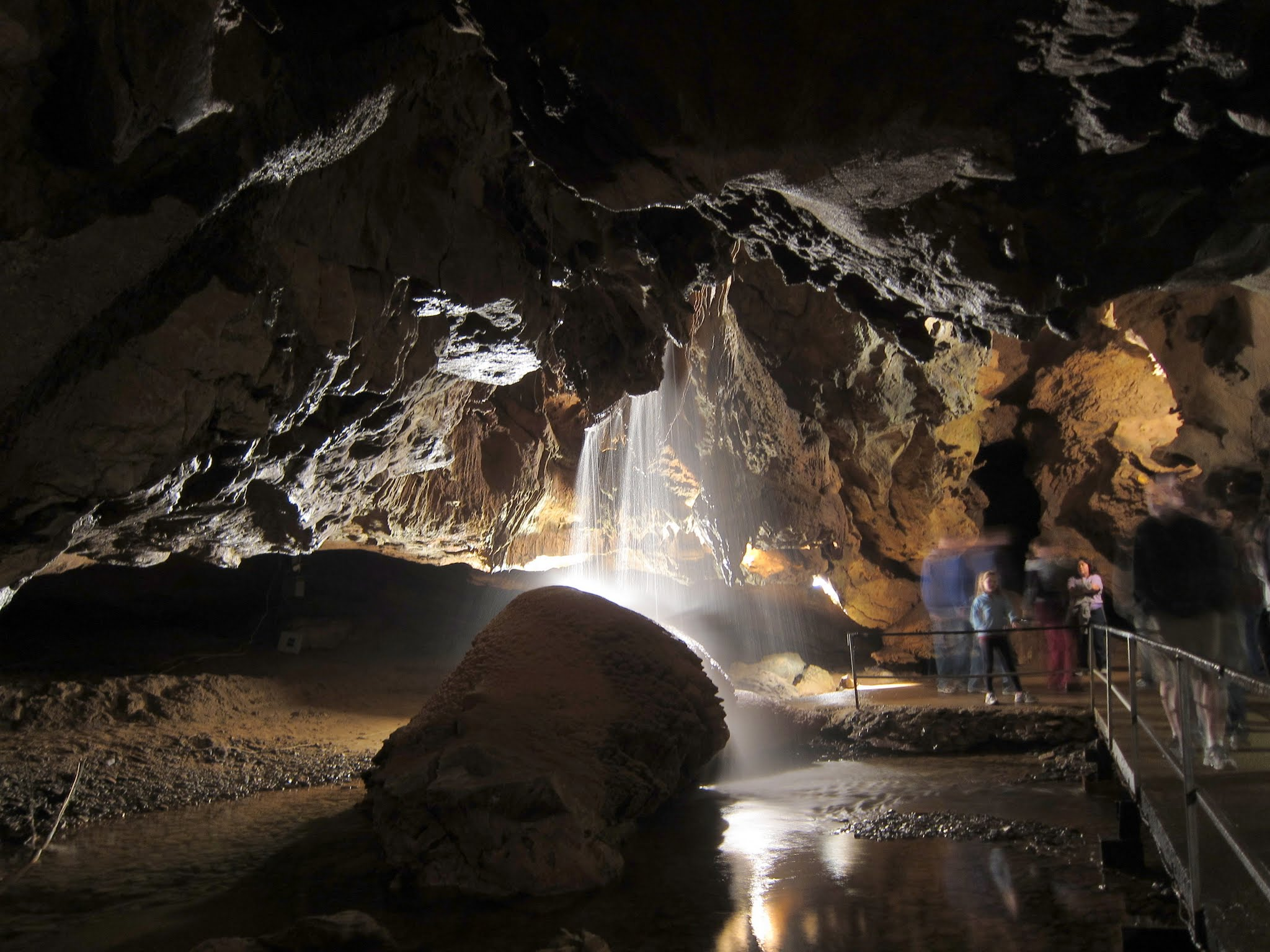
Silver Falls, the underground waterfall within the Tuckaleechee Caverns

The Tuckaleechee Caverns (pronounced as /ˌtʌk.ə.ˈliː.tʃiː ˈkæv.ərns/, TUCK-ə-LEE-chee KAV-erns) is a tourist attraction and the largest and highest rated cave or cavern by the AAA east of the Mississippi River. The caverns run under the Great Smoky Mountains National Park, and have an opening in Townsend, Tennessee.

== History ==
The Tuckaleechee Caverns were first used by the Cherokees in the 17th and 18th century, but they were re-discovered in the mid-19th century by sawmill employees in the area. The caverns were opened for tours in 1931 by Earl McCampbell, but the business shut down after one year due to the economic impacts of the Great Depression. The caverns were re-opened to the public by Townsend locals Bill Vananda and Harry Myers in 1953. The first tours after the re-opening were taken by kerosene lamps until electricity was wired through the caverns in 1955.

== Features ==
The Tuckaleechee Caverns are known for the "Big Room"; it is a cave chamber that can almost fit an entire football field inside it. The "Big Room" has many stalagmites, some of which reaching 24 feet (7.3 m) tall, and flow-stone formations hundreds of feet in length and width. Another large room exists beyond the "Big Room", but is not opened for tours as part of the cavern would have to be destroyed in order to make it accessible to the public. In the 1980s, the Myers sold their shares of the business to the Vanandas, who have operated the caverns since.

The Tuckaleechee Caverns also has a 210-foot (64 m) two-tier underground waterfall named "Silver Falls". The caverns originate at White Oak Sinks in the Great Smoky Mountains National Park.

=== SeismicTKL ===
The caverns also host SeismicTKL, a seismograph system monitored by the United States Department of Defense and the United States Geological Survey. SeismicTKL is the most sensitive seismograph system on Earth.
