= Ruby Falls =

Cave with underground waterfall in Tennessee, United States

- Lookout Mountain Caverns and Cavern Castle
- U.S. National Register of Historic Places
- U.S. Historic district
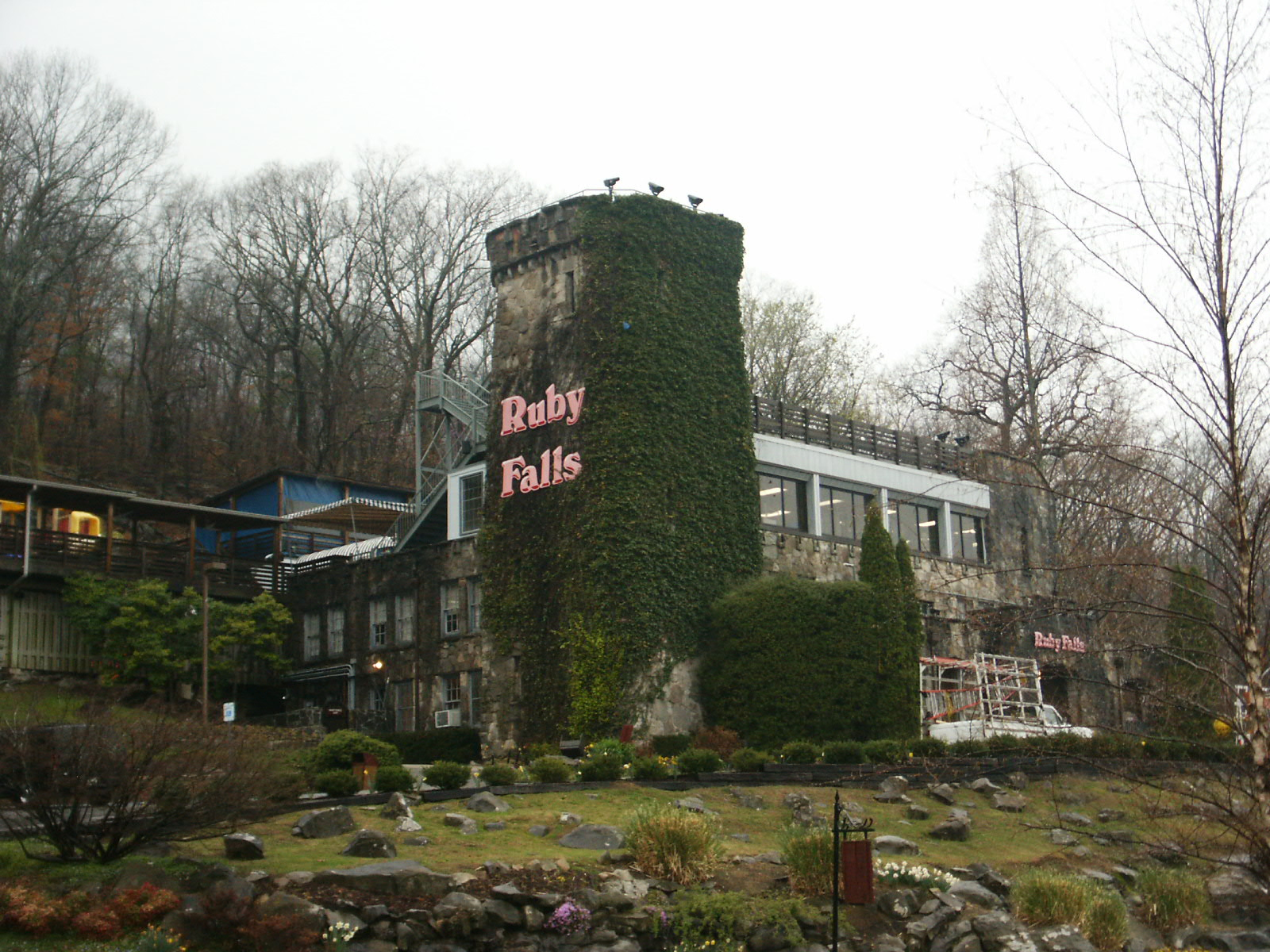
- Ruby Falls' Visitors Center (Cavern Castle)

- Location within Tennessee Location within the United States
- Location: Scenic Hwy., Chattanooga, Tennessee
- Coordinates: 35°1′9″N 85°20′22″W
- Area: 10 acres (4.0 ha)
- Built: 1929
- Architect: Lambert, Leo B.; Brown Contracting Co.
- NRHP reference No.: 85002969
- Added to NRHP: November 26, 1985

Ruby Falls is a 85 feet (26 m) tall waterfall in Ruby Falls Cave of Lookout Mountain, in Chattanooga, Tennessee, United States. The cave is commercialized with electric lights, paved foot trails, and an elevator for access. The waterfall may only be visited by guided tour.

== Geology ==
About 300 to 360 million years ago (in the Carboniferous Period, at the end of the Paleozoic Era), the eastern Tennessee area was covered with a shallow sea, the sediments of which eventually formed limestone rock. About 200 million years ago, this area was uplifted, forming Lookout Mountain and nearby ridges. Slightly acidic groundwater running through cracks in the limestone slowly dissolved the relatively soluble rock, causing narrow cracks to widen into passages. This process, called chemical weathering, caused various caves to form inside Lookout Mountain.

Among them were Lookout Mountain Cave, which had a natural entrance that opened to the surface, and Ruby Falls Cave, which did not. The two were unconnected until developers joined them to create Lookout Mountain Caverns. Ruby Falls Cave is the upper of the two and contains a variety of geological formations and curiosities that Lookout Mountain Cave does not have.

Ruby Falls Cave features many of the more well-known types of cave formations (or speleothems) including stalactites and stalagmites, columns, drapery, and flowstone.

The Falls are located at the end of the main passage of Ruby Falls Cave, in a vertical shaft called a dome/pit. The underground waterfall and stream is fed by meteoric water (e.g. rainwater) that percolates into the cave from the surface. It collects in a pool in the cave floor and then continues through the mountain, through a second deeper pit, and finally resurges as a natural spring to the Tennessee River at the base of Lookout Mountain. Like all caves in the region, the waterfall is naturally seasonally dependent and would be dry during certain times of the year. However, water is artificially circulated via pumps to maintain water flow year-round.

== History ==
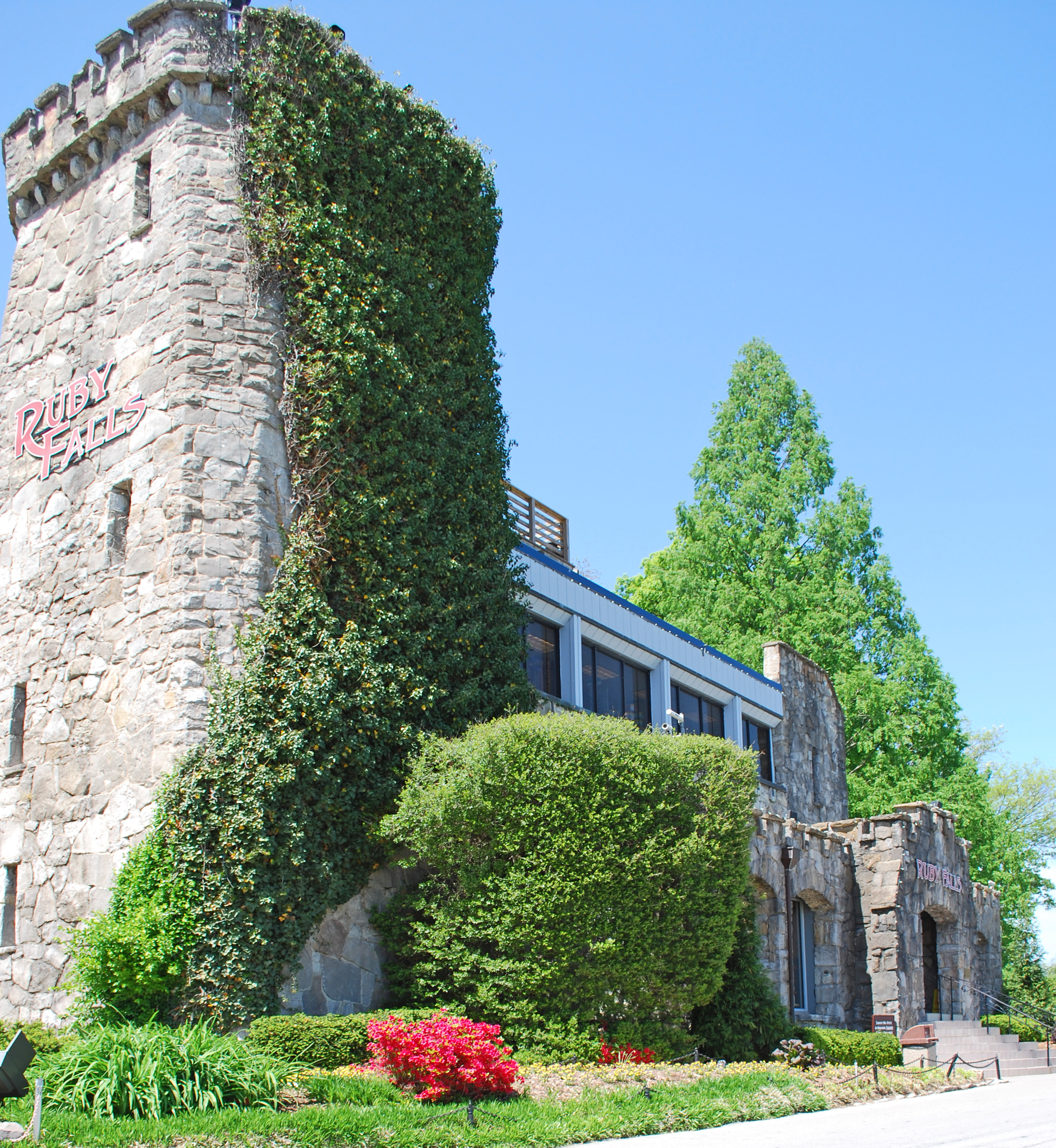
Lookout Mountain Castle

Ruby Falls Cave was discovered in 1928. The cave had no known natural entrances and thus it lacked the artifacts sometimes associated with caves in the southeastern United States.

In 1905, the natural entrance to the neighboring Lookout Mountain Cave was closed during the construction of a railway tunnel. In the 1920s, a chemist and cave enthusiast named Leo Lambert thought that he could re-open the cave as a tourist attraction, and formed a company to do so. He planned to make an opening farther up the mountain than the original opening and transport tourists to the cave via an elevator. For this purpose, his company purchased land on the side of Lookout Mountain above Lookout Mountain Cave and in 1928 began to drill through the limestone. In doing so, they discovered a small passageway about 18 inches (0.46 m) high and 4 feet (1.2 m) wide. Exploring this opening, Lambert discovered the never-before-seen underground waterfall. On his next trip to visit the cave, Lambert took his wife Ruby, and told her that he would name the falls after her.

After the discovery of Ruby Falls Caves, the tunnelers kept digging to locate the original cave they were searching for, the Lookout Mountain caverns, which they reached after approximately 200 feet (61 m) of tunneling (1,120 feet (340 m) below the summit of the mountain). On December 30, 1929 the Lookout Mountain caverns were open to the public, and by the following year in June the Ruby Falls cave was expanded and opened as well. By 1935 the lower of the two caves was blocked off due to Ruby Falls being the far more popular of the two caves.

In 1954, the pathway around the basin was cut in order to allow tourists a better view of the falls. This began the tour-related quip regarding not drinking the falls' water. Though pure and thus safe to drink, it has large concentrations of magnesium from the strata of the mountain, which makes it a natural laxative.

In 1975, the secondary exit from the falls to the base of the mountain was cut. This was to comply with recreation regulations in Tennessee. The secondary exit is used in the event that the main shaft elevator fails. This secondary exit was used for the popular Ruby Falls Haunted Cavern until 2017 when the event was renamed Dread Hollow and was moved to a new location. The haunted attraction occurs in a commercial space at a shopping center (not at the caverns) and is held from late September through October.

In April 2007, the National Speleological Society (NSS) published "Caves of Chattanooga" by Larry E. Matthews. Chapter 3, "Ruby Falls Cave", covers the history of Ruby Falls Cave from its discovery in 1928 through 2007 (includes 23 illustrations). Chapter 1, "Lookout Mountain Cave", covers the cave Leo Lambert was drilling for when he accidentally discovered Ruby Falls Cave.

== Tourism and advertising ==
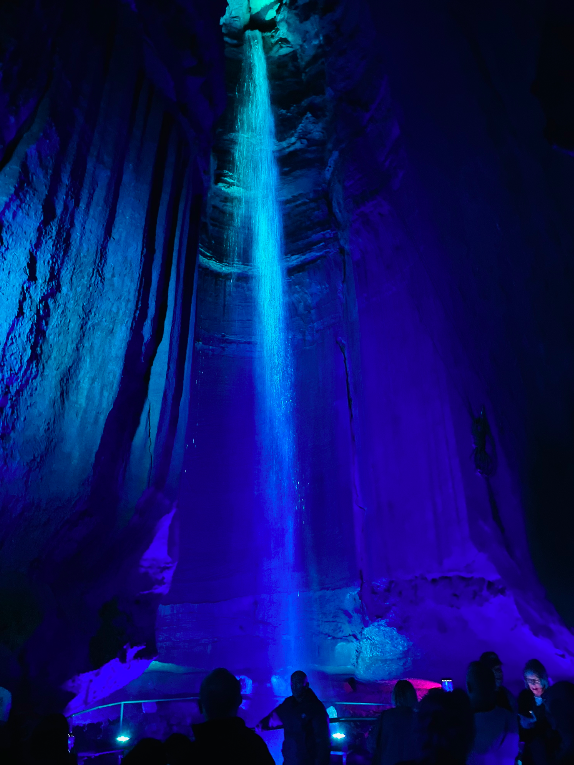
Ruby Falls, the deepest underground waterfall in a commercialized cave in the United States

Lambert decided to open both caves to the public, although Lookout Mountain Cave was closed in 1935 since it was not as popular with tourists due to the excessive coal ash polluting the cave from the nearby trains, which caused thick black soot to accumulate on all surfaces of the cave. Public tours at Ruby Falls Cave began in 1930. Electric lights were installed in the cave, making it one of the first commercial caves to be so outfitted. A large number of billboards were placed along I-75 in the 1970s and 1980s with the words "SEE RUBY FALLS" beginning hundreds of miles north and south of the falls itself. Ruby Falls remains a staple of Chattanooga tourism, operating daily.

Ruby Falls and the larger Lookout Mountain Caverns complex have been designated a National Historic Landmark. It is often associated with the nearby Rock City attraction, which lies atop Lookout Mountain.

== Popular culture references ==
Johnny Cash and Roy Orbison co-wrote a song with the title "See Ruby Fall" in the mid to late 1960s, a reference to the barn roof advertising slogan "See Ruby Falls" ubiquitous throughout the southern United States in the mid 20th Century.

== See also ==
- Cloudland Canyon State Park
- List of waterfalls
