= List of caves in the United States =

This is a list of natural caves in the United States.

== Alabama ==
- Cathedral Caverns
- Crystal Cavern
- DeSoto Caverns
- Dust Cave
- Fern Cave
- Manitou Cave
- Rickwood Caverns
- Russell Cave
- Sauta Cave
- Shelta Cave

== Alaska ==
- On Your Knees Cave
- Trail Creek Caves

== Arizona ==
- Antelope Cave
- Bat Cave mine
- Cave of the Bells
- Colossal Cave
- Coronado Cave
- Grand Canyon Caverns
- Kartchner Caverns
- Lava River Cave
- Onyx Cave
- Peppersauce Cave
- Skeleton Cave
- Ventana Cave

== Arkansas ==
- Blanchard Springs Caverns
- Bull Shoals Caverns
- Cosmic Cavern
- Fitton Cave
- Logan Cave
- Crystal Dome Cavern
- Mystic Caverns
- Old Spanish Treasure Cave
- Onyx Cave
- Wonderland Cave

== California ==
- Black Chasm Cavern
- Boyden Cave
- Burro Flats Painted Cave
- California Caverns
- Chumash Painted Cave
- Crystal Cave
- Hall City Cave
- Infernal Caverns
- Lake Shasta Caverns
- Lava Beds National Monument
- Mercer Caverns
- Mitchell Caverns
- Moaning Cavern
- Mud Caves
- Ursa Minor

== Colorado ==
- Cave of the Winds
- Glenwood Caverns
- Mantle's Cave
- Spring Cave

== Connecticut ==
- Tory Cave

== Delaware ==
- Beaver Valley Rock Shelter Site

== Florida ==
- Devil's Den Cave
- Florida Caverns State Park
- Leon Sinks cave system
- Wakulla cave
- Warren's Cave

== Georgia ==
- Ellison's Cave
- Kingston Saltpeter Cave
- Pettyjohn Cave

== Hawaii ==
- Bobcat Trail Habitation Cave
- Fern Grotto
- Kaumana Cave
- Kazumura Cave
- Makauwahi Cave

== Idaho ==
- Craters of the Moon National Monument and Preserve
- Kuna Caves
- Minnetonka Cave
- Niter Ice Cave
- Wilson Butte Cave

== Illinois ==
- Cave-in-Rock
- Illinois Caverns

== Indiana ==
- Bluespring Caverns
- Buckner Cave
- Indian Caverns
- Marengo Cave
- Shawnee Cave
- Siberts Cave
- Squire Boone Caverns
- Twin Caves
- Wyandotte Cave

== Iowa ==
- Cold Water Cave
- Decorah Ice Cave
- Maquoketa Caves
- Spook Cave

== Kentucky ==
- Bat Cave
- Carter Caves State Park
- Cascade Caverns
- Colossal Cavern
- Diamond Caverns
- Eleven Jones Cave
- Fisher Ridge Cave System
- Glover's Cave
- Goochland Cave
- Great Onyx Cave
- Great Saltpetre Cave
- Horse Cave also known as "Hidden River Cave"
- Lost River Cave
- Mammoth Cave
- Martin Ridge Cave System
- Oligo-Nunk Cave System

== Maryland ==
- Crystal Grottoes
- Cumberland Bone Cave

== Massachusetts ==
- Horse Caves
- King Phillip's Cave

== Michigan ==
- Devil's Kitchen
- Pellerito Cave
- Hendrie River Water Cave
- Skull Cave

== Minnesota ==
- Cold Water Spring State Preserve
- Forestville Mystery Cave State Park
- Niagara Cave, Harmony
- Spring Valley Caverns
- Tyson Spring Cave

== Missouri ==
- Bluff Dweller's Cave
- Bridal Cave
- Caves of St. Louis
- Cliff Cave
- Current River Cavern
- Devils Well
- Fantastic Caverns
- Graham Cave
- Jacobs Cavern
- Mark Twain Cave
- Marvel Cave
- Meramec Caverns
- Onondaga Cave State Park
- Onyx Cave
- Ozark Caverns
- Research Cave
- Riverbluff Cave
- Talking Rocks Cavern

== Montana ==
- Lewis and Clark Caverns
- Pictograph Cave
- Tears of the Turtle Cave

== Nevada ==
- Devils Hole
- Gypsum Cave
- Hidden Cave
- Humboldt Cave
- Lehman Caves
- Lovelock Cave
- Toquima Cave

== New Hampshire ==
- Batcheller's Cave
- Lost River Reservation
- Polar Caves

== New Mexico ==
- Bandera Volcano Ice Cave
- Burnet Cave
- Carlsbad Caverns
- Conkling Cavern
- El Malpais National Monument
- Fox Cave
- Lechuguilla Cave
- Pendejo Cave
- Sandia Cave
- Shelter Cave
- Snowy River Cave

== New York ==
- Cave of the Winds
- Clarksville Cave
- Ellenville Fault Ice Caves
- Howe Caverns
- Lockport Cave
- Schroeder's Pants Cave
- Secret Caverns
- Stone Bridge Cave
- Tory Cave

== North Carolina ==
- Boone's Cave
- Linville Caverns

== Ohio ==
- Crystal Cave
- Mary Campbell Cave
- Ohio Caverns
- Olentangy Indian Caverns
- Seneca Caverns
- Zane Shawnee Caverns

== Oklahoma ==
- Alabaster Caverns
- Robbers Cave

== Oregon ==
- Arnold Lava Tube System
- Boyd Cave
- Derrick Cave
- Fort Rock Cave
- Horse Lava Tube System
- Lava River Cave
- Oregon Caves National Monument
- Paisley Caves
- Redmond Caves
- Sandy Glacier Caves
- Sea Lion Caves
- Skeleton Cave
- Skylight Cave

== Pennsylvania ==
- Crystal Cave
- Dragon Cave
- Indian Caverns
- Indian Echo Caverns
- Laurel Caverns
- Lost River Caverns
- Penns Cave
- Port Kennedy Bone Cave
- Tytoona Cave

== South Dakota ==
- Jewel Cave
- Rushmore Cave
- Sitting Bull Crystal Caverns
- Wind Cave

== Tennessee ==
- Bell Witch Cave
- Blue Spring Cave
- Big Bone Cave
- Bristol Caverns
- Craighead Caverns - also called Lost Sea
- Cumberland Caverns
- Devilstep Hollow Cave
- Dunbar Cave
- Forbidden Caverns
- Hubbard's Cave
- Lookout Mountain Caverns
- Lost Cove Cave
- Nickajack Cave
- Raccoon Mountain Caverns
- Rumbling Falls Cave
- Ruby Falls
- Snail Shell Cave
- Tuckaleechee Caverns
- Worley's Cave

== Texas ==
- Airmen's Cave
- Baker Cave
- Bracken Cave
- Cascade Caverns
- Cave Without a Name
- Caverns of Sonora
- Inner Space Cavern
- Jacob's Well
- Kickapoo Cavern
- Longhorn Cavern
- Natural Bridge Caverns
- Rock Dove Cave
- Spring Creek Cave
- Wonder Cave

== Utah ==
- Bechan Cave
- Blowhole Cave
- Danger Cave
- Hogup Cave
- Mammoth Cave
- Moqui Cave
- Neff's Cave
- Nutty Putty Cave
- Timpanogos Cave

== Vermont ==
- Aeolus Cave
- Tory's Cave

== Virginia ==
- Bull Thistle Cave
- The Caverns at Natural Bridge
- Clarks Cave
- Dixie Caverns
- Endless Caverns
- Gap Cave
- Grand Caverns, formerly "Weyer's cave"
- Indian Jim's Cave
- Luray Caverns
- Melrose Caverns
- Natural Tunnel
- Ogdens Cave
- Shenandoah Caverns
- Skyline Caverns
- Stay High Cave
- Unthanks Cave

== Washington ==
- Ape Cave
- Big Four Ice Caves
- Cheese Cave
- Gardner Cave
- Marmes Rockshelter
- Paradise Ice Caves

== West Virginia ==
- Buckeye Creek Cave
- Cass Cave
- Charles Town Cave
- Friars Hole Cave System
- Haynes Cave
- Hellhole
- Lost World Caverns
- Organ Cave
- Seneca Caverns
- Sinks of Gandy
- Smoke Hole Caverns

== Wisconsin ==
- Cave of the Mounds
- Cherney Maribel Caves
- Crystal Cave
- Eagle Cave
- Ledge View Nature Center
- Samuels' Cave
- St. John Mine
- Tainter Cave

== Wyoming ==
- Natural Trap Cave
- Shoshone Cavern National Monument
- Tongue River Cave

== See also ==
- List of caves
- List of longest caves in the United States
- Speleology
