= Fitton Cave =

Longest known cave in Arkansas, USA

- Beauty Cave
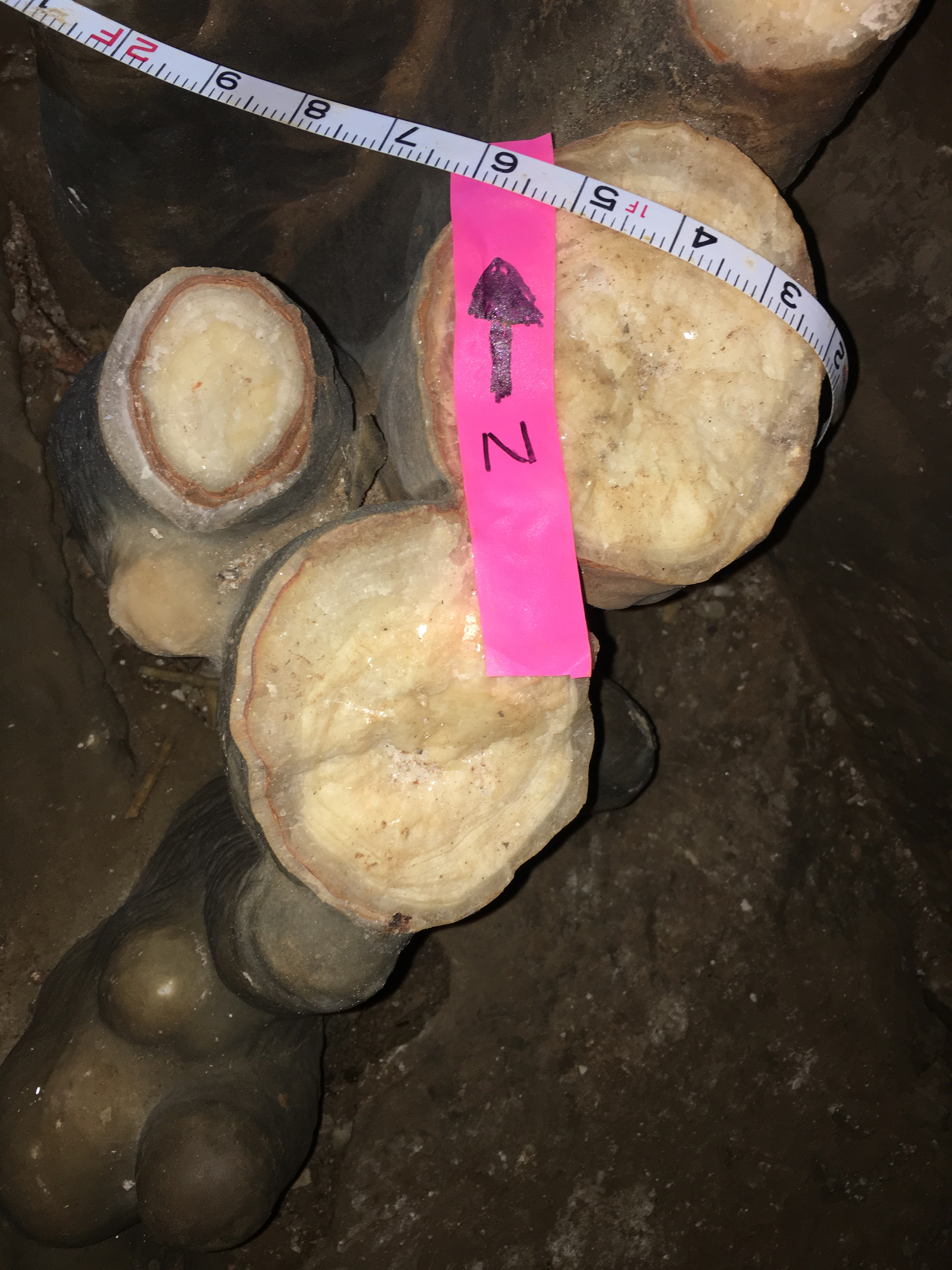
- Broken stalagmites in Fitton Cave
- Interactive map of Fitton Cave
- Location: Newton County, Arkansas
- Coordinates: 36.0881°N 93.2327°W
- Depth: 313 feet (95 m)
- Length: 17.5 miles (28.2 km)
- Height variation: 390 feet (120 m)
- Elevation: 6,825 feet (2,080 m)
- Geology: Limestone
- Difficulty: Difficult
- Hazards: White-nose syndrome
- Access: Permit only

Fitton Cave, also known as Beauty Cave, is located near the Buffalo National River in Arkansas, United States. According to Robert Gulden's cave database, it contains 17.5 miles (28.2 km) of mapped passage as of 2024, and is the longest known cave in Arkansas, and the 188th longest in the world. The cliffs on the Buffalo River harbor 340 known caves, many of which are home to endangered bats. Fitton Cave is gated and access is closely monitored by the National Park Service, due to the spread of white-nose syndrome, a fungal disease that affects bats.

== History ==
The cave was first explored by Europeans in the 1940s.

In 1976, a mapping project was started by the Cave Research Foundation. The survey started as a species survey, which eventually evolved into a mapping effort.

In 2008, a grant was provided by the National Speleological Society to study the water within the cave.

The cave was closed to the public in 2009.

In August 2020, the cave gate was forced open by vandals, who stole or destroyed several cave formations, including draperies and stalagmites. These formations, which form over thousands of years, are irreplaceable on a human time scale, and as such the loss is of tremendous cultural importance. The culprits could face up to 10 years in prison for the vandalism, which occurred in violation of the Cave Protection Act of 1988.

== Biology ==
In 2006, the cave contained at least 58 species, 11 of which were cave obligates which could not live outside. This makes it "the second most biologically diverse cave in the state".

== See also ==
- List of caves
