= Crystal Caverns =

Crystal Caverns may refer to:

- Crystal Cavern, a small cave in Clay, Alabama, U.S.
- Sitting Bull Crystal Caverns, a cave complex near Rapid City, South Dakota, U.S.
- Crystal Caverns at Hupp's Hill, a former show cave near Strasburg, Virginia, U.S.
- Raccoon Mountain Caverns, a former name of Raccoon Mountain Caverns
- Crystal Caverns (video game)

== See also ==
- Crystal Cave (disambiguation)
