= Crystal Cave =

Crystal Cave may refer to:

- Crystal Cave, Bermuda
- Crystal Cave (Kentucky)
- Crystal Cave (Ohio)
- Crystal Cave (Pennsylvania)
- Crystal Cave (Sequoia National Park)
- Crystal Cave (Western Australia)
- Crystal Cave (Wisconsin)
- Cave of the Crystals (Cueva de los Cristales), Naica mine, Chihuahua, Mexico
- Crystal Cave in St. Herman's Blue Hole National Park, Belize

Other

- Crystal Caves, video game by Apogee
- The Crystal Cave, 1970 fantasy novel by Mary Stewart

== See also ==
- Crystal Caverns (disambiguation)
- Crystal Cavern
- Crystal Grottoes
- Geode
