= Millennium Park (Grand Rapids) =

Park in Grand Rapids, Michigan, USA

Coordinates: 42.940°N 85.743°W

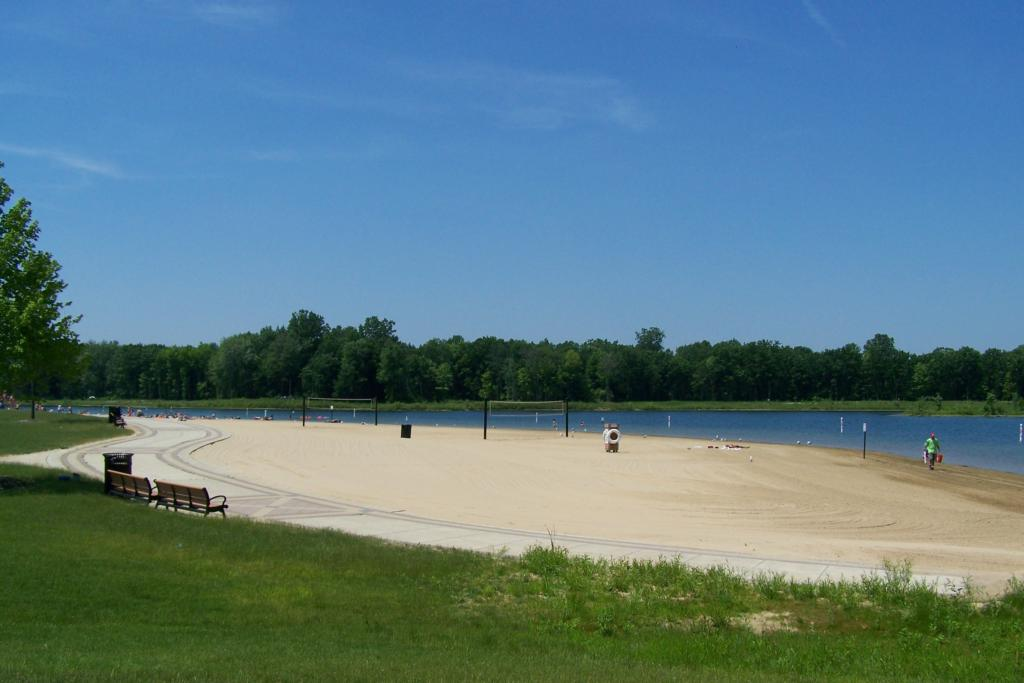
- The beach at Millennium Park
- Interactive map of Millennium Park
- Type: Public park
- Location: Grand Rapids, Michigan
- Area: 1,500-acre (6.1 km^{2})

Millennium Park is the largest urban park in West Michigan, located on the southwest side of Grand Rapids. Millennium Park connects four of the major cities in the area together, including Grand Rapids, Wyoming, Grandville, and Walker. When completed, the park will be twice as large as New York City's Central Park, at approximately 1,500 acres (6 km²).

The project began in 1998 when the Parks Department director Roger Sabine began planning for an expansion of Johnson Park. Sabine expanded the Johnson Park expansion into the 1,500 acre (6 km²) park project. The project was finally submitted to the Secchia Millennium Commission (SMC) later that year and later approved the project by which the Kent County Board of Commissioners named the park Millennium Park. The park celebrated its grand opening in July 2004.

The park is built on the former location of gypsum mines and gravel pits, including the former location of the Domtar mine. About 50 pumps continue to extract petroleum in locations across the parkland.

== Park features ==
- Beach and splashpad
- Boardwalk
- Boating center
- Fishing dock
- Picnic shelters
- Trails

== Recreational fishing ==
The park offers a unique fishing experience in an urban community. With a very short commute from downtown Grand Rapids, fishermen are able to enjoy a plethora of fishing locations and many off-season parking lots, which are free of charge. The lakes are home to a variety of panfish, both large and smallmouth bass, and even the occasional northern pike. The park offers boat rentals in the summer that can help fishermen reach their desired trophy fish. With very few visitors in the early spring, the area is a delicacy for anglers during the most ideal season to seek out largemouth bass.

The DNR will often stop by to ensure that participants have purchased proper licenses. Additionally, for the health and safety of both the park and its visitors, everyone is encouraged to keep a safe distance from the native swan and goose populations.

== Norovirus outbreak ==
In July 2010, more than 120 visitors contracted norovirus. An epidemiologist stated the most likely cause was that someone who was sick with the virus brought it into the park environment. Tests by the Kent County Health Department confirmed that norovirus was the causative agent.
