= Tory's Cave =

Tory's Cave may refer to:

- Tory's Cave (Springfield, Vermont)
- Tory's Cave (New Milford, Connecticut)
