= Cliff Cave Park =

Public park in St. Louis County, Missouri, U.S.

Cliff Cave County Park
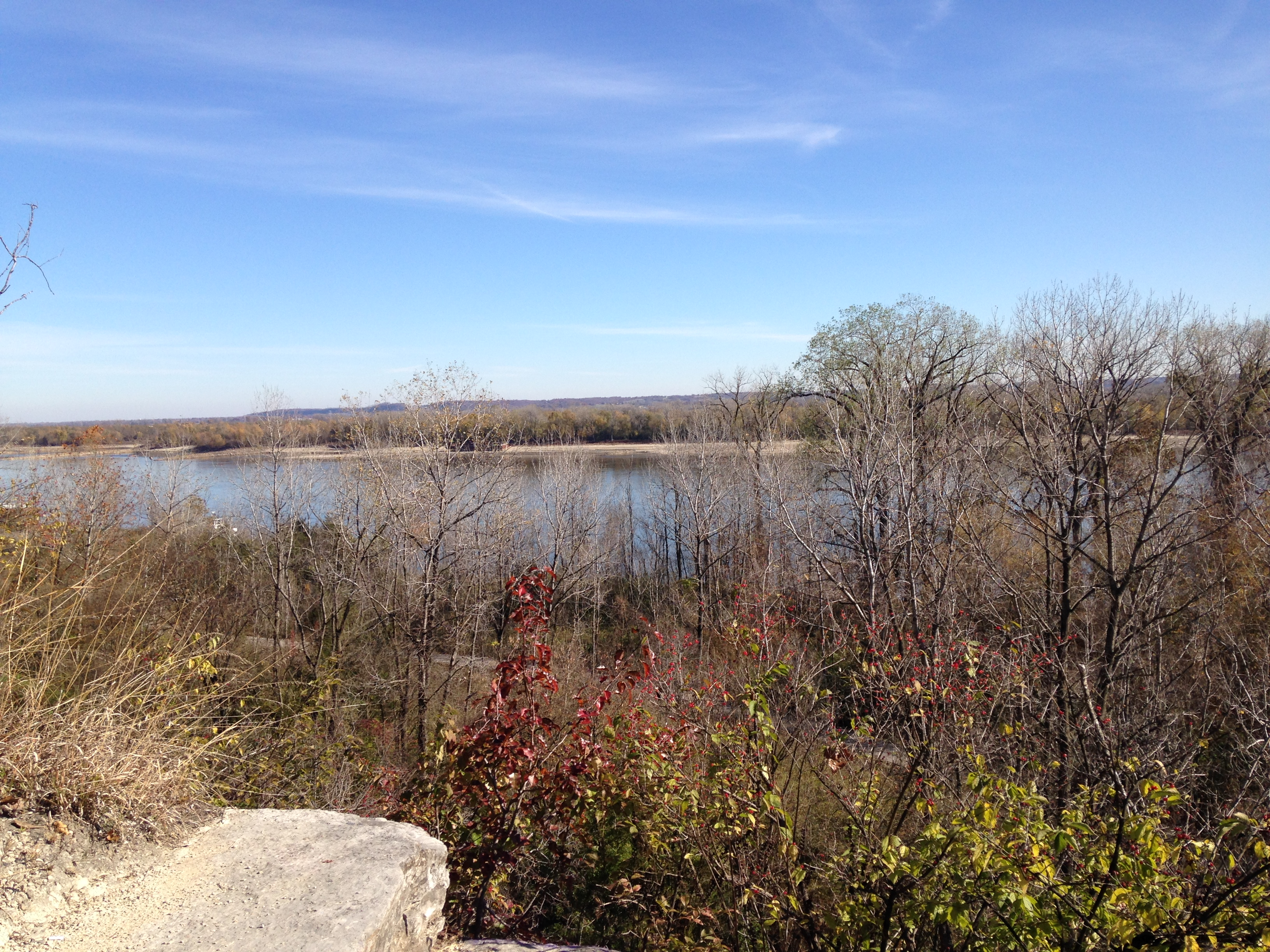
- View of the Mississippi River from the bluffs
- Interactive map of Cliff Cave County Park
- Type: County Park
- Location: 806 Cliff Cave Rd, St Louis, Missouri, United States
- Coordinates: 38.4609°N 90.2929°W
- Area: 525 acres (2.12 km^{2})
- Created: 1972
- Operator: St. Louis County, Missouri
- Website: http://www.stlouisco.com/ParksandRecreation/ParkPages/CliffCave

Cliff Cave Park is a 525-acre public park located in St. Louis County, Missouri. The park is owned and operated by the St. Louis County Department of Parks and Recreation. It is named after Cliff Cave, a natural cave located in the park that is a historical and archaeologic site. The park contains woodlands, wetlands, and rocky hillsides and is adjacent to the Mississippi River. It has three trails: the Mississippi Trail, the Spring Valley Trail, and the River Bluff Trail. The Riverside Shelter overlooks the Mississippi River. An active train track runs through the park. Cliff Cave Park is part of the Mississippi River Greenway. The park won the "Best View of the Mississippi" award in 2009, which it was granted by The Riverfront Times.

== History ==
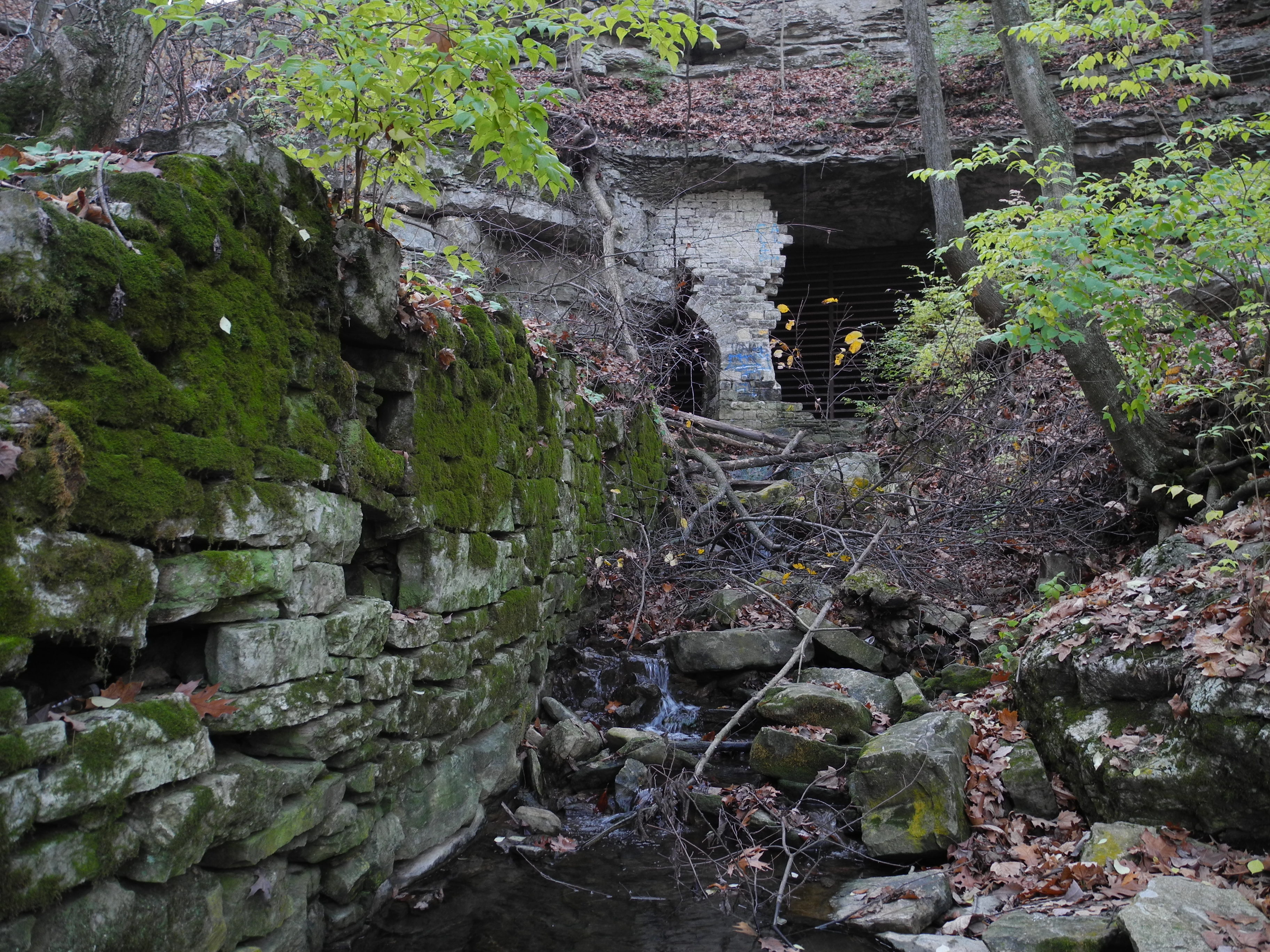
Entrance of Cliff Cave. The walls seen along the stream are remains from the Cliff Cave Wine Company.

Native Americans likely were attracted to the area due to the cave, fresh spring water, and the nearby Mississippi River. They regarded the cave as a sacred place.

In 1749, Jean Baptiste Gamache first acquired the land through a land grant from the Spanish government.

In the 1770s, Cliff Cave was used by the French fur trappers and traders as a riverside tavern for travelers of the Mississippi River.

In 1854, Christopher W. Spalding and Henry W. Williams purchased the area. In 1857, they placed boundaries for the Cliff Cave subdivisions, selling lots from 1.7 acres to 24.7 acres.

In the 1860s, during the Civil War, Confederate soldiers were thought to use the cave as a rendezvous point.

After the Civil War, Missouri became a center of winemaking in the Midwest. In 1866, the Cliff Cave Wine Company was established; in 1868, they purchased the area for $36,176 to use the cave as a natural wine cellar. The company planted twenty-five acres of grapes in the area which produced 3,000 gallons of wine in one year. The company itself had 240 acres of vineyard along the Mississippi River, and by 1870, the cave had a storage capacity of 100,000 gallons of wine. Stonework near the cave entrance added in this time still exists today.

In the late 1800s, volunteer soldiers from Jefferson Barracks built a saloon in the cave entrance. In approximately 1910, the cave was leased to Anheuser-Busch to store beer, with the company harvesting ice from the river in the winter to keep the beer cool during the summer.

Caves in Missouri were sometimes used by criminals and outlaws in the 19th and 20th centuries. In the early 1900s, Cliff Cave was known as Jesse James Cave (a name shared with other caves in Missouri). During the 1920s, the Mob used the cave as a place to discard bodies.

A tavern and café called "Girlies" was located in the area. A pool of cold water and a mineral odor, named Sun King Pool, was sourced by a spring, but now is the location of the parking lot.

In 1969, after the success of a St. Louis County Bond Issue, the purchase of the Cliff Cave property was initiated. The land was valued at $400,000. The funding was matched with federal acquisition dollars from the Land and Water Conservation Fund and other agencies. In the fall of 1972, the property was acquired. In the spring of 1977, Cliff Cave Park was officially opened to the public.

In 1986, a referendum was held which designated the park as one of five Natural Heritage Parks in the area, limiting the amount of park construction and development to five percent of the total park area.

== Features ==
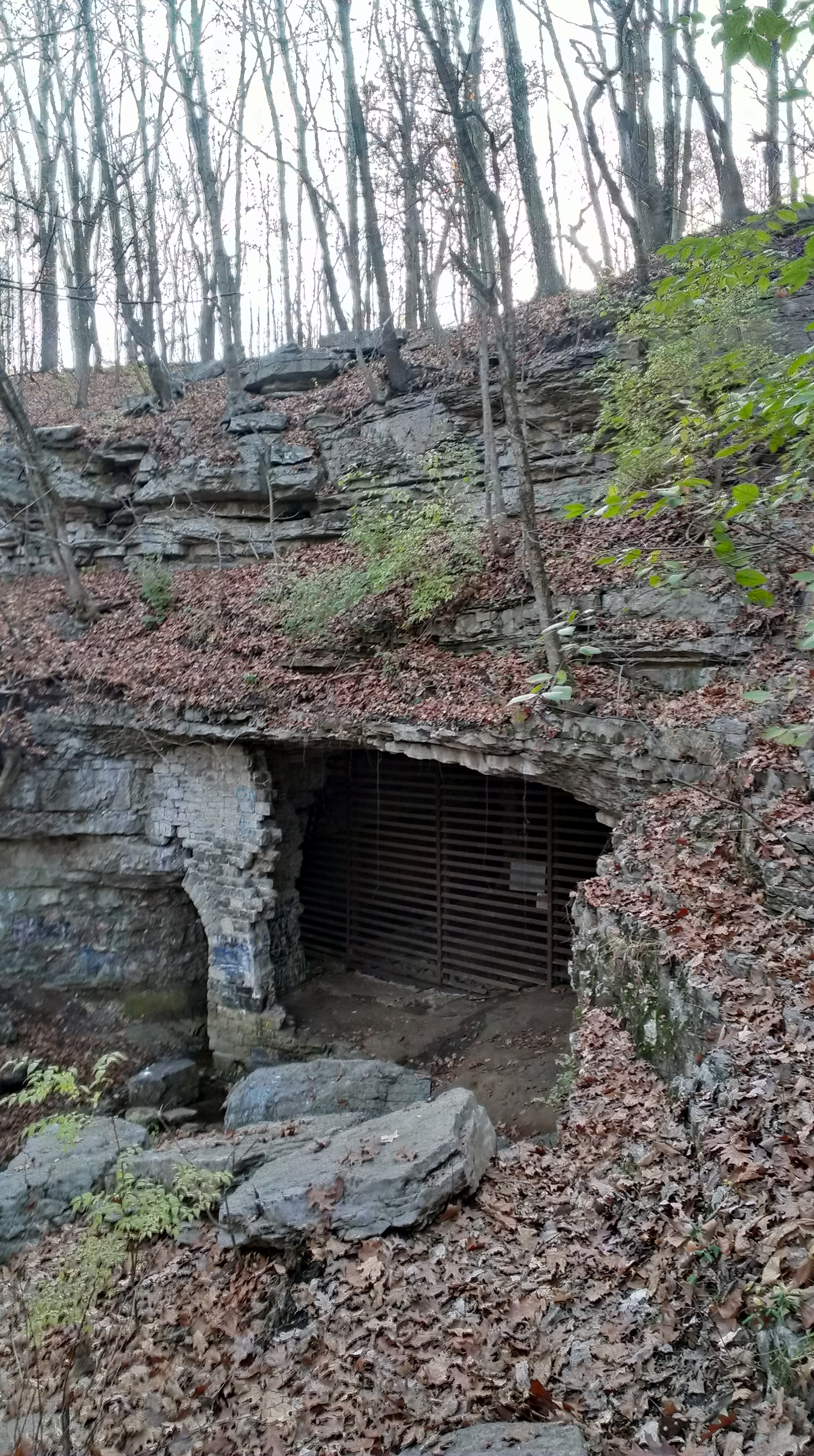
A cave gate was installed in 2009 to help preserve the endangered Indiana bat

=== Cliff Cave ===
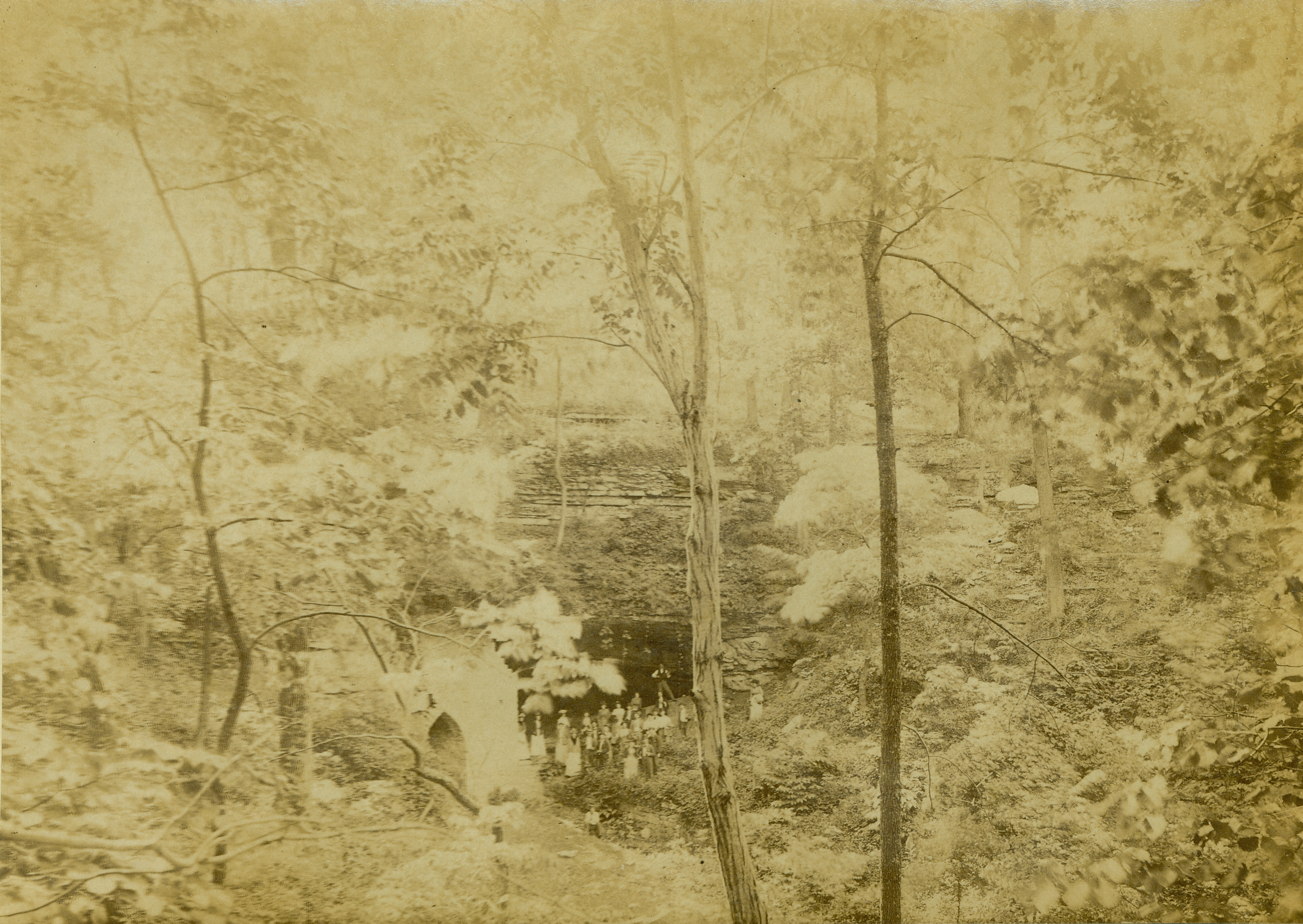
Picnic part in front of entrance of Cliff Cave, 1891

Cliff Cave, also known as Indian Cave, is a natural cave that is considered the second longest cave in St. Louis County, with 4723 ft (1514 m) of cave passage surveyed. It is found at the head of a ravine, with a stream flowing from the entrance. It is developed in Mississippian Period St. Louis limestone. The cave maintains a temperature of 57 °F (14 °C) all year round. The cave was created from the karst plateau in the area forming many sinkholes, dissolving the dolomite/limestone bedrock over time. The cave is connected to a number of these sinkholes, causing the cave to be susceptible to flash flooding.

In October 2009, a cave gate was installed at the cave entrance to preserve the endangered Indiana bat which resided in the cave, as a joint effort between Saint Louis County Department of Parks, Missouri Department of Conservation, U.S. Fish & Wildlife Service, Bat Conservation International, the Missouri Karst and Cave Conservancy, and the Meramec Valley Spelunkers. Other fauna of the cave include big brown bats, little brown bats, eastern pipistrelles, cave salamanders, and isopods. After the gate was installed, the population of bats has increased.

=== Mississippi Trail ===
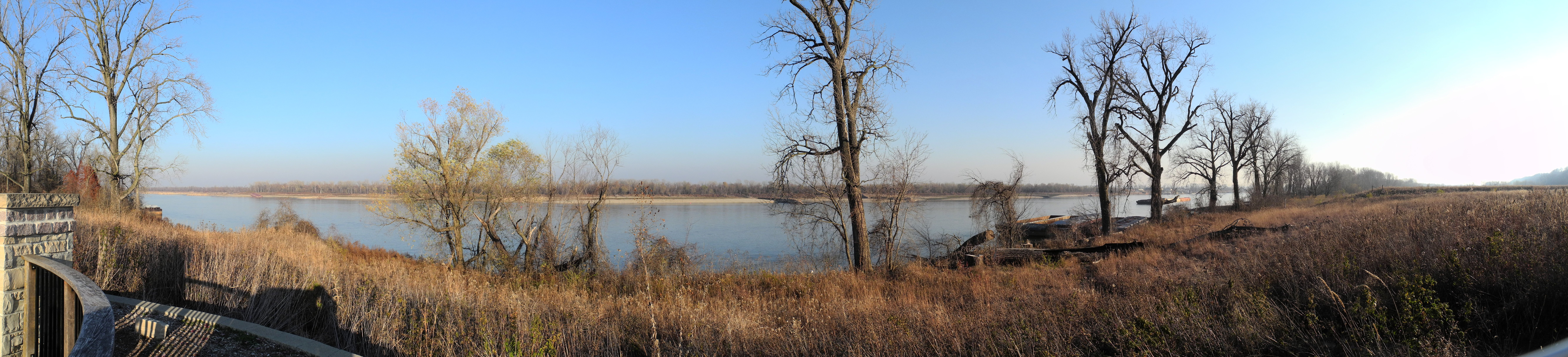
A panorama of the Mississippi River from the park

The Mississippi Trail is a 5.1-mile, flat, paved trail loop accessible to hikers and bikers. It is located in the floodplain bottoms, and goes through bottomland woodlands and wetlands. It occasionally can undergo periodic flooding from the Mississippi River. The flora include wild grasses and wildflowers, silver maple, sycamore, cottonwood, black willow and box elder. The fauna include beavers, migratory waterfowl, great blue herons, and egrets.

=== Spring Valley Trail ===
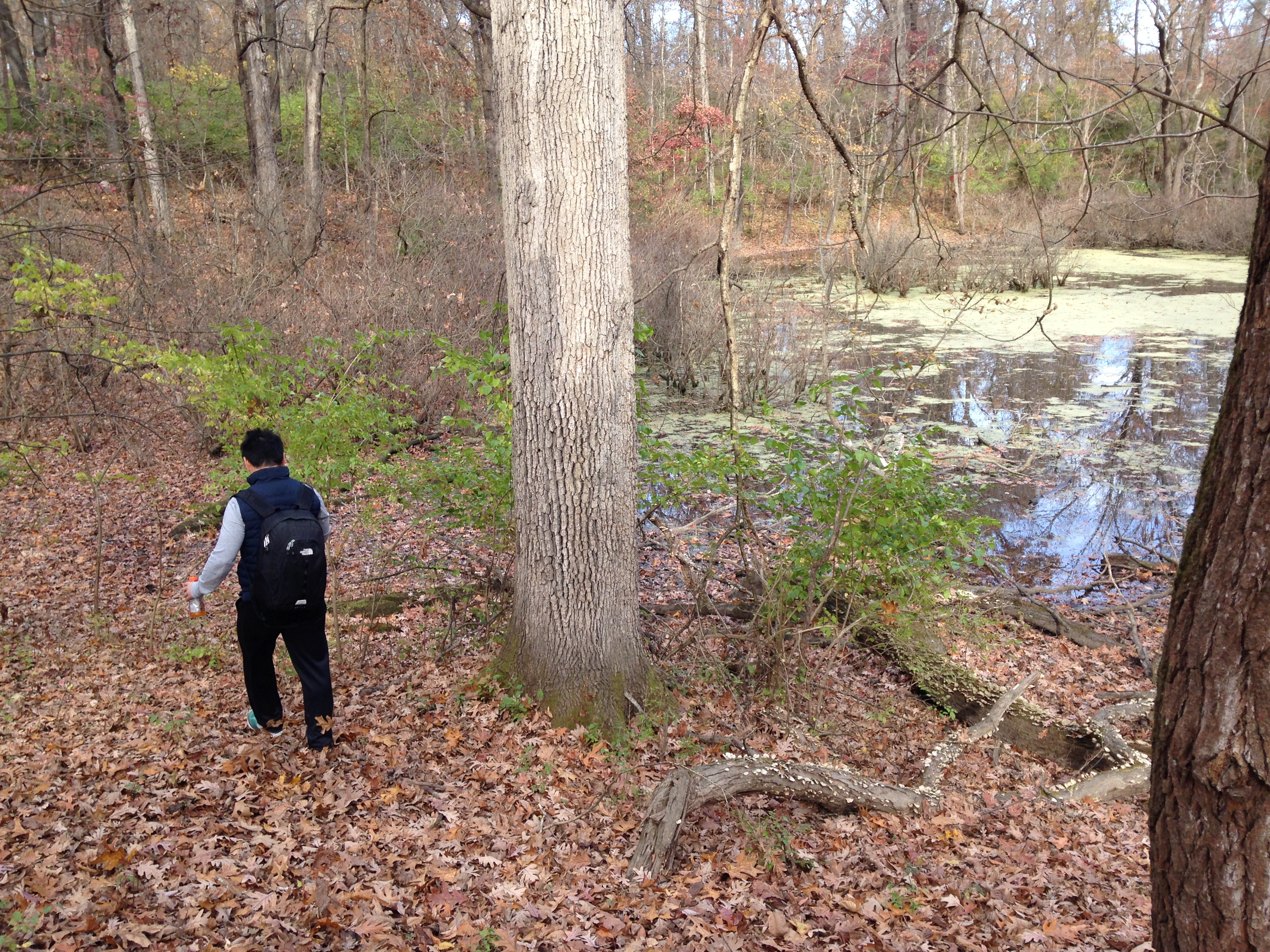
Hiker exploring the wetlands off of the Spring Valley Trail

The Spring Valley Trail is a 3-mile natural treadway trail accessible to equestrians, hikers, and mountain bikers. Cliff Cave can be accessed from this trail. The trail goes up a valley, then reaches a karst plateau and forms a loop in the woodlands. The flora include hickory and oak trees.

=== River Bluff Trail ===
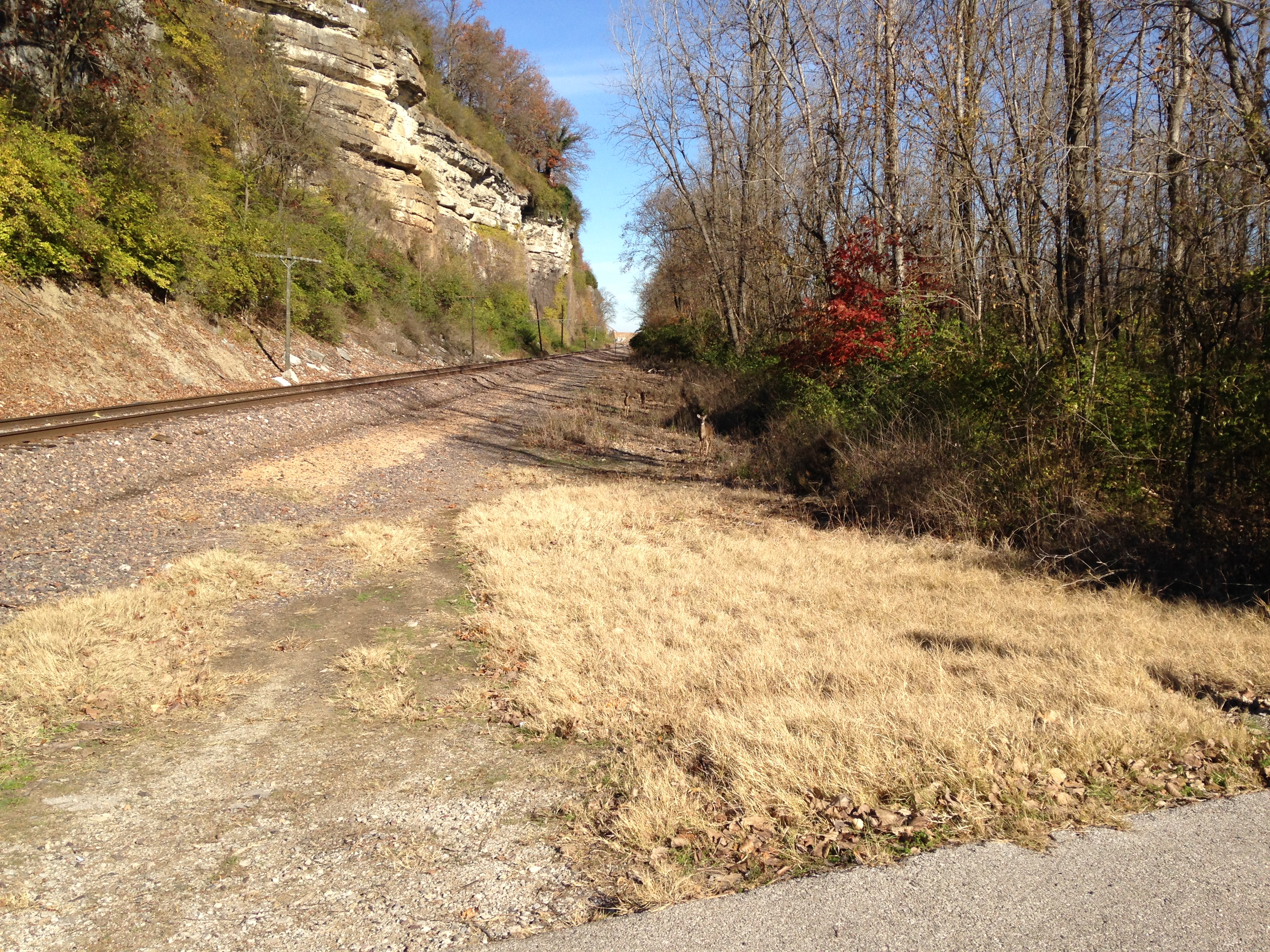
A view of the bluffs, railroad tracks, and local fauna

The River Bluff Trail is a 1-mile flat, natural treadway trail accessible to equestrians, hikers, and mountain bikers. This trail affords a scenic vantage point to see the Mississippi River from the bluffs. Flora include prairie grasses including the native side-oats grama and little bluestem, wildflowers, and chinkapin oak trees. The fauna is being threatened by invasive species such as honeysuckle.

== Incidents ==
On July 23, 1993, six people were killed while exploring the cave due to a flash flood. Four counselors and 12 boys from the St. Joseph's Home for Boys, a residential treatment center for abused or troubled youth, were exploring the area. Seven were trapped in the cave when rain caused flash flooding. The bodies of four youths and two adult counselors were later found. One boy survived and was found 18 hours after the flood with mild head trauma and hypothermia.

On October 5, 2008, an eighteen-year-old high school student slipped and fatally fell from a steep bluff.

On November 7, 2016, during a dispute with his wife, a man drove his four- and five-year-old sons to the park, and an Amber alert was issued. As law enforcement were approaching, the man fatally shot his two children and then himself.
