= Beaver Valley Rock Shelter Site =

Cave in Delaware, US

- U.S. National Register of Historic Places
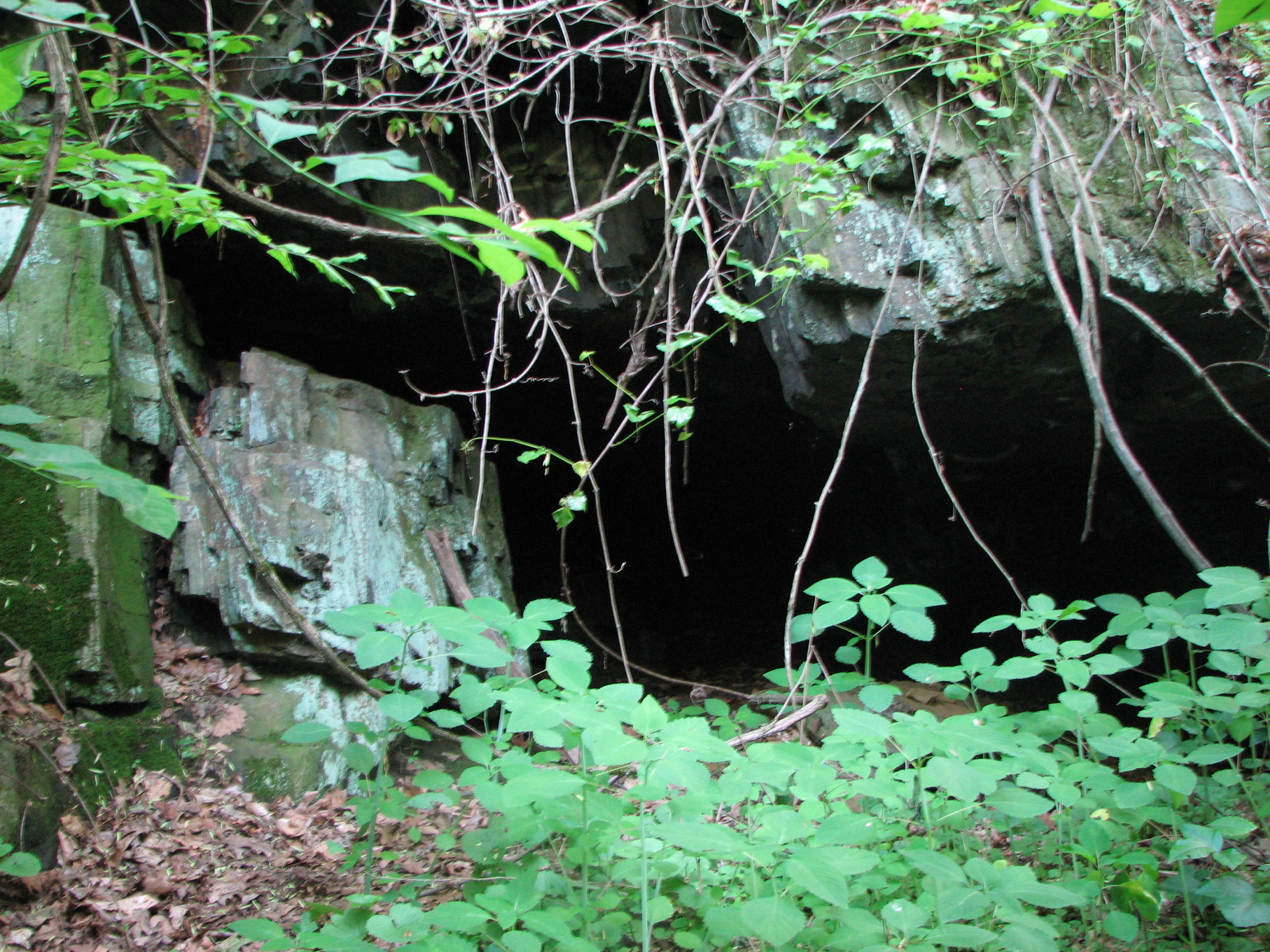
- Nearest city: Wilmington, Delaware
- Area: less than one acre
- NRHP reference No.: 78000910
- Added to NRHP: September 1, 1978

The Beaver Valley Rock Shelter Site is the only formally recognized cave in the US state of Delaware. It is located in New Castle County near Wilmington and the state line with Pennsylvania.

== History ==
Up until the mid-twentieth century and despite ample historical evidence that Delaware Indians used it for shelter, the National Speleological Society maintained that Delaware was the only state in the union lacking a cave. In 1958, a local resident, George Jackson, added this cave to the national cave files. The cave was the focus of research in the 1940s when the Archeological Society of Delaware conducted a dig which revealed conclusively that native tribes (including Lenni Lenape) had used it for shelter and storage. Sitting just 100 feet from the Pennsylvania border this small cave extends just 56 feet to its furthest reach, but has become one of the most researched caves in the United States relative to its size. Jack Speece notes that the cave has gone by many names in its history. Indian Cave, Beaver Valley Rock Shelter, and Wolf Rock Cave preceded the now more commonly accepted "Beaver Valley Cave".

The site was listed on the National Register of Historic Places in 1978.

== Not formally recognized or lost caves ==
The Brandywine Springs cave was surveyed by the Delaware Geological Survey, but it is not recognized in any other publications. The feature is located in Brandywine Springs Park approximately 100 yards east of the Wilmington and Western Railroad tracks.

There are several documented caves or shelter sites that have been razed or disrupted. Publications from the 19th and 20th century have proven their once existence. All these sites are located in upper New Castle County. The best documented one is provided by Hilborne T. Cresson. He discovered many artifacts and bones of indigenous peoples at the destroyed Naamans Creek Rock Shelter site. The site was destroyed by the Baltimore and Ohio Railroad. Most of the artifacts and remains are in the possession of the Peabody Museum and other New England based organizations.

== Dead Poets Society ==
The cave is featured in the film Dead Poets Society as the location of the titular group's meetings. The scenes featuring a cave used a mix of shots from Banning Park in Wilmington, Beaver Valley Shelter Site, and recreated indoor sets.

== See also ==
- National Register of Historic Places listings in northern New Castle County, Delaware
