= Crawford State Park (Washington) =

State park in the U.S. state of Washington

Crawford State Park Heritage Site
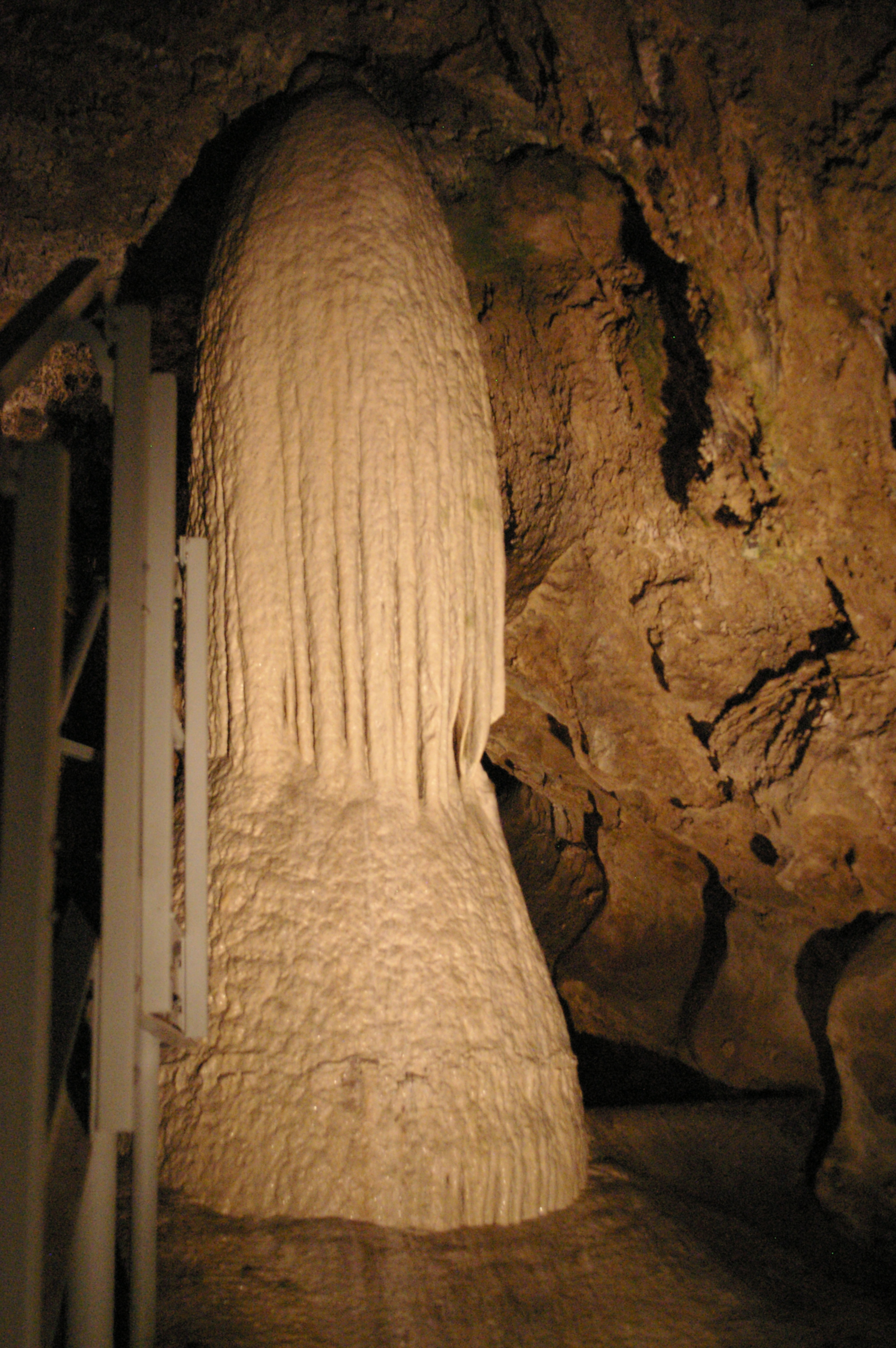
- Formation in Gardner Cave

- Location within Washington (state) Location within the United States
- Interactive map of Crawford State Park Heritage Site
- Location: Pend Oreille County, Washington, United States
- Coordinates: 48°59′41″N 117°22′10″W
- Area: 40 acres (16 ha)
- Elevation: 2,713 ft (827 m)
- Established: 1921
- Administrator: Washington State Parks and Recreation Commission
- Visitors: 4,810 (in 2024)
- Website: Official website

Crawford State Park Heritage Site is a 40-acre (16 ha) Washington state park located 11 miles (18 km) north of Metaline on the Canada–United States border in Pend Oreille County. The park preserves Gardner Cave, one of the longest natural limestone caves in the state. The cave is approximately 2,072 feet (632 m) feet in length and has stalactites, stalagmites, rimstone pools, and flowstone. The park is open and offers cave tours on a seasonal basis.

== History ==
The cave is named for Ed Gardner who is said to have discovered it around 1899. The park is named for William Crawford who came into possession of the property and deeded it to the state in 1921.
