= Lost River Cave =

Cave system in Bowling Green, Kentucky, United States

Coordinates: 36°57′10.20″N 86°28′17.99″W

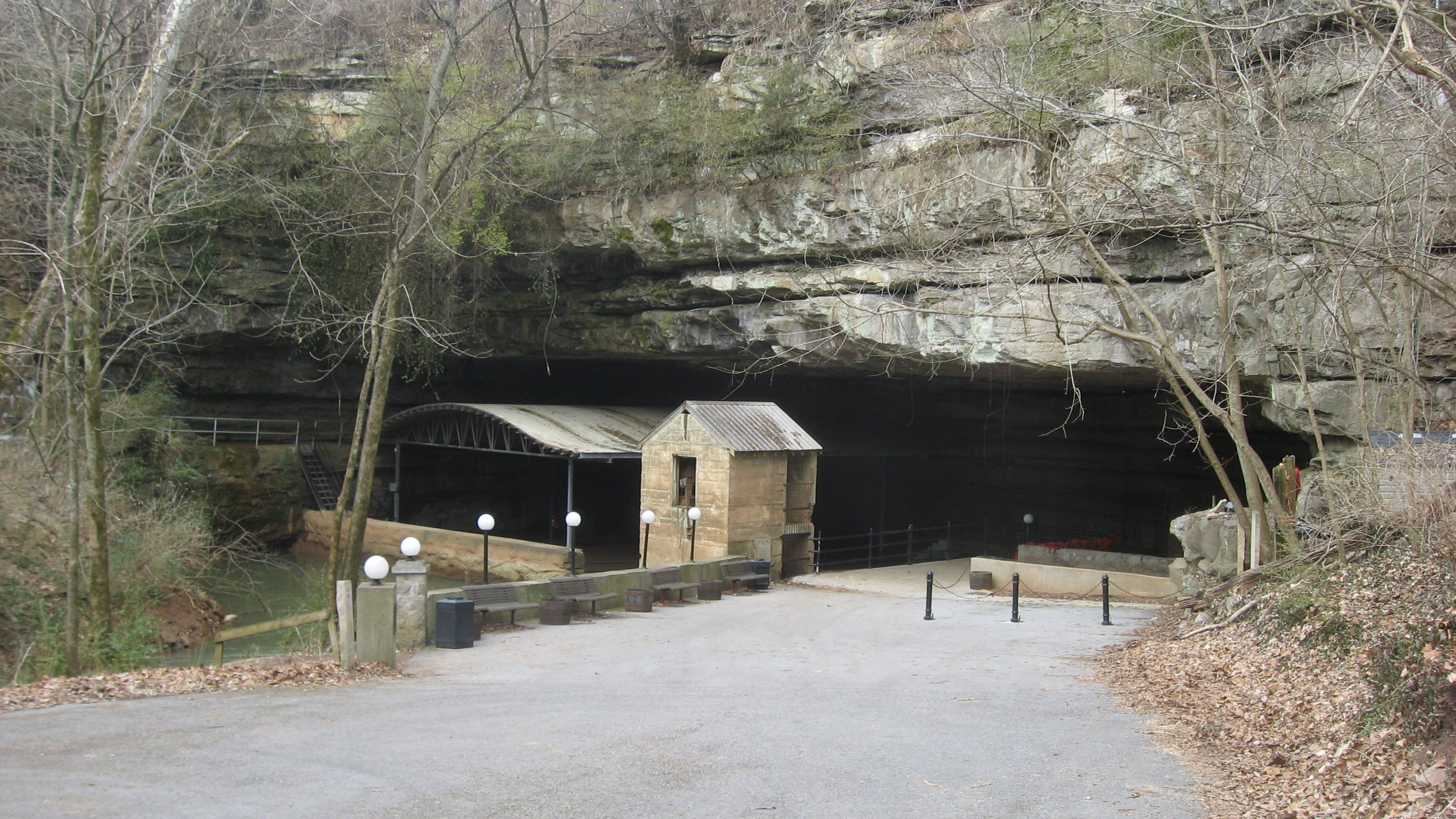
Cave entrance

Lost River Cave is a seven-mile cave system located in Bowling Green, Kentucky. The Lost River originates outside of the cave and flows into it. The cave contains one of the largest natural entrances in the Eastern U.S. Boat tours are available year-round, but closed for Thanksgiving Day, Christmas Eve, Christmas Day, and New Year's Day. The river was once listed by Ripley's Believe it or Not as the "Shortest, deepest river in the world" because the blue hole is over 437 feet deep, while the river itself is only 400 feet long. In fact, the blue hole is only 15 feet deep, but is linked to a further underground river. The 72-acre cave property is jointly owned by Western Kentucky University and the non-profit Friends of Lost River Cave.

== Geology ==
The cave consists of Chert (known as the Lost River Chert), which is overlaid by the Ste. Genevieve Limestone and St. Louis Limestone, both of which were laid down in the middle to late Mississippian Period. The river appears above ground in three short sections before flowing into the mouth of the cave. The most interesting section is the blue hole, which is the cause of the Lost River being listed by Ripley's Believe it or Not as the "Shortest, deepest river in the world." Plumb bobs indicated that the blue hole was 437 feet deep, while the river itself is only 400 feet long. The blue hole is though in fact linked to a further underground river. This caused plumb bobs to be swept underground, returning erroneous measurements.

According to Malcolm Field and Guanguan Li:

Flow along the length of the cave is relatively uniform along much of its length, but older, higher passages can be inundated by flood-flow conditions. Blocks of the Lost River Chert routinely detach from cave walls and line the cave floor as the limestone dissolves away. The detached chert blocks create minor detention backwaters containing immobile-flow regions. Undercut benches and recirculation with scalloped walls also serve as minor immobile flow regions.

In 1847, Thomas Kite provided the following description of the river and cave in his journal:

Three miles from Bowling Green on the Nashville Road we visited cave mill. A growth of fine timber here skirts the road and would prevent us or the casual observer from noting the large sink of an oval form at the bottom of which (one hundred feet below) flows a river twenty or thirty yards wide. Descending its precipitous sides, a scene of wild and rugged beauty presents. At one end the river rising at once full grown, flows about three hundred yards enclosed by the steep and rocky sides of the ravine then enters a cavern one hundred and fifty feet wide at its mouth and at least forty or fifty feet high. A solid arch of rock about fifty feet in thickness forming the roof. Under this arch an enterprising Kentuckian has located his grist mill and the noise of falling water and the clattering of the cog wheels by giving life and animation increases the picturesque effects. Finding a small board, we secured upon it a Bengal light, ignited it, and committing it to the current, it floated away, illuminating the extensive cavern, with the intense brilliancy of its light, until a change in course of the cave hid it behind a projecting rock from those at the mouth, who were anxiously watching its progress.

== First inhabitants ==
Archaeologists at Western Kentucky University have uncovered a significant history of human presence dating from the Paleo-Indians at the end of the last ice age 10,000 years ago. The location of the cave and the valley provided area inhabitants with shelter and with safe and plentiful sources of food and water.

Ten thousand years ago, the Kentucky climate was cooler and wetter. The landscape supported evergreen forest. The Paleo-Indian Cultural Tradition, also known as "big game hunters", roamed the forests in search of food and shelter. These humans utilized Clovis spear points to bring down such animals as the giant ground sloth, the woolly mammoth, and the mastodon. The inhabitants were nomadic groups, moving between different camp sites seasonally. Anthropologist Jack Schock of Western Kentucky University believes that these prehistoric Kentucky tribes camped at Lost River Cave in the winter, enjoying shelter from the cave and clean water from the blue hole.

Starting around 8,000 B.C., during the Archaic period in North America, the inhabitants began exploiting the environment in a more organized fashion. One of the only Dalton points found in situ in southeastern Kentucky was discovered at Lost River by Dr. Schock. This spear point, dated at around 8,000 years old, is a rare find, making Lost River an important archaeological site for studying the Archaic period. These native groups occupied the Cave region until around 1,000 B.C.

== Mill ==
The proximity of the cave to Bowling Green and the Louisville-Nashville Turnpike allowed it to contribute to the 19th century commercial and agricultural development of Warren County. There are many conflicting reports on the construction of the first water mill at Lost River Cave. Some undocumented 20th century reports state that it was built in 1792 (the year Bowling Green was founded) as a corn gristmill and saw mill. Other accounts place the construction of the "first flour mill in Warren County" much later. Throughout the 19th century, the site hosted several mills with different operators and production goals. The first of these structures sat inside the cave; however, later millers built their operations on top of the arched entrance to the cavern. According to W. F. Smith, who bought the cave in 1917, Shank's Mill was the only underground water mill in the U.S.

By 1825, the mill was under the ownership of James Skiles. In 1847, a Mr. Shanks owned the mill. In addition to producing grist, he installed a wool carding machine. This mill was built directly in the stream under the rock arch of the cave entrance.

[The] water [is] confined just above a wall of masonry being built across with narrow gates or issues for the water to pass through.

— Samuel Hibbs, 8th Kansas Infantry, camped at Lost River in 1862

In the mid-1870s, John L. Row built a stone dam in the stream near the cave entrance, drilled through 42 feet of bedrock in the arched ceiling of the cave entrance, and constructed a three-story high mill above the cave. A shaft ran to an undershot wheel in the dam raceway. He operated his mill as a distillery and flour mill until 1889 when it was purchased by James Skaggs.

The last mill at Lost River, owned by Robert Crump, was destroyed by fire in 1915. A history of industry which lasted over a century ended with the burning of the old mill. Today, the hole John Row drilled in the cave ceiling, a reconstructed dam from the nightclub era and a large waterwheel at the entrance to the park are used by interpreters to explain the importance of economic and industrial development for early owners of the cave and valley.

== Civil War ==
During the Civil War, the cave and valley were under the control of both sides at different times. Confederate forces occupied Bowling Green from September 18, 1861, to February 14, 1862. The area was then taken over by Union soldiers and used as a camp. John Hunt Morgan allegedly hid in the cave when escaping from pursuing troops after burning the train depot at Shakertown, South Union, Kentucky. However, this story holds little credibility, since Union soldiers were camped there.

During the period of Union control, nearly 40,000 soldiers camped in the vicinity of the cave. Later explorers have found places where soldiers wrote their names, ranks and companies on the ceilings and walls of the cave. Archaeologists have also found Union bullets within the cave chamber.

== Cavern Nite Club era ==
Like many caves, Lost River was rumored to have been used for manufacturing alcohol during the Prohibition, although this has not been proven. With the repeal of Prohibition, however, the cave obtained a new use. In 1934, local businessman Jimmy Stewart opened a nightclub in the mouth of the cave, complete with stage, bar and dance floor. Known as the "Cavern Nite Club," the venue was popular because of its cool temperatures during a time when air conditioning was relatively rare. Famous performers included Dinah Shore, Francis Craig, and the NBC Orchestra. In 1939, Billboard Magazine named the Cavern Nite Club as the only air-conditioned nightclub in the U.S. Electricity was generated by the water wheel, using a 15-kilowatt alternator manufactured by the Ideal Manufacturing Company of Mansfield, Ohio.

The Cavern Nite Club was made accessible to tourists by the construction of the Dixie Highway (now U.S. 31W) on the right-of-way of the 19th-Century Louisville-Nashville Turnpike. The nightclub and cave tours were enhanced by a local legend that the famous outlaw Jesse James hid out in the cave depths to escape the law after robbing the Southern Deposit Bank in Russellville, Kentucky.

Entrance of Lost River Cave in about 1947

== Decline, use as a dump site, and founding of nonprofit ==
The nightclub era ended in the late 1950s and early 1960s. FM radio and television brought about a decline in nightclubs nationwide. Meanwhile, the construction of I-65 re-routed traffic away from Dixie Highway and Lost River Cave. The cool, natural breeze in the cave entrance was less enticing to a generation that had air conditioning in their homes. In 1962, the Cavern Nite Club closed its doors and Lost River Cave entered a time of neglect and abuse. By the 1980s, Lost River Cave had become a dumping site.

In 1990, the Friends of Lost River was formed as a non-profit organization with 501(c)3 status in an effort to return the site to its former glory. The Lost River valley and cave site is now owned jointly by Western Kentucky University and the non-profit Friends of Lost River. The cave reopened to the public in 1997, and most traces of abuse have been wiped away. Programs are in the works to remove invasive pest plants from the valley and upland trails and to construct a wetlands area to improve filtration of storm water entering the cave system.

== Cave boat tour and activities ==
The two-part tour is 45 minutes long. The first part consists of a guided walking tour along the river, the blue hole, and the cave entrance. This offers an opportunity to learn about both the natural and human history of the region. The second part of the tour is conducted on the boat, and allows visitors to explore the inside of the cave.

Lost River Cave contains two event venues. The Historic Lost River Cave Ballroom is located in the cave, on the site of the Cavern Nite Club. The River Birch Meeting Room, located adjacent to the visitor center, and contains its own restrooms, a kitchen, and a big screen TV. Both venues are available for event rentals.

The park includes approximately two miles of nature trails, which are admission-free. The trails are part of the Bowling Green-Warren County Greenways program. Other activities include a seasonal butterfly habitat, gem mining, geocaching, bird watching, and bird bingo. Binoculars can be checked out in the visitor center. The park includes a Young Interpreters program, an outdoor classroom, and children's activities.

== See also ==
- Horse Cave, Kentucky
- List of caves in the United States
