= Bechan Cave =

Rock shelter in the United States

- Location within Utah
- Location: Kane County, Utah, United States
- Coordinates: 37°22′33.16″N 110°52′33.96″W
- Elevation: 1,280 metres (4,200 ft)
- Geology: Sandstone
- Entrances: 1

Bechan Cave is a single-room sandstone rock shelter located at an elevation of 1,280 metres (4,200 ft) along Bowns Canyon Creek, a tributary of the Glen Canyon segment of the Colorado River, in Kane County in southeastern Utah in the United States. The cave is roughly 31 metres (100 ft) wide, 9 metres (30 ft) high and 52 metres (170 ft) deep. It has a single entrance that faces southwest and is well-lit during the daytime.

The cave holds alluvial deposits containing the remains of Pleistocene megafauna, including mammoths, ground sloths, and even-toed ungulates. Archaeological excavation of the site in 1983 and 1984 by paleontologists Larry Agenboard and Jim Mead unearthed animal bones, dung, hair, and teeth dating from 11,555 BCE to 9720 BCE, underneath "a few feet" of cave fill, consisting of ceiling spall and wind-blown sand, containing evidence of Holocene habitation from the Archaic period to the Basketmaker culture and possibly even by Navajo or Paiute. Among the items unearthed were large dung boluses, similar in size to the dung of the African elephant, containing the stems of graminoids and sedge (Carex). The cave is also one of at least seventeen sites on the Colorado Plateau where Archaic-era Southwestern sandals have been discovered.

The cave's name derives from a Navajo word meaning "big dung" or "big feces". The well-preserved dung layer was deposited over approximately 1,000 years by multiple animal species during a period characterized by the proliferation of oak and the decline of blue spruce and water birch. The organic deposit consists primarily of Columbian mammoth (M. columbi) dung but also includes dung belonging to shrub-oxen (E. collinum), Shasta ground sloths (N. shastensis), Harrington's mountain goats (O. harringtoni), bighorn sheep (O. canadensis), cottontail rabbits, pack rats, and possibly equines. With a thickness ranging between 4 and 16 inches (10–41 cm), an area of more than 300 square metres (3,000 ft^{2}), and a volume of 225 cubic metres (8,000 ft^{3}), it is the largest coprolite deposit in North America. Other macrofossils discovered in Bechan Cave include teeth and a bone, a "metapodial condyle", belonging to E. collinum.

The cave is located inside Glen Canyon National Recreation Area and, though it is rarely visited, is accessible on foot from Bowns Canyon. The 5-mile (8.0 km) round-trip hike between Bowns Canyon, which can be reached from Lake Powell by boat, and Bechan Cave is considered moderately difficult.

== See also ==
- Lagerstätte
- List of caves in the United States
