= Oligo-Nunk Cave System =

Cave system in Kentucky, United States

The Oligo-Nunk Cave System is a group of six caves in Kentucky, United States.

== History ==
Until the early 1900s, the C & O railway operated the cave system as a profitable tourist venture. The company had in service multiple trains weekly and special trains that were running to the community of Carter, Kentucky for the sole purpose of visiting the caves on Honeycomb Mountain. When J.F. Lewis purchased the property in the early 1900s, he had no immediate intentions of continuing the cave tours at both the Carter Caves and the Honeycomb Mountain Caves; so it was decided that the Honeycomb Mountain Cave tour operation would be suspended and that no visitors would be permitted.

After oversupply torpedoed much of his tobacco-farming business, Lewis turned the property back into a public caving destination during the 1920s. He improved passages, installed drainage tile and reopened the pavilion. This enabled Lewis to maintain a strong hold on the tourism business in the area. However, this venture lasted for only a short period before it again closed to the public. The family divested itself and focused time and resources towards more profitable ventures.

The caves remain private property held by the Lewis family. Originally, four caves were open for visitors. Eventually surveyors discovered those caves to be connected together in one large system. Engineers and artisans originally entered the caves and every obstruction that marred the beauty of the scene or broke the perfection of a series was removed. In some places, stairways were erected to facilitate access.

The caves are the home of multiple bat species that occupy the Oligo-Nunk Cave system during the hibernation months. This is a collection of several different species including the Indiana and Gray Bat, both on the Federal Endangered Species list.

== See also ==
- List of caves in the United States
