= Blowhole Cave =

Cave in Utah (US)

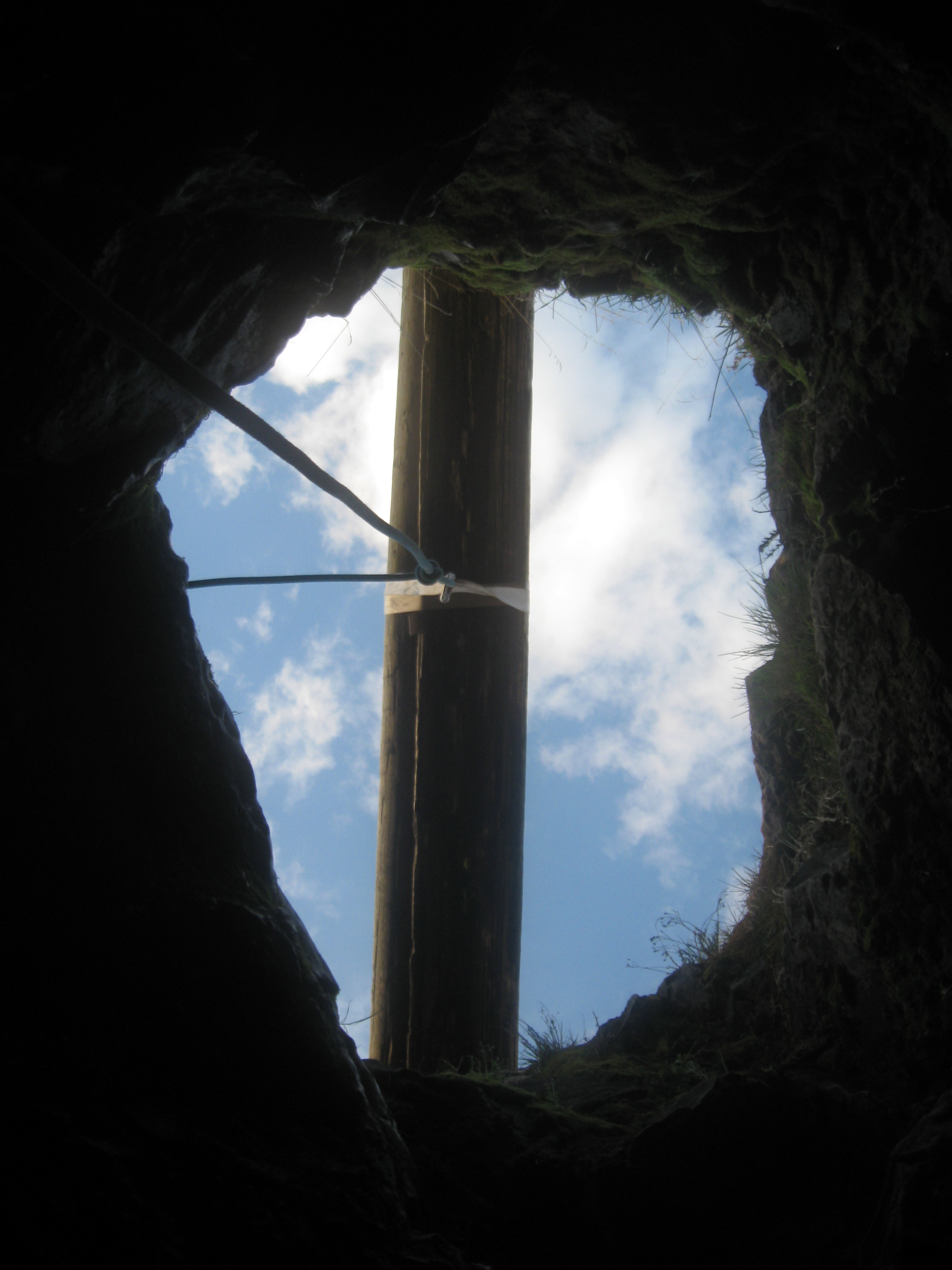
- Interactive map of Blowhole Cave
- Location: Utah County, Utah
- Coordinates: 40.10410°N 112.03709°W
- Depth: 340 feet (100 m)
- Length: 1,165 feet (355 m)
- Elevation: 5,293 feet (1,613 m)
- Geology: Limestone
- Entrances: 1
- Difficulty: Vertical
- Hazards: Slippery surfaces
- Access: Restricted
- Cave survey: Call & Rod Horrocks, 1989

Blowhole Cave is a cave in Utah County, Utah, United States to the west of Utah Lake. The cave is owned by the Utah School and Institutional Trust Lands Administration (SITLA) and is managed by the Timpanogos Grotto of the National Speleological Society. A cave gate was installed April 25–26, 2006. Blowhole cave is very warm (more than 80 °F (27 °C)) and moist. Total surveyed length is 1,165 feet (355 m), and total depth is 340 feet (100 m). Blowhole Cave is the 9th deepest cave in Utah. To explore the cave, approximately 400 feet (120 m) of rope is needed. The most notable formation inside the cave is the Navajo Blanket, a wall composed of brown, tan, red, white, and gray rock.

Navajo Blanket formation
