= OpenROV =

Open-source remotely operated underwater vehicle

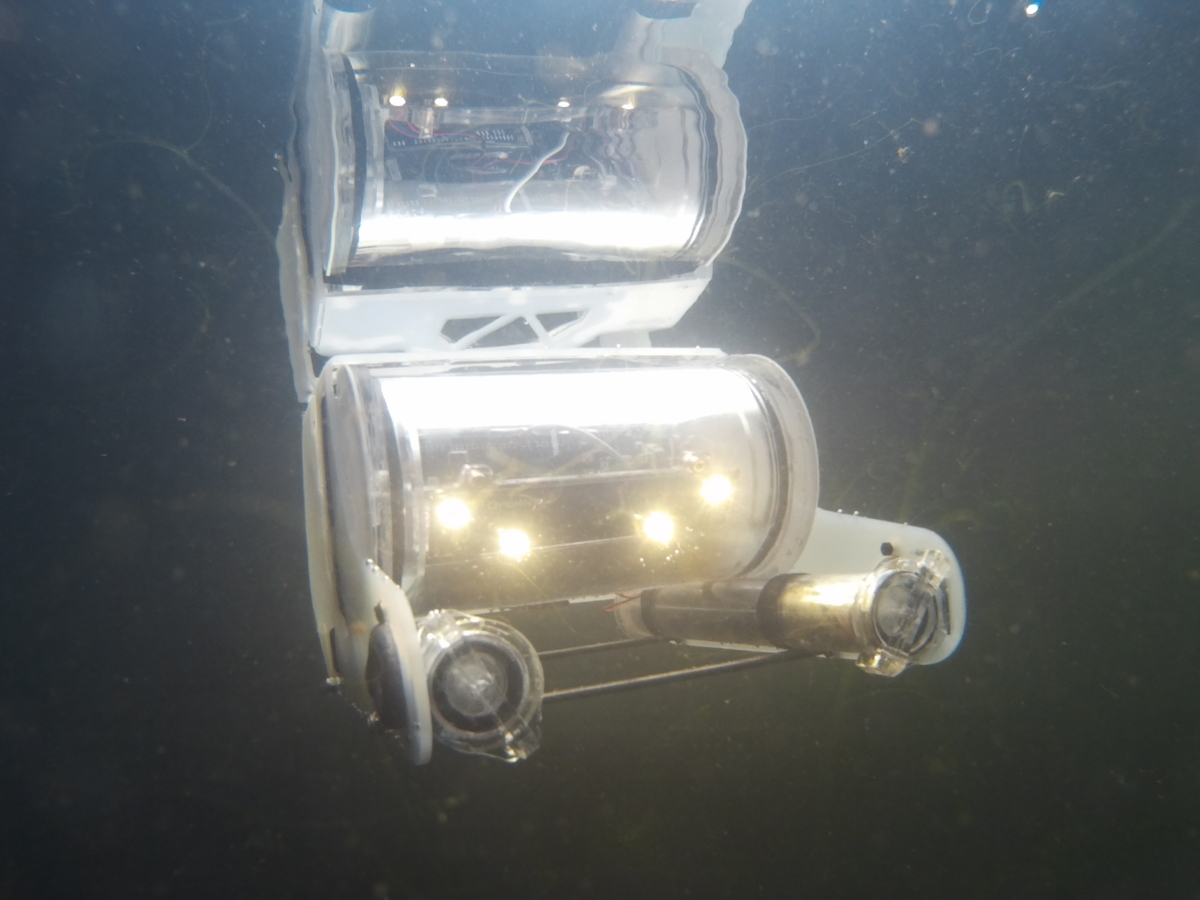
- OpenROV submarine from Xeopesca at A Estrada.
- Manufacturer: OpenROV and DIY community
- Type: Telerobotics submarine underwater drone
- Released: circa 2012, current version: 2.8 (26 Jun. 2017)
- Units sold: 118 (2012)
- Operating system: Linux
- System on a chip: TI AM335x (BeagleBone Black on-board computer)
- CPU: 1 GHz (BeagleBone Black ARM Cortex-A8 processor)
- Memory: 512 MB DDR3 (BeagleBone)
- Storage: 4 GB eMMC on-board flash storage
- Camera: HD USB webcam with 4 LED light arrays on servo-tiltable platform
- Connectivity: 100 Mbit/s Ethernet data tether
- Power: 8 × 26650 Lithium-ion rechargeable batteries (~2h run time)
- Dimensions: 30 cm (12 in) x 20 cm (7.9 in) x 15 cm (5.9 in)
- Weight: 2.6 kg (5.7 lb)

OpenROV was a marine robotics company focused on democratizing underwater exploration through the development of low cost Remotely Operated Vehicle (ROV) technology and an online community of citizen scientists and makers. OpenROV created a series of ROV kits as well as a ready-to-use ROV called Trident, both of which were launched on the crowdfunding platform, Kickstarter. OpenROV was founded by David Lang and Eric Stackpole in 2011, and was based for most of its history in Berkeley, CA. In 2019, OpenROV merged with Spoondrift Technologies to create Sofar Ocean Technologies.

== Telerobotic submarine ==
OpenROV is a remotely operated mini-submarine that weighs ~2.6 kg and has dimensions 15 cm x 20 cm x 30 cm. This submarine is powered by eight 26650-format Li-ion batteries and can be assembled from common materials, with the most expensive piece being the BeagleBone Black Linux computer (~$89). The submarine is controlled from a laptop computer connected to the submarine via a tether and is equipped with on-board LEDs and a camera. OpenROV is an open-source hardware project. By providing the list of the submarine parts and instructions on how to assemble them, the developers aim to democratize underwater exploration.

== Community ==
In addition to being a robotic submarine, OpenROV is also a DIY community of amateur and professional OpenROV submarine builders in over 30 countries that pursue underwater exploration. OpenROV forums provides a platform for users to discuss ideas, solve problems, and share information. Similarly, users can document builds, projects, and deployments on the Open Explorer platform.

== Hall City Cave ==
The development of the OpenROV submarine was in part fueled by the legend that stolen gold is hidden in the deep waters of the Hall City Cave located near Hayfork in Trinity County, Northern California. According to the legend, a few renegade Native Americans stole ~100 pounds of gold nuggets from miners in the 1800s, but were chased. To escape from the pursuit, the renegades had to bury the nuggets in deep waters of the nearby Hall City Cave to lighten their load, but could not retrieve the gold, because they were soon caught and hanged. Even though many have tried to find the gold, nobody has been able to get to the bottom of the narrow and deep well of the cave. Some of the OpenROV testing has taken place at that cave.

However, there appears to be no newspaper reports of this particular ambush and murders, though there is a report of two miners being murdered and the gold being buried on one of the river flats of the upper Trinity River.

== Developers ==
The idea to build OpenROV was pioneered by Eric Stackpole, an engineering intern at NASA at the time, to discover whether the legend about the hidden treasure of the Hall City Cave was true. David Lang, a self-taught sailor from Minnesota, heard about Stackpole building a small, cheap, and robust submarine in his garage to search for the gold and became inspired to join. M.K. Borri designed and built the electronics, software and motor system for a prototype presented at the World Maker Faire in 2011. Lang and Stackpole co-founded OpenROV as an open-source hardware project, a startup, and a DIY community.

== Bibliography ==
- El Jalaoui, A. (2007). Gestion Contextuelle de Tâches pour le contrôle d'un véhicule sous-marin autonome (Doctoral dissertation, Université Montpellier II-Sciences et Techniques du Languedoc).
