= Current River Cavern =

Cave in Missouri, United States

Coordinates: 36°58′39″N 91°02′03″W

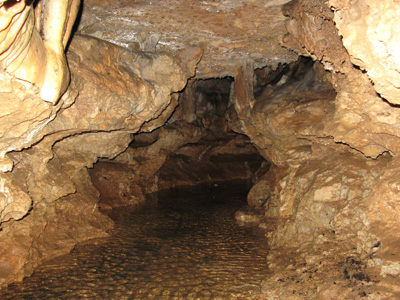
A passage in the cave before installation of the new boardwalk.

Current River Cavern is a show cave located in one mile west of Van Buren, MO on U.S. Route 60. The cave is located inside Missouri Down Under Adventure Zoo. The cave was first opened as a show cave in 1940 under the name "Cave Spring Onyx Caverns".

Current River Cavern was formed exclusively by the stream that still runs through the cave; a rarity among Missouri caves. The cave is set in the Eminence Dolomite.

The commercial section of the cave extends 240 ft (73 m) before ending at a flooded passage. A 1996 survey reported 2,384 ft (727 m) of passages extending far beyond the commercial section.

Current River Cavern is the first show cave to use all battery powered, wireless LED lights for illumination. The LED lights do not promote algae growth or harm cave life. In addition, the lack of wires through the cave creates a more safe and natural experience.

== See also ==
- Caves of Missouri
