= Indian Jim's Cave =

Archaeological site in Virginia, United States

- U.S. National Register of Historic Places
- Virginia Landmarks Register
- Nearest city: Brookneal, Virginia
- Area: 1 acre (0.40 ha)
- NRHP reference No.: 82004562
- VLR No.: 041-0106

Significant dates
- Added to NRHP: August 26, 1982
- Designated VLR: March 17, 1981

Indian Jim's Cave is a historic archaeological site located near Halifax, Halifax County, Virginia. "Indian Jim" is generally acknowledged as the last full-time tenant of the cave and it is believed that he is buried nearby.

It was listed on the National Register of Historic Places in 1982.
