= Buckeye Creek Cave =

Cave in West Virginia, United States

Coordinates: 37.977°N 80.399°W

Buckeye Creek Cave is located on Butler Mountain in Greenbrier County, West Virginia. The cave's formation has been aided by Buckeye Creek, a tributary of Spring Creek.

== Geology ==
Limestone sediments were deposited during the Mississippian and are primarily composed from the Greenbrier Group. Buckeye Creek Cave's passages were formed through underground sections of Buckeye Creek eroding away at these Mississippian sediments.

The cave features a variety of speleothems such as stalactites, and stalagmites. These speleothems form as calcite precipitates out of groundwater in the cave. Rimstone Dams are also present as acidic water erodes its surrounding limestone.

Due to Buckeye Creek running through the cave, there are large amounts of flood deposits and organic material present.

== Exploration ==
Buckeye Creek Cave was first explored by Jim Berry and Gordon Rutzen, members of the National Speleological Society, during the late 1950s & early 1960s.

The first survey was completed by the Baltimore Grotto in the early 1960s. A second survey was completed by the West Virginia Association for Cave Studies (WVACS). This extended upon the work of the Baltimore Grotto and resulted in the first published map of Buckeye cave Creek. Through 1985-1987, a new collection of surveys was completed by George Dasher & WVACS. This allowed for a new, more-complete map to be created.
