= Bat Cave and Cascade Caverns State Nature Preserves =

Nature preserve in Kentucky, United States

- IUCN category IV (habitat/species management area)
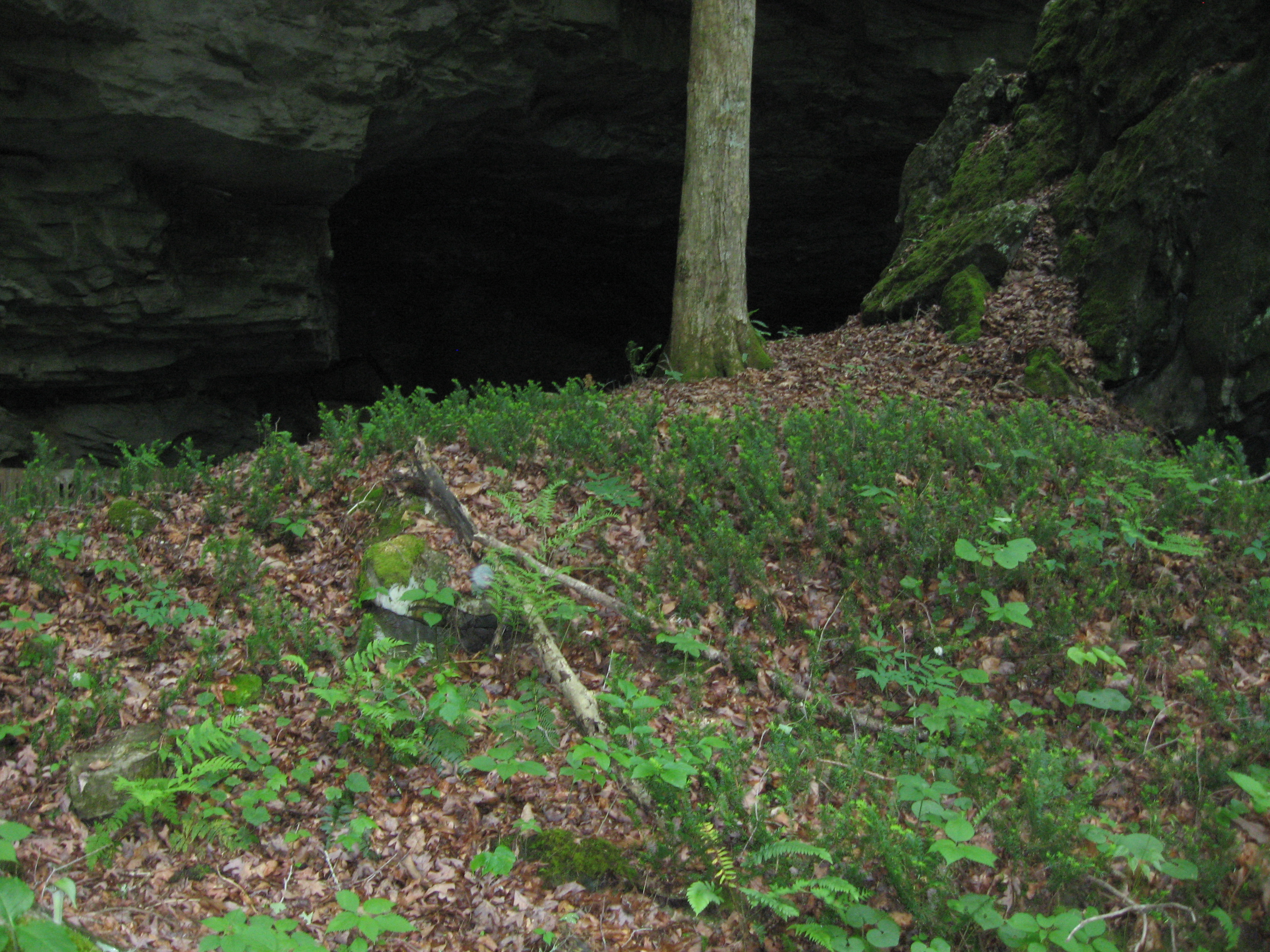
- Canadian Yew is a northern, evergreen shrub that grows where cool air blows from entrances to Cascade Caverns
- Interactive map of Bat Cave and Cascade Caverns State Nature Preserves
- Location: Carter County, Kentucky, United States
- Coordinates: 38°21′21″N 83°06′41″W
- Area: 146 acres (59 ha)
- Established: December 16, 1981

Bat Cave and Cascade Caverns State Nature Preserves are two nature preserves totaling 146 acres (0.59 km^{2}) located within the boundaries of Carter Caves State Resort Park in Carter County, Kentucky, United States. Bat Cave was dedicated as part of the Office of Kentucky Nature Preserves system on December 16, 1981, for the protection of the Indiana bat with wintering numbers estimated at 28,000. The Cascade Caverns preserve was included to protect two rare plant species in Kentucky, the mountain maple and the Canadian yew.
