= Antelope Cave =

- U.S. National Register of Historic Places
- Nearest city: near Colorado City, Arizona
- Area: less than one acre
- NRHP reference No.: 75000351
- Added to NRHP: October 10, 1975

Antelope Cave is a limestone cave near Colorado City, Arizona on the Uinkaret Plateau. It was added to the National Register of Historic Places in 1975 as an archeological site. It is roughly 130 feet wide and 350 long once entered. It was site of a prehistoric activity. It is not related to Antelope Canyon in Coconino County, Arizona.

== Historic use ==
Human use of Antelope cave has been dated to 4000 years using radiocarbon dating. The site is thought to have been inhabited sporadically from that time until roughly 1000 BCE. At least 4460 items from the site where excavated by the University of California in 1959 when the site came under threat from archaeological looters. Counting these and other artifacts gathered at other times, over 10000 artifacts were removed from the site. These have been used in scholarship on topics ranging from the footwear of the inhabitants to diabetes.

== Rediscovery and modern times ==
The cave was known to relic hunters by the 1920s, but was not studied by the scientific community until 1954. In that year, a research expedition was mounted by Robert C. Euler. In 1959, danger to the site by looters increased, and using money provided from a grant by the University of California, a major expedition was undertaken to salvage as much information as possible. 520 cubic feet of material were processed. The cave is now gated and closed to the public. Antelope Cave is located in Mohave County, Arizona southwest of Colorado City and Hildale, Utah and southeast of Hurricane, Utah. It is close to a large power transmission line.
