= Ursa Minor (cave) =

Cave in California, United States

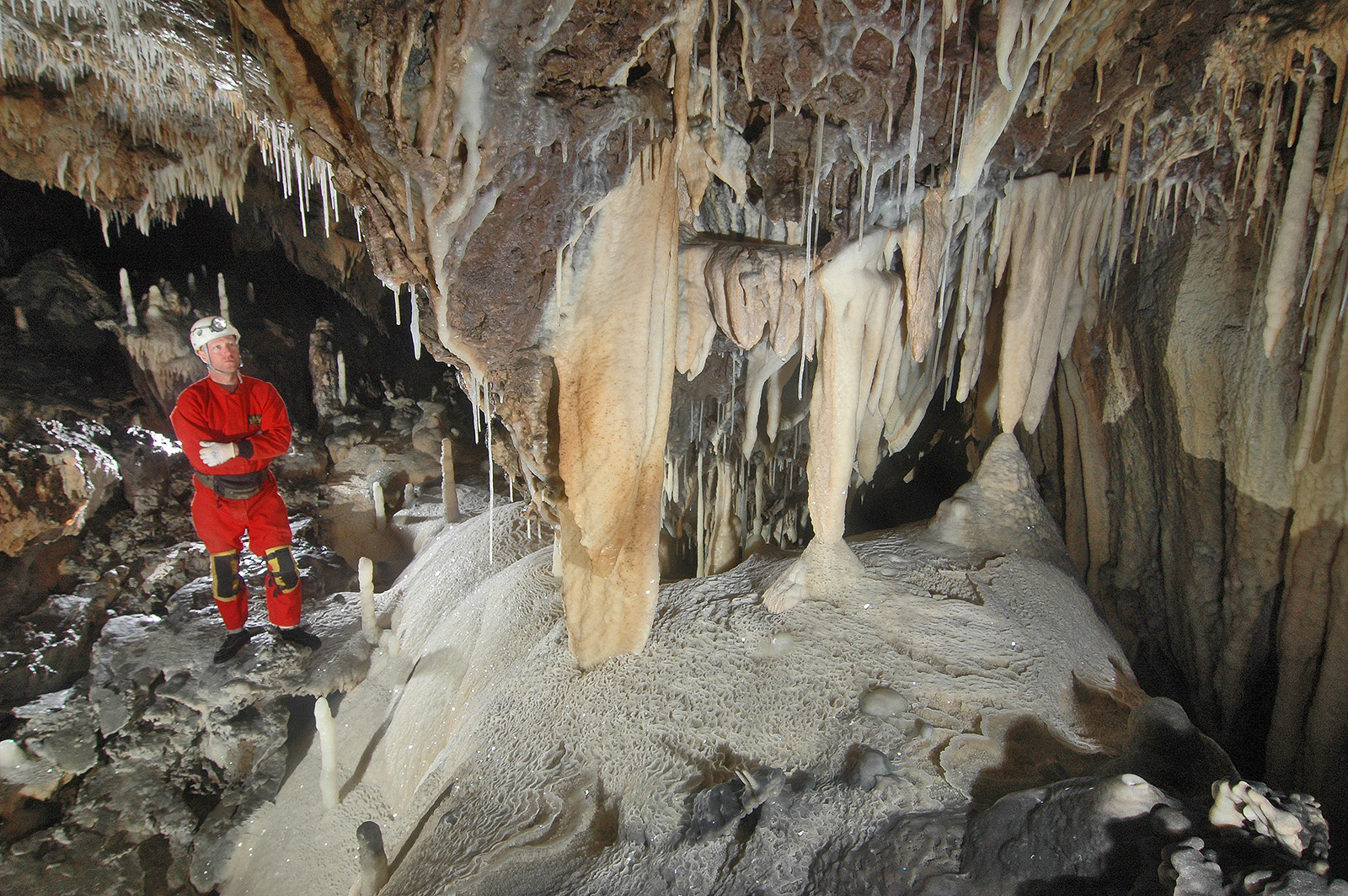
Speleothems in Ursa Minor Cave

Ursa Minor Cave is part of Sequoia National Park, a naturally formed system of caves in California's Sierra Nevada. The cave was discovered in August 2006 by four cave explorers from the Cave Research Foundation who found a softball-sized hole on a cliff face in the mountains. After widening the hole to allow for human entry, the explorers discovered one of the most spectacular caves in the western United States. The cave has since been named "Ursa Minor," because of the large bear skeleton found in the cave.

The cave was featured in the September 2007 issue of National Geographic magazine and has attracted many scientists and researchers interested in finding new species of troglobites, organisms that live in the complete darkness afforded by caves. Similar caves such as the Kaweah Cave and Lost Soldiers Cave have yielded over twenty new species of these exotic and rare creatures, whose entire populations are sometimes limited to only a single pool of water or room of a cave.

Access to this sensitive cave is currently limited to scientific and survey trips.
