= Hall City Cave =

Cave in California, United States

Coordinates: 40°24′41″N 123°00′43″W

The Hall City Cave is a limestone cave system near Hayfork, California, United States. Exploration was documented in 1903, with a Permian age ammonite fossil discovered.

A cavern in the Hall City Cave contains a deep shaft of water.

The Hall City Cave was a sacred place for the Nor-el-muk and other Wintu Native Americans. Edith Van Allen Murphy interviewed a long-surviving Wintu woman named Lucy; the papers are kept at the Held-Poage Museum in Ukiah, California in the Estle Beard Notes, box 2, Notebook g, p 15

== Treasure ==
The cave is purported to contain a treasure consisting of $40,000 in gold. The story goes that two miners carrying the gold were ambushed and murdered by two natives. The natives were tracked down by a posse who demanded to be told the location of the gold. The natives stated that they had dropped the gold in a water-filled shaft at the back of the cave. However, there appears to be no newspaper reports of this particular ambush and murders, though there is a report of two miners being murdered and the gold being buried on one of the river flats of the upper Trinity River.

In 2012, a DIY open-source remotely operated vehicle (OpenROV) was used to explore the shaft.
