= Onyx Cave (Arizona) =

Cave in Arizona

- Location within Arizona
- Location: Santa Rita Mountains, Santa Cruz County, Arizona
- Coordinates: 31°43′3″N 110°46′9″W
- Length: 0.5 miles (1 km)
- Geology: Permian limestone
- Entrances: 1
- Access: Gated

Onyx Cave is a solutional cave system with about 0.5 miles (0.8 km) of passages formed in Permian limestone in the Santa Rita Mountains of Arizona. It is part of the Coronado National Forest. It was designated a National Natural Landmark in 1974.

== History ==
The cave became a favorite spot to explore in the 1940s and 1950s. Vandals broke the formations and used paint on many walls to the point that the entrance was gated in 1962 in order to preserve it. Shortly afterwards the entrance was dynamited but was gated once again in 1974. Today access is controlled by Escabrosa Grotto, Inc.

== See also ==
- Cave Of The Bells
