= Rushmore Cave =

Cave in South Dakota, United States

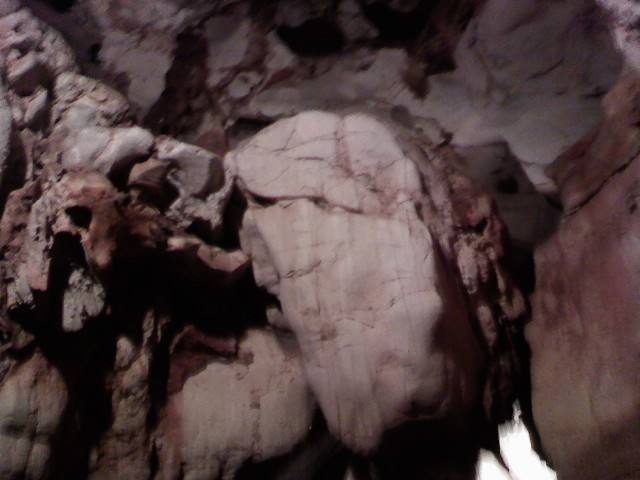
Rushmore Cave

Rushmore Cave is the closest show cave to Mount Rushmore National Memorial in the United States. It contains a wide variety of natural formations. It is the ninth longest cave in South Dakota. It measures a distance of 3,652.6 feet (1,113.3 m).

It was discovered in 1876 when a log flume that supplied water to mining operations in town of Hayward broke and spilled onto the side of the hill. As the water flowed down the hill it started flowing into a small hole in the hillside. The local miners who went up to fix the flume noticed this abnormality and became suspicious of where this water was going. After fixing the flume, the men decided to go inside and explore. After about 30 feet (9.1 m), the men came to a large drop off which went down about 15 feet (4.6 m). They exited the cave, and went out into the woods where they cut down a tree and then used this tree as a ladder to access the cave. The miners then noticed that the majority of the cave was made out of limestone. Knowing that limestone doesn't contain any gold deposits, they abandoned the cave as a mining opportunity, and left it alone. Some of the local townspeople heard news of this discovery, and became very curious as to what they might find inside the cave.

The cave was created by a very long process stretching over a 360 million year time period. It started during the Mississippian Period, during which the entire Black Hills area was covered by a large inland sea. In this sea lived many kinds of sea creatures, and crustaceans. As these sea creatures died, their bodies sunk down to the sea floor. The flesh rotted away leaving behind many solid bone fragments which then compressed, and over time hardened into a rock known as limestone.

The cave has a cornucopia of rooms including the Entrance Room, Post Office, Image Room, Big Room, Fairyland, Rope Room, Geode Room, The Rouge Room (Party Room), Arrowhead Room, and the Floral Room.

The cave also includes boxwork and many dripstone formations including stalactites, stalagmites, columns, helictites and flowstone.
