= Woodstock (Wilmington, Delaware) =

Historic house in Delaware, US

- U.S. National Register of Historic Places
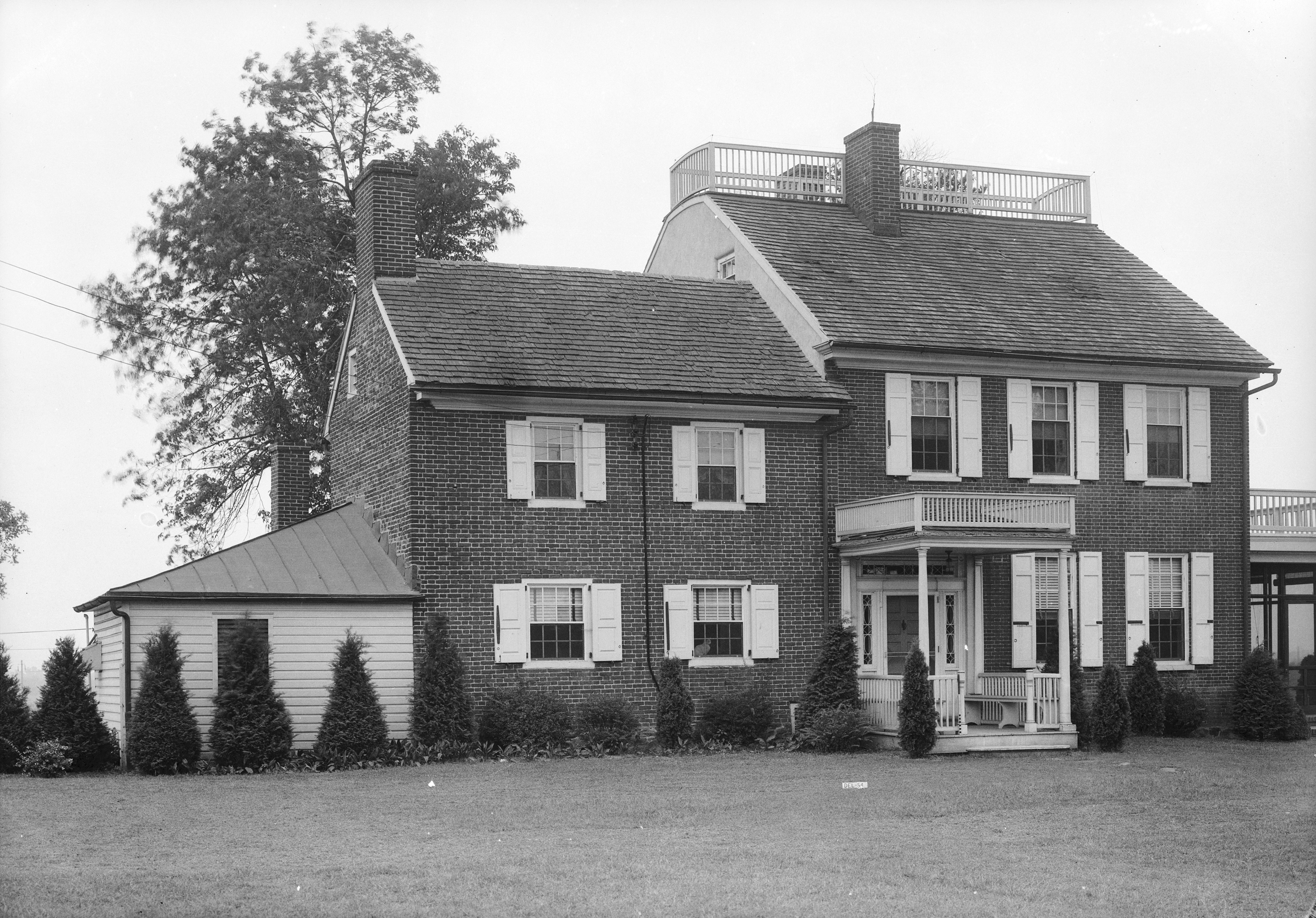
- Woodstock, HABS Photo, September 1936

- Location within Delaware Location within the United States
- Location: 102 Middleboro Rd., Wilmington, Delaware
- Coordinates: 39.72182°N 75.58997°W
- Area: 156 acres (63 ha)
- Built: c. 1743, 1833
- NRHP reference No.: 73000551
- Added to NRHP: September 7, 1973

Woodstock, also known as Banning Park, is a historic home located at Wilmington, New Castle County, Delaware. The house was restored in 1929.

The "Woodstock" house stands at the highest point of the park, with a view of the Delaware and Christina rivers and their surrounding marshes. The house is of brick, with a two-story east wing said to have been built in 1743, and a two-and-one half story west wing built-in 1833. The addition of porches (front, side, and rear) and a kitchen shed during the 1930s are the only modern changes. On the roof of the newer and taller wing is a "widow's walk" surrounded by a balustrade.

Two sheds attached to the eastern wing are old but cannot be dated. Granite hitching posts and a mounting block stand near the entrance. The inside of the building presents contrast between its 18th- and 19th-century sections. The older section has rough-finished walls and low ceiling. The newer section is more refined, indicating not only the passage of one hundred years, but also the increased fortunes of the owners. On the lower floor of the 1743 wing is located the kitchen/parlor of the original building. A winding staircase leads to the floor above, and there is a root cellar underneath. A Dutch oven with original hardware and wrought iron door can be found in the fireplace of this room. The hardware in both sections is original. On the westerly side of the main floor in the newer section can be found large nine-over-nine windows. These rooms are distinctive for their imported marble fireplaces and original wood trim and hardware. The larger section features a side-hall, double-pile plan. The classic stairwell and broad passageways add to the spacious feeling of the interior. The second floor also contains handsome fireplaces, but made with wooden mantels. The one-half story above the newer section also contains two rooms which are notable for their inside shutters. Behind a doorway in the hall is a stairway leading to the second attic and the "widow's walk."

Tradition states that one of Delaware's most famous ghosts still lives in "Woodstock," haunting on the full moon and leaving signs of his tragic death at the foot of the stairs.

156 acres of parkland comprise the present-day Banning Park. This is the last remaining intact plantation property along the Christina River. The land title can be traced back through records to approximately 1659, when the Swede Andries Andriessen settled on the north bank of the Christina.

The property changed hands several times until 1687 when John Richardson, a Quaker merchant from New Castle, purchased the property. Richardson planned to develop a milling community under the name of Middleburg, or Middleboro. It is believed that his son, John Richardson, II, lived on or near the property from about 1704. Richardson II, built a new and larger house further up on the hill at the present site of "Woodstock."

The exact date of this new house is not known; however, we do know he built an addition in 1743, as he referred to it in his will of 1752. This addition is thought to be the smaller east wing of the present building. The older section, built between 1704 and 1743 was torn down in 1833 when the present main house was built. John Richardson II, and his several brothers developed on the northern bank of the Christina a series of mills, farming properties, and warehouses and docks. John Richardson II, passed on the property to John Richardson IV, his grandson. Since John Richardson, IV, left no will, the property went to Ann, daughter of John II. She married Dr Henry Latimer in 1779. Dr. Latimer was an active participant in the Revolution and a central figure in early Delaware politics. The Latimers were often guests of Presidents Adams and Jefferson, and "Woodstock" was the center of society and influence along the Christina. The home and farm were passed on intact through the Latimer family to James Latimer Banning.

Previous to his acquiring the property, "Woodstock" had remained vacant for some time. In 1929 Mr. Banning and his wife, Jane E. Gray Banning, set about restoring it.

It was added to the National Register of Historic Places in 1973.

The Woodstock house is currently occupied as part of a resident curatorship program run by New Castle County.
