= Warren's Cave =

Cave in Florida, US

Coordinates: 29.7155214°N 82.4787216°W

Warren's Cave (or Warren Cave) is a dry karst cave in Alachua County, Florida. It is the longest dry cave in Florida, with more than 4 miles (6.4 km) of mapped passages. The cave is located on the margin of the Cody Scarp near the San Felasco Hammock Preserve State Park, northwest of the city of Gainesville. The property on which the entrance to Warren's Cave is located, the Warren Cave Nature Preserve, is owned by the National Speleological Society. Warren's cave was probably formed by a high water table when sea levels in the Quaternary Period were elevated close to 100 feet (30 m) above current sea level, corresponding to the Wicomico terrace.

By local tradition, Warren's cave was discovered by and named after Colonel John Warren, who led government troops at the Battle of San Felasco Hammock during the Second Seminole War. The cave was a popular local attraction in the late 19th century, mentioned in tourist guides. Wooden stairs were built leading to the entrance of the cave in a sinkhole in an attempt to make it a commercial attraction. Only some 400 feet (120 m) of passages were known until 1959. Since then, the discovery of several narrow passages ('squeezes') has greatly extended the known part of the cave.
