= Spook Cave =

Cave in Iowa, United States

Coordinates: 43.034480°N 91.308609°W

Spook Cave is a flooded cave located about seven miles (11 km) west of McGregor in rural Clayton County, Iowa. It is privately owned and operated as a tourist attraction offering escorted boat rides into the cave. The cave was first discovered in 1953 and opened for business in 1955.

The cave entrance is located on a 93-acre (38 ha) property that also includes a campground and cabins.

The cave is in the drainage of Bloody Run Creek, a small tributary of the Upper Mississippi River. A lock and dam maintain water levels sufficient for boat access; the cave's stream is allowed to drain to its natural, shin-high depth during the winter. Geologically, the cave is in the Driftless Area of Iowa, a region characterized by karst topography, caves, sinkholes, disappearing streams, and cold springs.
