= Cave of the Bells =

Geographic location

Coordinates: 31°43′44″N 110°46′06″W

Cave of the Bells is located in Sawmill Canyon on the eastern slopes of the Santa Rita Mountains of Santa Cruz County, Arizona. The cave contains a lake which is 80 meters below the entrance level. The lake has been measured at 76 °F (24 °C) and is believed to be warmed by sources below. Nearby Onyx Cave is also of interest.

== Access ==
Access to the cave is by reservation and a key security deposit. Permits and keys are accessible at the Forest Supervisor's Office.
