= Spring Valley Caverns =

Cave system in Minnesota

Spring Valley Caverns is a cave system in southeastern Minnesota near Spring Valley, Minnesota in Fillmore County. The region is within the Driftless Area, a region noted for its karst topography, which includes caves and sinkholes.

Located on the privately owned Cave Preserve, the system measures over 5 3/4 miles in length, making it the largest privately owned system in Minnesota. It is listed as the 138th longest in the United States.

In 1966, Jon Henry Latcham discovered one half mile of cave passages on his property. After discovering the cave, Latcham decided to commercialize the cave with his neighbor Roger Winters. Together, they hired contractors to construct a road to the cave, bring electricity into the cave, and place a World War II Quonset building over the entrance to the cave. Finally, in 1968, they opened the cave to the public for tours. However, a year later Latcham lost the cave due to foreclosure, and it was sold to a new owner who kept the cave open to the public until 1971. In 1989, John Ackerman purchased the cave, and remains the present owner. Ackerman progressively discovered five more miles of cave segments. He has continued to acquire easements for cave rights in adjacent regions and installed artificial entrances for safe access into and out of the caves. Spring Valley Caverns is one of 38 caves located on the Cave Preserve. Ackerman details the history and discoveries on his website. Entry is available to scientists, select nature groups, and Minnesota Caving Club members and is tightly controlled.
