= Horse Caves =

Geological feature in Granby, Massachusetts

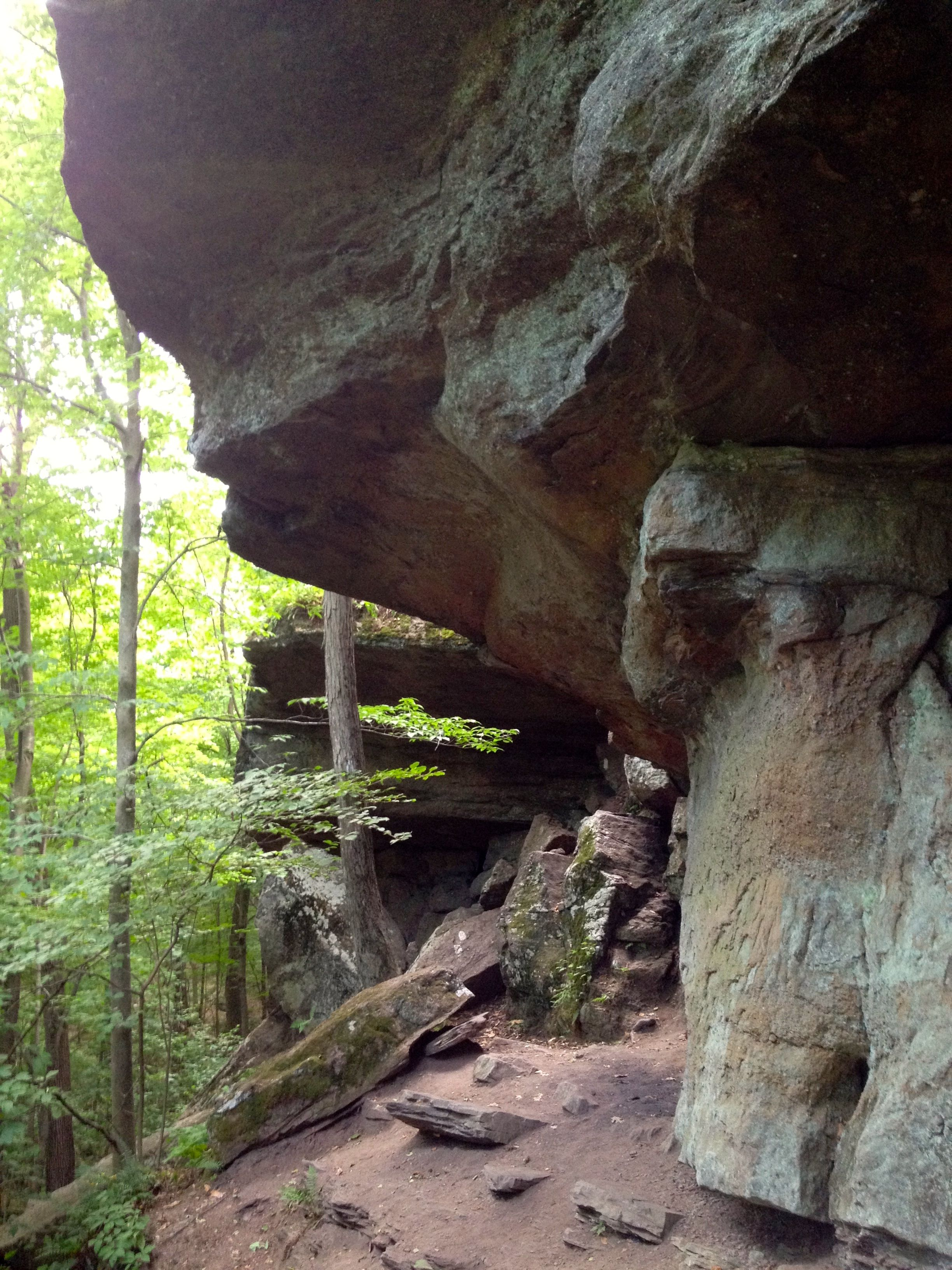
- The Horse Caves
- Interactive map of Horse Caves
- Location: Granby, Massachusetts
- Coordinates: 42°18′19″N 72°30′30″W
- Elevation: 254 m (833 ft)
- Difficulty: Easy

The Horse Caves of Granby, Massachusetts, are a geological feature in the Holyoke Range. These caves are really ledges. They are found along the New England National Scenic Trail to the east of the summit of Mount Norwottuck.

According to legend, some of the men fighting with Daniel Shays in Shays' Rebellion hid out in the Horse Caves after their defeat at the hands of the Massachusetts militia.
