= Clarks Cave =

Cave in Bath County, Virginia, United States

Coordinates: 38.1°N 79.7°W

- Interactive map of Clarks Cave
- Location: Bath County
- Length: 6.43 miles
- Entrances: 6

Clarks Cave is a cave in Bath County, Virginia. It is a major paleontological site, and was mined for saltpeter in the 1800s. The cave is 6.43 miles, and has 6 entrances. It is considered an excellent example of a joint-controlled cave, with an extensive maze of passages than run along joints in the rock, a Lower Devonian limestone.

== Paleontology ==
The remains of 142 species of vertebrate and 35 species of invertebrate have been found within the cave.
