= Gardner Cave =

Cave in Washington state, United States

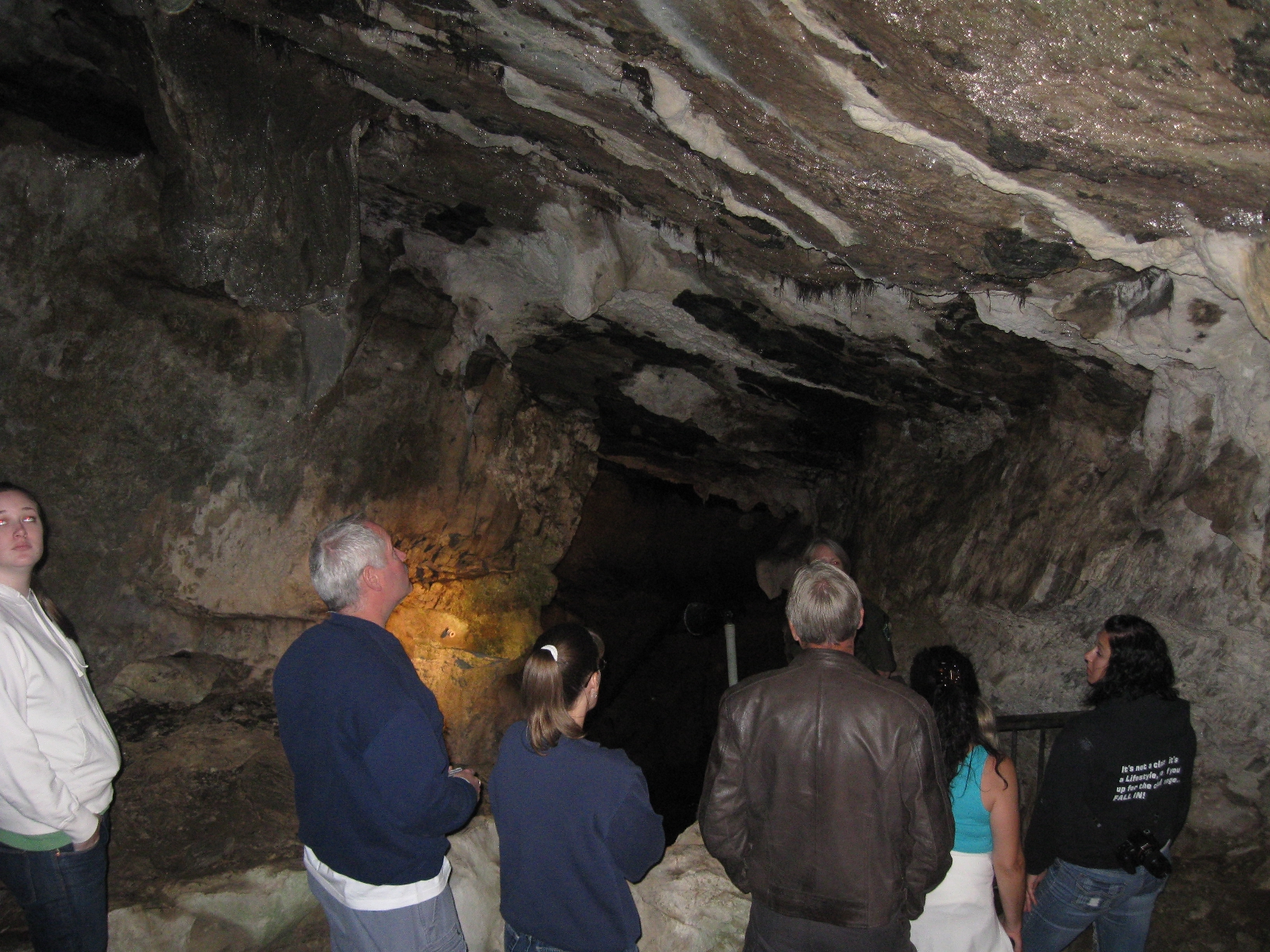
- Guided tour of the cave, 2009
- Interactive map of Gardner Cave
- Location: Crawford State Park
- Coordinates: 48°59′40.56″N 117°22′13.8″W
- Length: 1,055 feet (322 m)
- Geology: Metaline Limestone, Cambrian formation

Gardner Cave is located in extreme northeastern Washington state inside Crawford State Park. Gardner Cave is the longest limestone cave in Washington state with a length of 1,055 feet (322 m). Only the first 494 feet (151 m) are open to public access.

The cave is adorned with stalactites, stalagmites, flowstone, pools, and a column 2 feet in diameter.

== History ==
A local bootlegger named Ed Gardner claimed to have discovered the cave in 1899 when the earth collapsed beneath him and his horse. He stored his moonshine in the cave because it had a constant temperature of 39 °F (4 °C). According to one account, Mr. Gardner lost his deed to the cave and adjacent lands to William Crawford in a game of poker. In 1921, Mr. Crawford deeded the 40 acres (16 ha) of land with the cave on it to Washington State Parks.

== Geology ==
The cave formed within Metaline Limestone, a formation from the Cambrian. The surrounding area has been glaciated in at least the last two glacial advances. Several underground stream channels enter the cave near the Mud Room, the furthest section from the entrance, and a seasonal lake occurs when the area is not completely flooded.
