= Tyson Spring Cave =

Cave in southeastern Minnesota

Coordinates: 43.7550°N 92.2281°W

Tyson Spring Cave is a cave located in southeastern Minnesota's Fillmore County. The region is within the Driftless Area, a region noted for its karst topography, which includes caves and sinkholes. Tyson's cave is a solutional cave privately owned by the Minnesota Cave Preserve. It is known for the extinct ice-age bones found scattered throughout the cave rooms. The majority of this extensive cave is approximately 120 feet below the surface and is estimated to be 3.5–5 miles in length, making it the 258th longest cave in the United States.

== History ==
After the War of 1812, the United States deeded a parcel of land containing the natural entrance to Tyson Spring Cave to a war widow, who then deeded the property to Mr. Harper Tyson in 1862. Residents of Fillmore County would venture into the cave using wooden boats but were prevented from going any further than 800 feet because the passage was completely submerged in water. In the 1980s, local caver Roger Kehret began removing piles of rocks near the entrance in hopes of lowering the water level enough to pass through the sump. In 1985, Larry Laine and Steve Porter used SCUBA gear to dive through and reported that the cave indeed did continue into the unknown. Shortly thereafter, Roger Kehret and Dave Gerboth assisted John Ackerman in removing a constriction that lowered the water level enough for them to enter the cave without diving gear. John was the first non-diver to enter the cave, and alone, he ventured deeper. He eventually reached the end of the cave system and reported his findings to the scientific community. Since the cave could only be accessed during low water conditions, very few cavers entered this cave over the next 20 years.

In 2006, John Ackerman, owner of the Minnesota Cave Preserve, purchased the land above the cave, along with 143 acres of subterranean rights as they pertain to the cave system. The preserve created a 124-foot entrance shaft to allow safe entry into the cave and placed a gate at the natural entrance to prevent unauthorized access. Entry is available to scientists, select nature groups, and Minnesota Caving Club members and is tightly controlled. In 2008, John Ackerman and two fellow cavers found an ancient stag moose antler, which initiated the discovery of over 175 extinct ice-age bones.

== Bone discovery ==
In 2008, Ackerman and several other cavers began to excavate a side passage in the cave and discovered an ancient bone. He brought the bone to David Mather at the St. Paul History Center, who was able to identify it as part of an elk or moose, but was unable to identify the exact species. The bone was then sent to the Illinois State Museum's assistant curator, Chris Widga. The Illinois State Museum identified the ancient bone to be a prehistoric Stag-Moose (Cervalces scotti) antler, which is the first record of a stag-moose in Minnesota. Shortly thereafter, Chris Widga was examining the discovery site of the antler when he discovered the skull to an ancient saber-tooth cat (Homotherium serum), which is the first record of a saber-tooth cat in the Great Lakes region. The nearest discovery of a saber-tooth cat is in northern Arkansas. The Rafter Radiocarbon National Isotope Center in New Zealand used radiocarbon dating to identify that the Saber-tooth cat lived approximately 27,000 years ago. Paleontologists were stunned when Penn State lab successfully amplified and sequenced DNA from the extinct saber-tooth cat. Since the discovery of the stag-moose antler and the saber-tooth cat skull, more than 175 ancient bones dating between 27,590 and 26,200 years old have been found in Tyson Spring Cave and Bat River Cave.
