= Federal Cave Resources Protection Act of 1988 =

United States federal law to preserve caves

The Federal Cave Resources Protection Act of 1988 or FCRPA is a United States federal law that aims "to secure, protect, and preserve significant caves on Federal lands for the perpetual use, enjoyment, and benefit of all people; and to foster increased cooperation and exchange of information between governmental authorities and those who utilize caves located on Federal lands for scientific, education, or recreational purposes." The law was approved on November 18, 1988. Specific effects of the act include prohibiting the disclosure of locations of significant caves, removing cave resources, and vandalizing or disturbing cave resources.

== History ==
The original draft for the FCRPA started as a cave management plan for the Forest Service Directive System (FSM). Tom Lennon of Washington Office Recreation met with cavers Jer Thornton and Jim Nieland to discuss the scope of cave management. In one evening, a paper draft of the plan was written up and titled FSM 2356. Lennon then escorted the bill through official channels where it was then adopted by FSM.

Later, Thornton, along with the help of the National Speleological Society (NSS) and the American Cave Conservation Association (ACCA), stepped up to get a federal bill passed. Thornton used the FSM 2356 as the basis for this new bill. The bill was introduced with the help of Congressman Frederick C. Boucher of Virginia on March 2, 1987. Senator Tom Daschle of South Dakota introduced a similar bill in the Senate and by November of next year it was signed into law by President Ronald Reagan.

A major difference between FSM 2356 and the FCRPA is the concept of "significant" caves. The FCRPA introduced this new aspect, where a cave must be recognized as significant in order to receive protection under the Act. This meant not all caves received protection, only those recognized as significant by the Federal government through a nomination process.

The original nomination process began in 1994 which was required by the newly passed law. A national clearing house was established to oversee this initial process of nominations. The initial batch of cave nominations needed to meet only two criteria: they had to be on federal land and be natural features; not man-made.

== See also ==
- Cave conservation
