= Crystal Cavern =

Cave in Alabama

Crystal Cavern(s), also known throughout the years as Alabama Caverns and McClu(n)ney Cave, is a small cavern containing crystal formations located in Clay, Alabama, USA.

== History ==
The cavern was discovered in 1840 by a Thomas McCluney. It was mined for saltpeter during the Civil War (1861 to 1865).

The cavern was a tourist attraction for Clay. It opened and closed in 1927 as Alabama Caverns, but had reopened and been renamed to "Crystal Caverns" by 1941, when the WPA Guide to Alabama recorded that it was electrically lit, that its admission price was 25 cents (equivalent to $5 in 2024), and that it had "beautiful formations" including what appeared to be "metallic draperies". In 1946, however, biologist Edward McCrady described it as "the poorest commercialized cave [he'd] ever seen". In the early 1960s, the facilities were upgraded. The Congressional Record of 1966 recorded it as having camping facilities that included showers and restrooms, and described it as a "fairyland". It closed as a tourist attraction in the late 1960s, and is now privately owned.

During the Cold War, the cavern was designated as a fallout shelter for up to 1045 people.

== Geology ==
The cavern is part of the Chickamauga Limestone (Note: See the specification from the United States Geological Survey), lies approximately 100 feet (30 m) above the Copper Ridge Dolomite, and formed along a strike joint when the Appalachian Mountains folded at the end of the Paleozoic. It was reported in 1933 as extending as a narrow passage for 800 feet, with several right angle turns, and having a maximum height of either "about 80 feet" or "67 feet." Cave formations included "onyx crusts and rosettes", stalactites and stalagmites, and "a petrified waterfall". Two named formations were the "Capitol Dome", part of a wall resembling the United States Capitol dome, and the "Family Loft", a high recess containing two large columns along with smaller stalagmites. Siliceous dolomite extruded from the walls and at one point formed a bridge. This was caused by a solution channel (a void in the limestone which allows passage of water) above and below the dolomite bed.

The cavern contained a spring in a pit which, in 1933, was about 20 feet above the water table, and fed by a "slight drip during wet seasons." In 1946, McCrady reported the pool to be less than a foot deep, and clear.

== Fauna ==
The cavern has been the sole reported location of the pseudoscorpion Aphrastochthonius pecki, described in 1968, and one of two local locations reported for Peck's cave snail (Glyphyalinia pecki), which was described in 1966. The McCluney cave cricket (Euhadenoecus insolitus), a regional species, was described in 1978 from a pair of specimens collected at the cavern by Peck in 1965. A white salamander was seen in the cave's pool by Walter B. Jones, however McCrady found the pool devoid of life, and believed the salamander to have accessed the cave via one of its many cracks.

== See also ==
- List of caves in the United States
