= Tory's Cave (Springfield, Vermont) =

Cave in Vermont (US)

Coordinates: 43.2778°N 72.4186°W

Tory's Cave is in Springfield, Vermont, across the Connecticut River from Charlestown, New Hampshire.

The cave has two entrances, one of which has a commanding view of the river. The cave contains a room large enough to accommodate several people.

In 1781, Shem Kemfield, a Tory from Charlestown, New Hampshire, and several companions lived in the cave for a short time.
