= Domtar mine =

Gypsum mine in Michigan, United States

Domtar Mine
- Location in Michigan
- Location: Walker, Michigan, Michigan, USA; 42°57′5″N 085°42′32″W
- Products: gypsum
- Opened: before 1860

The Domtar Mine, formed from the consolidation of Grand Rapids Gypsum Company mines 1 & 2, is an inactive underground gypsum mine in Walker, a suburb of Grand Rapids, Michigan.

== History ==
The Grand Rapids Gypsum Company was incorporated in 1860, but the mines pre-dates this incorporation. The mine is located in the city of Walker, just southwest of Grand Rapids, north of the Grand River. The original mine entrances were both north and south of Butterworth Drive, named after the pioneering mining magnate, R.E. Butterworth, who opened the first gypsum mines north of the Grand River in this area.

== Pellerito Cave ==
A small gypsum solutional cave, known as the Pellerito Cave (named after its founder, Russell Pellerito) was discovered during the mining operations.

== Domtar purchase ==
The mine was purchased by Domtar industries in 1983, and re-opened in 1984 as the Domtar mine. Domtar sold their gypsum operations to Georgia-Pacific, who closed the mine in 1999. It was the last operating underground gypsum mine in Michigan.
