= Cave gate =

Cave entrance barricade

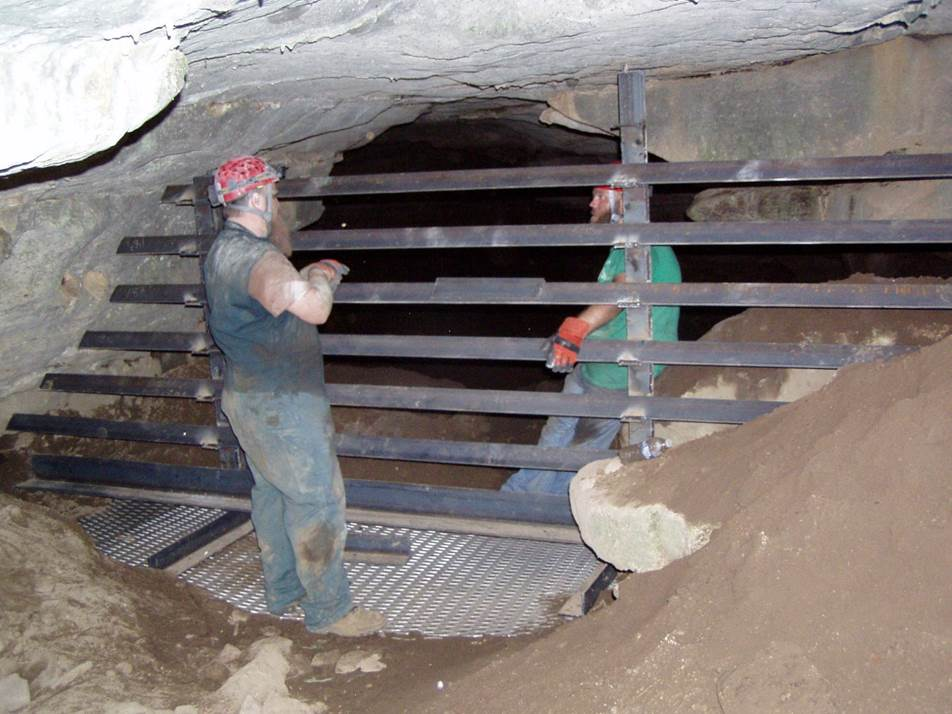
A bat-friendly gate in Coleman Cave in Cookeville, Tennessee

A cave gate is a manmade barricade typically placed at, or just inside, the entrance to a cave in an effort to impede or mitigate human access to a cave's interior. The reason for gating a cave can be varied, but may include protecting sensitive or endangered bat species, protecting fragile cave resources, or restricting access to dangerous caves.

In the United States, an "industry standard" for gate construction has been developed. This standard has been widely used by agencies such as the National Park Service, U.S. Fish and Wildlife, Bureau of Land Management, U.S. Forest Service, The Nature Conservancy, National Speleological Society and others. This standard focuses on proper gate placement that does not hinder airflow that would change a cave's micro-ecosystem.

The industry standard or "Basic Gate Design" is a vertically placed flat grid of horizontal bars. The spacing of the bar grid is crucial to allow access of small animals, such as bats, but restricting human entry. Other designs exist, but spacing of the bar grid appears to be universal.
