= List of caves in Missouri =

Distribution of karst features in Missouri: darker red indicates greater cave density; losing stream courses are shown in yellow; blue spots indicate known springs.

This list of caves in Missouri includes the location, length, and date they were opened to the public (or discovered).

There are roughly 7,500 caves recorded in the state. Based on that, Missouri has become known as the Cave State. One of the reasons for the vast number of caves is that Slightly acidic rainwater can easily dissolve the carbonate bedrock underlying many parts of the state.

The Ozarks region has a well-developed karst topography with numerous areas of sinkholes, stream capture, and cavern development.

== Caves ==
The following is a list of caves in Missouri.

| Cave | Image | County | Length | Discovery Year | Notes |
|---|---|---|---|---|---|
| Berome Moore Cave | | Perry | 24.5 mi (39.4 km) | 1961 | |
| Bluff Dweller's Cave | | McDonald | 4,000 ft (1,200 m) | 1927 | |
| Bridal Cave | | Camden | 1 mi (1.6 km) | 1948 | |
| Carroll Cave | | Camden | 22 mi (35 km) | 1954 | |
| Crevice Cave | | Perry | 31.2 mi (50.2 km) | 1961 | |
| Crystal Cave | | Greene | 250 ft (76 m) | 1893 | |
| Current River Cavern | | Carter | 2,384 ft (727 m) | 1940 | |
| Devil’s Icebox Cave | | Boone | 5.76 mi (9.27 km) | 1924 | |
| Devils Well | | Shannon | 400 ft (120 m) | 1954 | |
| Fantastic Caverns | | Greene | 1 mi (1.6 km) | 1862 | |
| Gourd Creek Cave | | Phelps | 20 ft (6.1 m) | 1870s | |
| Graham Cave | | Montgomery | 93 ft (28 m) | 1847 | |
| Jacobs Cavern | | McDonald | 1 mi (1.6 km) | 1903 | |
| Mark Twain Cave | | Marion | 3 mi (4.8 km) | 1886 | originally McDowell's Cave |
| Marvel Cave | | Stone | 2,640 ft (800 m) | 1894 | |
| Meramec Caverns | | Franklin | 4.6 mi (7.4 km) | 1935 | |
| Onondaga Cave | | Crawford | 1 mi (1.6 km) | 1897 | |
| Onyx Cave | | Pulaski | 2,640 ft (800 m) | 1892 | also known as King Cave and Boiling Springs Cave |
| Ozark Caverns | | Camden | 1 mi (1.6 km) | 1880s | |
| Picture Cave | | Warren | 0 ft (0 m) | | length not given |
| Research Cave | | Callaway | 0 ft (0 m) | 1950 | length not given |
| Riverbluff Cave | | Greene | 2,000 ft (610 m) | 2001 | |
| Round Spring Caverns | | Shannon | 1 mi (1.6 km) | 1932 | |
| Saltpeter Cave | | Phelps | 1.5 mi (2.4 km) | 1860 | originally Friede's Cave |
| Talking Rocks Cavern | | Stone | 225 ft (69 m) | 1969 | originally Fairy Cave |
| Tavern Cave | | Franklin | 120 ft (37 m) | 1969 | also known as the Taverne-A Cave |
| Tumbling Creek Cave | | Taney | 2 mi (3.2 km) | 1804 | |

== See also ==
- List of caves in the United States
- Geography of Missouri#Caves
