= List of National Natural Landmarks in Missouri =

There are 16 National Natural Landmarks in Missouri.

Missouri National Natural Landmarks (clickable map)

Name	Image	Date	Location	County	Ownership	Description
Big Oak Tree State Park		May 1986	East Prairie 36°39′18″N 89°19′42″W	Mississippi	state	A rare untouched wet-mesic bottomland hardwood forest in the Mississippi Alluvial Plain, it is the home of several state and national champion trees
Carroll Cave		1977		Camden	private	Contains a dendritic system of subsurface karst streams and tributaries.
Cupola Pond		1974		Ripley	federal	One of the most ancient sinkhole ponds in the Ozark plateaus. Located in Mark Twain National Forest.
Golden Prairie		1975	Golden City 37°21′45″N 94°09′01″W	Barton	private	An unplowed remnant of the tall grass prairie ecosystem.
Grand Gulf State Park		June 1971	Thayer 36°31′27″N 91°32′38″W	Oregon	state	An excellent example of karst topography, this canyon is a collapsed dolomite cave with a 200 feet (61 m) natural bridge. Water in this canyon emerges 9 miles (14 km) away in Mammoth Spring, Arkansas.
Greer Spring		1980	36°47′12″N 91°20′51″W	Oregon	private	Spring in the Ozarks that discharges into a high quality, cascading stream.
Maple Woods Natural Area		1980		Clay	state	Contains a nearly virgin sugar maple and mockernut hickory forest.
Maramec Spring		October 1971	St. James 37°57′19″N 91°32′11″W	Phelps	private	A natural spring, the fifth largest in the state. It has a notable trout park and a historic iron works in a privately owned park.
Mark Twain and Cameron Caves		1972	39°41′19″N 91°19′54″W	Marion	private	Exceptionally good examples of the maze type of cavern development.
Marvel Cave		1972	36°40′03″N 93°20′23″W	Stone	private	Includes one of the greatest dripstone units of all the Ozark caves.
Onondaga Cave State Park		1980	38°03′39″N 91°13′38″W	Crawford	state	Contains an unusually large and varied number of speleothems.
Pickle Springs		1975		Ste. Genevieve	state	Contains one of the finest Pleistocene relict habitats in Missouri.
Taberville Prairie Conservation Area		1975		St. Clair	state	One of the largest remaining virgin tall grass prairies.
Tucker Prairie		1975		Callaway	private	A virgin tall grass prairie occurring within the transition zone between the oak-hickory forest and typical tall grass prairie.
Tumbling Creek Cave		1980		Taney	private	Contains the most diverse fauna known for any cave west of the Mississippi River.
Wegener Woods		1975		Warren	private	An essentially virgin oak-hickory-dominated forest in a condition of gradual change to a sugar maple-dominated forest.

== See also ==
- List of National Historic Landmarks in Missouri
- List of Missouri state parks
