= List of Missouri conservation areas – Kansas City region =

Map of Missouri conservation areas with the Kansas City region highlighted

The Kansas City administrative region of the Missouri Department of Conservation encompasses Bates, Benton, Cass, Clay, Henry, Jackson, Johnson, Lafayette, Pettis, Platte, St. Clair, and Vernon counties. The regional office is located in Lee's Summit.

Conservation Area	Description	Size		County	Location
Amarugia Highlands Conservation Area	This area contains grassland, wetlands (95 acres), forest/woodlands, cropland and old fields. Facilities/features: boat ramp, fishing jetty, Amarugia Lake (55 acres), and permanent streams (South Grand River and South Fork creek).	1,039 acres	420 ha	Cass	38°32′26.18″N 94°26′3.02″W
Balltown Access	This forest and cropland area offers access to the Little Osage River.	180 acres	73 ha	Vernon	37°59′6.07″N 94°23′57.03″W
Baltimore Bend Conservation Area	This area contains river-hills forest.	1,156 acres	468 ha	Lafayette	39°13′10.02″N 93°35′45.65″W
Big Buffalo Creek Conservation Area	The area is mostly forest. Facilities/features: primitive camping, three interconnected hiking trails, Big Buffalo Lake (5 acres), three springs and two permanent streams (Big Buffalo Creek and Pole Hollow Creek). There is one Natural Area: Big Buffalo Fen Natural Area.	1,565 acres	633 ha	Morgan, Benton	38°20′35.29″N 93°4′45.28″W
Big Drywood Creek Conservation Area	This is a mostly wetlands area.	15 acres	6.1 ha	Vernon	37°50′24.93″N 94°29′25.14″W
Birdsong Conservation Area	This area is mostly forest with old fields and cropland. Facilities/features: permanent stream (Brush Creek), Brush Creek Natural Area.	422 acres	171 ha	St. Clair	37°52′1.73″N 93°42′23.57″W
Bittern Bottoms Conservation Area	This area contains wetlands and forest, including a 20-acre (81,000 m^{2}) marsh and a 13-acre (53,000 m^{2}) sedge-and-grass wet meadow.	63 acres	25 ha	Cass	38°33′44.19″N 94°24′17.90″W
Blackjack Access	This forest and grassland area offers access to Brush Creek and the Sac River. There is a boat ramp.	209 acres	85 ha	St. Clair	37°52′55.75″N 93°44′48.12″W
Brickley Hollow Conservation Area	This area contains old fields, forest, woodlands, savannas, and Cole Camp Creek (a small arm of the Lake of the Ozarks).	211 acres	85 ha	Benton	38°16′53.47″N 93°13′31.78″W
Bridger (Jim) Urban Conservation Area	This is a grassland and forest area.	320 acres	130 ha	Jackson	38°57′55.19″N 94°17′26.46″W
Bristow Conservation Area	This area contains cropland, grassland, prairie, and some forest and wetlands. There are 3 small, fishable ponds (1 acre total).	158 acres	64 ha	Vernon	37°47′33.18″N 94°15′32.55″W
Bruns Tract	Owned by the Missouri Prairie Foundation and managed by the Conservation Department. The primary management objective is to provide optimum brood-rearing and nesting cover for prairie chickens.	158 acres	64 ha	Pettis	38°37′2.55″N 93°28′3.45″W
Bryson's Hope Conservation Area	288-acre (1.17 km^{2}) area is being intensively managed for the recovery of the Greater Prairie Chicken, which is an endangered species in Missouri.	200 acres	81 ha	Pettis	38°34′59.57″N 93°28′44.47″W
Burr Oak Woods Conservation Area	This area is mostly forested, but it also features established prairies, restored glades and savannas, numerous ponds and creeks. Facilities/features: A large nature center offering exhibits and interpretive programs, picnic areas, pavilions, and 5 hiking trails.	1,067 acres	432 ha	Jackson	39°2′56.68″N 94°17′31.81″W
Bushwhacker Lake Conservation Area	This area contains prairie, forest, old fields, cropland, grassland and savanna. Facilities/features: boat ramp, primitive camping, 3 fishing jetties, fishing dock, archery range, Bushwhacker, and Willow lakes (196 acres total), and a permanent stream.	4,774 acres	1,932 ha	Vernon, Barton	37°40′14.62″N 94°24′42.26″W
Cephas Ford Access	This is an old field and forest area offering access to the Marmaton River. There is a seasonal boat ramp and primitive camping is allowed.	101 acres	41 ha	Vernon	37°57′3.69″N 94°21′11.51″W
Chapel View Prairie Conservation Area	This area is predominantly prairie with some forest and is noted for its wildflowers. There are 2 fishable ponds (2 acres total). This area has some sandstone outcrops.	384 acres	155 ha	Henry	38°13′5.60″N 93°51′22.46″W
Clear Creek Conservation Area	This area is mostly prairie with more than 200 acres (0.81 km^{2}) of woodlands. Facilities/features: 5 fishable ponds (5.2 acres total) and an intermittent stream (Clear Creek). This area has excellent deer and turkey hunting opportunities.	979 acres	396 ha	Vernon, Barton	37°38′42.88″N 94°14′5.62″W
Cooley Lake Conservation Area	This 1,348-acre (5.46 km^{2}) area includes an ancient oxbow lake (Cooley Lake), which was once the main channel of the Missouri River, and also wetlands, croplands, and a forested bluff. The area also has access to the Missouri River.	1,337 acres	541 ha	Clay	39°14′51.88″N 94°14′18.65″W
Dave Rock Conservation Area	This tract features a 44-acre (180,000 m^{2}) Designated Natural Area containing a sandstone glade, savanna, and forest.	130 acres	53 ha	St. Clair	38°7′5.99″N 93°43′45.30″W
Dorsett Hill Prairie Conservation Area	This area contains forest along with 15 acres (61,000 m^{2}) of native prairie and 18 acres (73,000 m^{2}) of old fields.	76 acres	31 ha	Cass	38°30′47.24″N 94°24′51.34″W
Douglas Branch Conservation Area	This area contains prairie, cropland, forest, pasture, and some wetlands. There are 2 fishable ponds (3 acres total).	521 acres	211 ha	Vernon	37°55′47.66″N 94°22′30.25″W
Drovers Prairie Conservation Area	This is a native prairie.	78 acres	32 ha	Pettis	38°31′53.43″N 93°17′42.98″W
Edmonson Access	This area contains forest, old fields, and Cole Camp Creek (a small arm of the Lake of the Ozarks).	104 acres	42 ha	Benton	38°19′16.90″N 93°13′56.38″W
Ferguson-Herold Conservation Area	This area contains old fields, forest, cropland, and grassland.	176 acres	71 ha	Lafayette	38°58′20.14″N 94°4′42.27″W
Fewel (Connor O) Conservation Area	This area contains old fields, forest, grassland, and cropland. There are three fishable lakes (14 acres total).	324 acres	131 ha	Henry	38°28′42.95″N 93°42′9.22″W
Flight Lake Conservation Area	This area contains 54 acres (220,000 m^{2}) of native prairie along with wetlands, forest, and old fields. Flight Lake provides 42 acres (170,000 m^{2}) of fishable water.	154 acres	62 ha	Vernon	37°52′44.63″N 94°25′26.71″W
Friendly Prairie Conservation Area	This is an unplowed native prairie. More than 260 species of plants have been identified in the area.	39 acres	16 ha	Pettis	38°33′5.47″N 93°17′45.84″W
Gama Grass Prairie Conservation Area	This area contains about 60 acres (240,000 m^{2}) of native prairie. The rest is forest.	78 acres	32 ha	Vernon	38°1′25.99″N 94°23′41.95″W
Gay Feather Prairie Conservation Area	This area is mostly prairie with a small stand of hardwoods.	111 acres	45 ha	Vernon	37°43′43.23″N 94°10′25.58″W
Gorman (The Anita B) Conservation Discovery Center	Just a 10-minute walk from the Plaza shopping area, the Discovery Center is a unique, hands-on, urban conservation education center located on 8 acres (32,000 m^{2}) in the heart of Kansas City. Open from 8 a.m. to 5 p.m. Monday through Saturday.	10 acres	4.0 ha	Jackson	39°2′24.80″N 94°34′30.37″W
Grandfather Prairie Conservation Area	Unplowed native prairie.	81 acres	33 ha	Pettis	38°34′4.02″N 93°18′20.00″W
Harmony Mission Lake Conservation Area	This area is mostly cropland, grassland, and old fields with 93-acre (380,000 m^{2}) woods. Facilities/features: boat ramp, Harmony Mission Lake (96 acres), and several small ponds (4 acres total).	1,066 acres	431 ha	Bates	38°4′56.69″N 94°25′54.72″W
Harter (James R) Conservation Area	The area is largely cropland with grassland, old fields, and forest.	453 acres	183 ha	Cass	38°35′46.25″N 94°16′12.46″W
Hartwell Conservation Area	Four miles west of Green Ridge at the intersection of Highways B and AA.	163 acres	66 ha	Pettis	38°37′32.83″N 93°29′4.43″W
Hazel Hill Lake	Old fields, grassland, cropland and forest. Facilities/features: boat ramp, fishing jetty, Hazel Hill Lake (72 acres).	504 acres	204 ha	Johnson	38°50′46.73″N 93°46′56.31″W
Hi Lonesome Prairie Conservation Area	Nearly all unplowed native prairie. There are 3 fishable ponds (2 acres total).	621 acres	251 ha	Benton	38°28′44.86″N 93°13′22.50″W
Humphrey Access	This area offers access to the Platte River.	16 acres	6.5 ha	Platte	39°20′17.31″N 94°48′45.25″W
Kahrs-Boger Park	This area contains cropland, forest, grassland, and old fields. Facilities/features: fishable pond (1 acre), permanent stream (Lake Creek).	106 acres	43 ha	Pettis	38°34′38.30″N 93°6′52.42″W
Kearn (J N Turkey) Memorial WA	Old fields, forest and cropland.	1,698 acres	687 ha	Johnson, Pettis	38°38′37.30″N 93°30′23.75″W
Kearn (W R) Memorial Conservation Area	This area is being intensely managed for prairie chickens. Cropfields have been converted to native warm-season and cool-season grasses to provide both nesting and brood-rearing cover for prairie chickens.	120 acres	49 ha	Pettis	38°36′4.21″N 93°28′33.60″W
Kendzora (Anthony and Beatrice) Conservation Area	This area provides a variety of habitats for many fish and wildlife species. The area includes 100 acres (0.40 km^{2}) of cropland that is seasonally flooded, providing both upland game and waterfowl habitats. A 35-acre (140,000 m^{2}) fishing lake and approximately 1-mile (1.6 km) of the Platte River runs through the west part of the area, providing river fishing opportunities.	789 acres	319 ha	Platte, Buchanan	39°31′38.10″N 94°38′54.12″W
Kings Prairie Access	This area contains forest and cropland. Facilities/features: permanent stream (Weaubleau Creek).	285 acres	115 ha	St. Clair	37°59′33.43″N 93°36′2.63″W
La Due Bottoms Conservation Area	This area contains cropland, old fields, forest, and grassland. There is an intermittent stream.	347 acres	140 ha	Henry	38°17′57.94″N 93°51′53.14″W
Lake City Range	In addition to the firearms range, this area contains 30 acres (120,000 m^{2}) of forest.	88 acres	36 ha	Jackson	39°4′26.94″N 94°14′37.25″W
Liberty Bend Conservation Area	This is a forest area fronting the Missouri River.	134 acres	54 ha	Clay	39°9′55.13″N 94°22′9.51″W
Lichen Glade Conservation Area	Lichen Glade Natural Area is an example of xeric habitat, which is populated by stunted trees and grasses adapted to living in dry, rocky soil.	26 acres	11 ha	St. Clair	38°3′17.37″N 93°47′33.32″W
Linscomb WA	This area contains grassland, forest, cropland and wetlands. There is a permanent stream (Simms Creek).	1,915 acres	775 ha	St. Clair	37°59′32.32″N 93°54′31.51″W
Lipton Conservation Area	Lipton Conservation Area adjoins Santa Fe Park (City of Independence).	33 acres	13 ha	Jackson	39°3′47.83″N 94°25′15.07″W
Little Bean Marsh Conservation Area	This area contains forest and wetlands. Facilities/features: viewing blind, viewing deck, Bean Lake (a 400-acre (1.6 km^{2}) oxbow), Little Bean Marsh Natural Area. The area is visited by migrating white pelicans.	440 acres	180 ha	Platte	39°29′55.07″N 95°1′10.97″W
Little Osage Prairie	This is an 80-acre (320,000 m^{2}) Designated Natural Area with a diversity of native plants.	80 acres	32 ha	Vernon	37°45′59.16″N 94°20′31.61″W
Lone Jack Lake Conservation Area	Facilities/features: boat ramp, two fishing jetties, and Lone Jack Lake (35 acres).	292 acres	118 ha	Jackson	38°53′40.53″N 94°11′54.88″W
Lost Valley Fish Hatchery	The area is mostly old fields with some forest. Facilities/features: hatchery, nature center, numerous fishless ponds, and permanent stream (Sterret Creek).	938 acres	380 ha	Benton	38°16′27.86″N 93°21′11.13″W
Maple Leaf Lake Conservation Area	This area contains a boat ramp, fishing jetties, and small ponds.	825 acres	334 ha	Lafayette	38°59′32.12″N 93°47′7.79″W
Maple Woods Natural Area	This is a forest area. Facilities/features: mature stand of sugar maples and oaks. It is a designated Natural Area.	39 acres	16 ha	Clay	39°13′48.37″N 94°32′52.66″W
Marshall (Dr Frederick) Conservation Area	This area is mixed forest, prairie, and savanna. Facilities/features: pond and permanent stream (Platte River).	177 acres	72 ha	Platte	39°19′8.64″N 94°49′8.29″W
Marshall Junction Conservation Area	This is a mostly forest area with old fields and cropland. Facilities/features: firearms range, fishable pond (.25 acre), and a permanent stream (Blackwater River).	778 acres	315 ha	Saline, Pettis	38°56′44.46″N 93°15′35.71″W
Montrose Conservation Area	This is a predominantly wetlands area with forest, some old fields and a small prairie. Facilities/features: boat ramp, primitive camping, 15 waterfowl blinds, Montrose Lake (1,600 acres).	2,443 acres	989 ha	Henry	38°18′19.58″N 93°57′40.77″W
Mora Conservation Area	This area is mostly grassland, cropland, and old fields with a small amount of forest. This area falls within the Cole Camp/Hi Lonesome focus area, which has been identified as an important landscape in the Greater Prairie Chicken Recovery Plan	589 acres	238 ha	Benton	38°31′1.32″N 93°12′31.07″W
Mount Hulda Towersite	This is a 40-acre (160,000 m^{2}) forested area.	37 acres	15 ha	Benton	38°22′15.58″N 93°6′23.07″W
Old Town Access	Mostly bottomland forest and cropland, and provides access to the Bates County Drainage Ditch. Facilities/features: boat ramp, primitive camping, 2 streams (Marais Des Cygnes River and Bates County Drainage Ditch), and an oxbow lake and fishing pond.	296 acres	120 ha	Bates	38°8′36.72″N 94°21′46.82″W
Osage Prairie Conservation Area	This tract, which contains a 615-acre (2.49 km^{2}) Designated Natural Area, is mostly native prairie along with forest, cropland, and some old fields. There are 3 small, fishable ponds (2 acres total).	1,561 acres	632 ha	Vernon	37°44′26.09″N 94°19′47.96″W
Paint Brush Prairie Conservation Area	This area is native prairie and contains Paint Brush Prairie Natural Area (74 acres).	315 acres	127 ha	Pettis	38°32′50.02″N 93°15′39.41″W
Park (Guy B) Conservation Area	This area contains forest, grassland and cropland. Facilities/features: boat ramp, fishing dock, Tobacco Hills Lake (17 acres), and permanent stream (Bee Creek).	374 acres	151 ha	Platte	39°25′26.13″N 94°48′8.19″W
Parma Woods Range and Training Center	The facility is located on 188 acres (0.76 km^{2}) of scenic bluff land above the Missouri River.	200 acres	81 ha	Platte	39°12′15.72″N 94°45′50.22″W
Peabody Conservation Area	This area is dominated by strip pits and spoil banks. Facilities/features: 2 boat ramps, 23 acres (93,000 m^{2}) of lakes and ponds.	289 acres	117 ha	Bates	38°5′49.86″N 94°27′6.12″W
Perry (Ralph and Martha) Memorial Conservation Area	This area contains forest, old fields, wetlands, cropland, and grassland. Facilities/features: primitive camping, firearms range, fishable ponds (16 acres total) and the Blackwater River.	4,179 acres	1,691 ha	Saline, Johnson, Pettis	38°55′4.85″N 93°30′53.23″W
Pinhook Access	This forested area offers access to Muddy Creek.	4 acres	1.6 ha	Pettis	38°48′31.48″N 93°10′24.10″W
Platte Falls Conservation Area	This area contains forest, cropland, old fields, and pasture. Facilities/features: boat ramps, pavilions, firearms and archery ranges, fishable ponds (2 acres total), and permanent stream (Platte River).	2,535 acres	1,026 ha	Platte	39°23′14.49″N 94°44′40.90″W
Poague (Haysler A) Conservation Area	This area is mostly forest with wetlands and old fields. Facilities/features: primitive camping and numerous ponds.	889 acres	360 ha	Henry	38°25′4.68″N 93°50′10.64″W
Reed (James A) Memorial WA	Woodlands, old fields, grassland, and wetlands. Facilities/features: boat rental, picnic areas and 3 pavilions, numerous fishing jetties, 2 fishing docks, an archery range, and 11 fishable lakes and ponds (252 acres total).	2,598 acres	1,051 ha	Jackson	38°52′7.86″N 94°19′31.82″W
Ripgut Prairie Natural Area	This area contains 140 acres (0.57 km^{2}) of native wet prairie and the Bates County Drainage Ditch.	279 acres	113 ha	Bates	38°7′0.13″N 94°20′5.08″W
Saeger Woods Conservation Area	This is a forest area with a small prairie.	20 acres	8.1 ha	Jackson	38°52′57.73″N 94°34′27.45″W
Schell-Osage Conservation Area	In addition to Truman Reservoir, this diverse area contains fishable lakes and ponds totaling about 900 acres (3.6 km^{2}). The tract also has 42 acres (170,000 m^{2}) of native prairie (Schell-Osage Prairie Natural Area), 2 boat ramps, waterfowl blinds, and a staffed office.	8,616 acres	3,487 ha	Vernon, St. Clair	38°1′11.45″N 94°3′58.39″W
Schimmel City Access	This forest area offers access to the Platte River. There is a boat ramp.	14 acres	5.7 ha	Platte	39°17′29.06″N 94°49′11.19″W
Settle's Ford Conservation Area	This area contains 2,500 acres (10 km^{2}) of opportunistic wetlands (no pumping capability) as well as old fields, cropland, and forest.	6,708 acres	2,715 ha	Bates, Cass	38°27′1.39″N 94°8′49.57″W
Sharps Station Access	This forest area offers access to the Platte River with a concrete boat ramp.	9 acres	3.6 ha	Platte	39°24′3.26″N 94°43′30.43″W
Sni-A-Bar Conservation Area	This is a forest area with a permanent stream (Sni-A-Bar Creek).	76 acres	31 ha	Lafayette	39°2′56.82″N 94°5′37.80″W
Taberville Access	This area offers access to the Osage arm of Truman Reservoir. There is a boat ramp.	6 acres	2.4 ha	St. Clair	38°0′5.60″N 93°59′44.54″W
Taberville Prairie Conservation Area	This tract contains the 1,360-acre (5.5 km^{2}) Taberville Prairie Natural Area, which as the largest such resource in the state, is registered as a National Natural Landmark.	1,692 acres	685 ha	St. Clair	38°3′1.61″N 93°58′50.84″W
Truman Reservoir Management Lands (Bethlehem)	(In Clinton) Take Highway 7 east 3 miles (4.8 km) to Highway AA, then turn south to Bethlehem WMA.	3,311 acres	1,340 ha	Henry	38°19′37.61″N 93°44′1.79″W
Truman Reservoir Management Lands (Brownington)	(In Clinton) Take Highway 13 south to Highway Z, then east to Highway BB, and north to County Road SE171 to Brownington WMA.	1,464 acres	592 ha	Henry	38°14′31.64″N 93°44′38.72″W
Truman Reservoir Management Lands (Brush Creek)	(From Clinton) Go east on Highway 7 to Highway C, then take Highway C to Highway T south to Highway TT.	3,393 acres	1,373 ha	Henry, Benton	38°20′45.73″N 93°30′1.94″W
Truman Reservoir Management Lands (Cedar Creek)	Landlocked; access by boat only. No access by land.	666 acres	270 ha	Henry	38°16′54.15″N 93°35′49.66″W
Truman Reservoir Management Lands (Deepwater Creek)	(In Clinton) Take Highway 13 south to Highway 52, then west to SW 401. Deepwater Creek WMA is east and north of SW 401.	5,571 acres	2,255 ha	Henry	38°16′52.37″N 93°47′31.34″W
Truman Reservoir Management Lands (Gallinipper Creek)	Truman Reservoir ML (Gallinipper Creek) is 4 miles (6.4 km) north of Osceola on Hwy 13, then 3 miles (4.8 km) southwest on CR NE 301.	2,082 acres	843 ha	St. Clair	38°4′22.32″N 93°43′22.61″W
Truman Reservoir Management Lands (Gouge Eye)	Truman Reservoir ML (Gouge Eye) is Highway 7 east from Clinton to Highway W, then south on Highway W to County Road SE550, then east approximately a half-mile to the cable gate.	581 acres	235 ha	Henry	38°16′25.06″N 93°38′29.44″W
Truman Reservoir Management Lands (Grand River Bottoms)	South of Clinton on Highway 13, turn west on SW 450 to Highway T, go west on T to SW 351 and turn north. Past SW 300, Grand River Bottoms is on both sides of SW 351.	6,710 acres	2,720 ha	Henry	38°19′59.64″N 93°47′46.88″W
Truman Reservoir Management Lands (Leesville)	Other than by boat, SE80 road is the only public access to the Leesville WMA.	1,933 acres	782 ha	Henry, Benton	38°19′25.09″N 93°30′30.66″W
Truman Reservoir Management Lands (Little Pomme de Terre)	Direct access to Truman Reservoir is very limited.	2,338 acres	946 ha	Benton	38°6′58.01″N 93°25′14.94″W
Truman Reservoir Management Lands (Little Tebo Creek)	Little Tebo Creek WMA has limited public access by vehicle other than near the bridge.	1,746 acres	707 ha	Benton	38°19′7.43″N 93°24′48.45″W
Truman Reservoir Management Lands (Sac Osage)	Shorebird viewing marsh is closed from October 15 until end of waterfowl season as a refuge.	6,281 acres	2,542 ha	St. Clair	38°0′1.91″N 93°44′15.43″W
Truman Reservoir Management Lands (Salt Creek)	Take Highway E north from Roscoe 2 miles (3.2 km). The area will be on both sides of the blacktop.	3,947 acres	1,597 ha	St. Clair	38°0′23.77″N 93°47′42.04″W
Truman Reservoir Management Lands (Upper Tebo Creek)	(From Clinton) Go east on Highway 7 to NE 681, then north on NE 681 to end of road.	6,960 acres	2,820 ha	Henry	38°22′25.71″N 93°34′53.53″W
Truman Reservoir Management Lands (Valhalla)	(From Lowry City) Take Highway C east 6 miles (9.7 km), then turn north on Highway HH and go until County Road NE 900 east.	1,821 acres	737 ha	St. Clair	38°9′37.19″N 93°33′52.29″W
Truman Reservoir Management Lands (Weaubleau Creek)	Take Highway 82 east from Osceola 5 miles (8.0 km), then go north on County Road NE 1025.	3,493 acres	1,414 ha	St. Clair	38°3′50.68″N 93°36′23.84″W
Union Mill Access	This area offers access to the Platte River.	0.7 acres	0.28 ha	Platte	39°30′51.01″N 94°39′24.85″W
Urich Access	This area offers access to the Grand River. There is a boat ramp.	1.9 acres	0.77 ha	Henry	38°27′10.77″N 94°0′12.65″W
Urich Conservation Area	This area consists of forest, old fields, cropland, and grassland. It has one permanent stream (Big Creek).	470 acres	190 ha	Henry	38°29′8.66″N 93°56′43.17″W
Wah-Kon-Tah Prairie	This is a prairie area with 2 small, fishable ponds.	3,067 acres	1,241 ha	Cedar, St. Clair	37°54′9.89″N 94°0′9.51″W
White Alloe Creek Conservation Area	This is a mostly forest area adjoining the Parkville Nature Sanctuary which includes the following facilities/features: picnic area, pavilion, viewing deck, and a permanent stream (White Alloe Creek).	70 acres	28 ha	Platte	39°11′43.44″N 94°40′40.29″W

== Notes ==
- Acreage and counties from MDCLand GIS file
- Names, descriptions, and locations from Conservation Atlas Online GIS file
