= St. Albans General Store =

- U.S. National Register of Historic Places
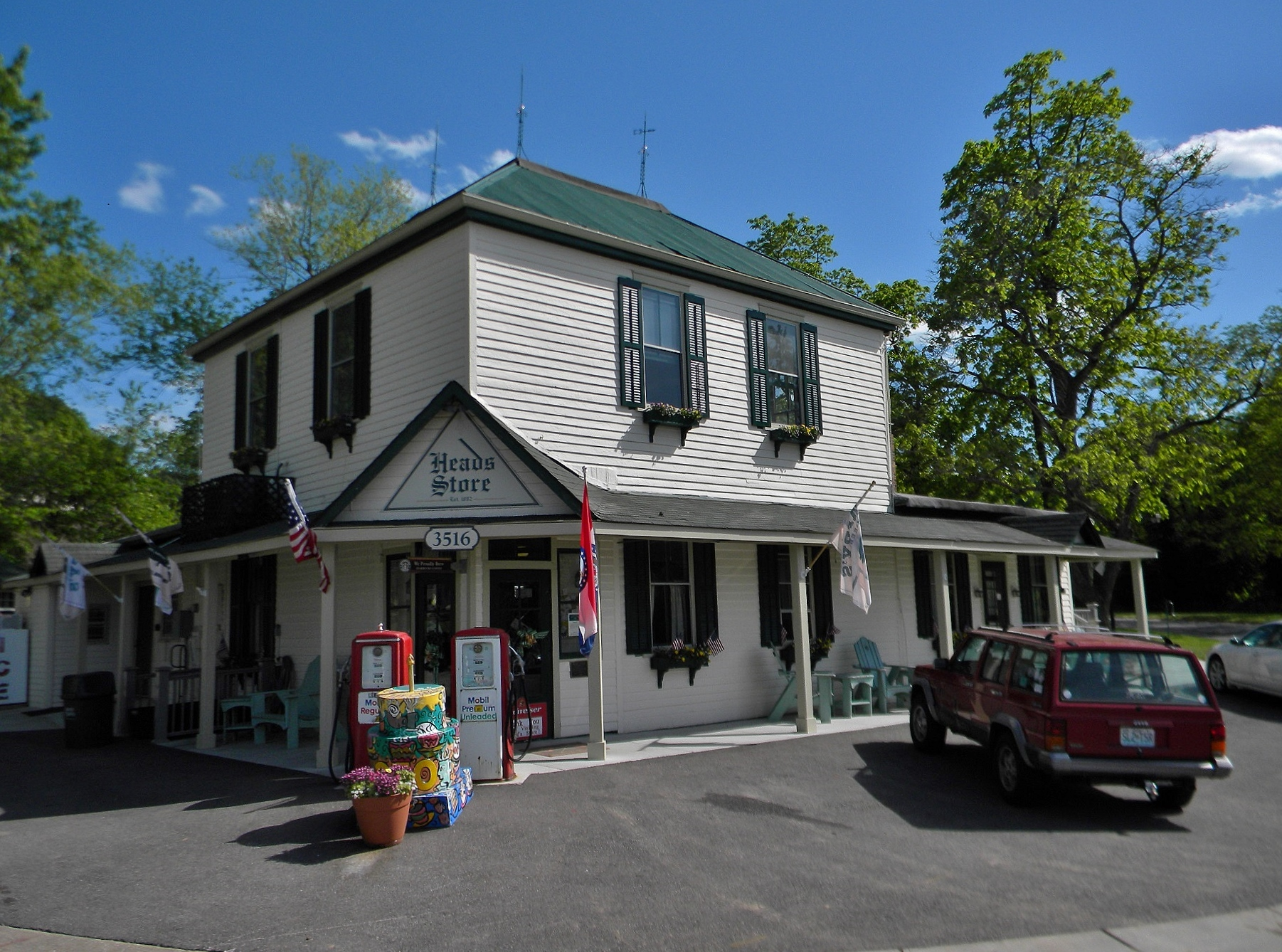
- St. Albans General Store, May 2016

- Location within Missouri Location within the United States
- Location: 3516 St. Albans Rd., St. Albans, Missouri
- Coordinates: 38°34′48″N 90°46′19″W
- Area: less than one acre
- Built: 1892
- NRHP reference No.: 03000204
- Added to NRHP: April 11, 2003

St. Albans General Store, also known as Head's Store, is a historic commercial building located at St. Albans, Franklin County, Missouri. It was built in 1892, and is a two-story frame building with a large one-story ell. It features a one-story, wrap-around porch. The main block has a steeply pitched truncated hip roof. Also on the property is a contributing blacksmith shop constructed in the 1920s. It is a significant example of a rural general store and residence.

It was listed on the National Register of Historic Places in 2003.

== Origins ==
The store was built by a group of 10 area residents. Each resident contributed 60 dollars to finance the store. The details of the agreement were documented in the "Day Book of the St. Albans Store Building" which was kept by Charles Becker, the first director and treasurer for the store company
