= St. Albans Farms Stone Barn =

- U.S. National Register of Historic Places
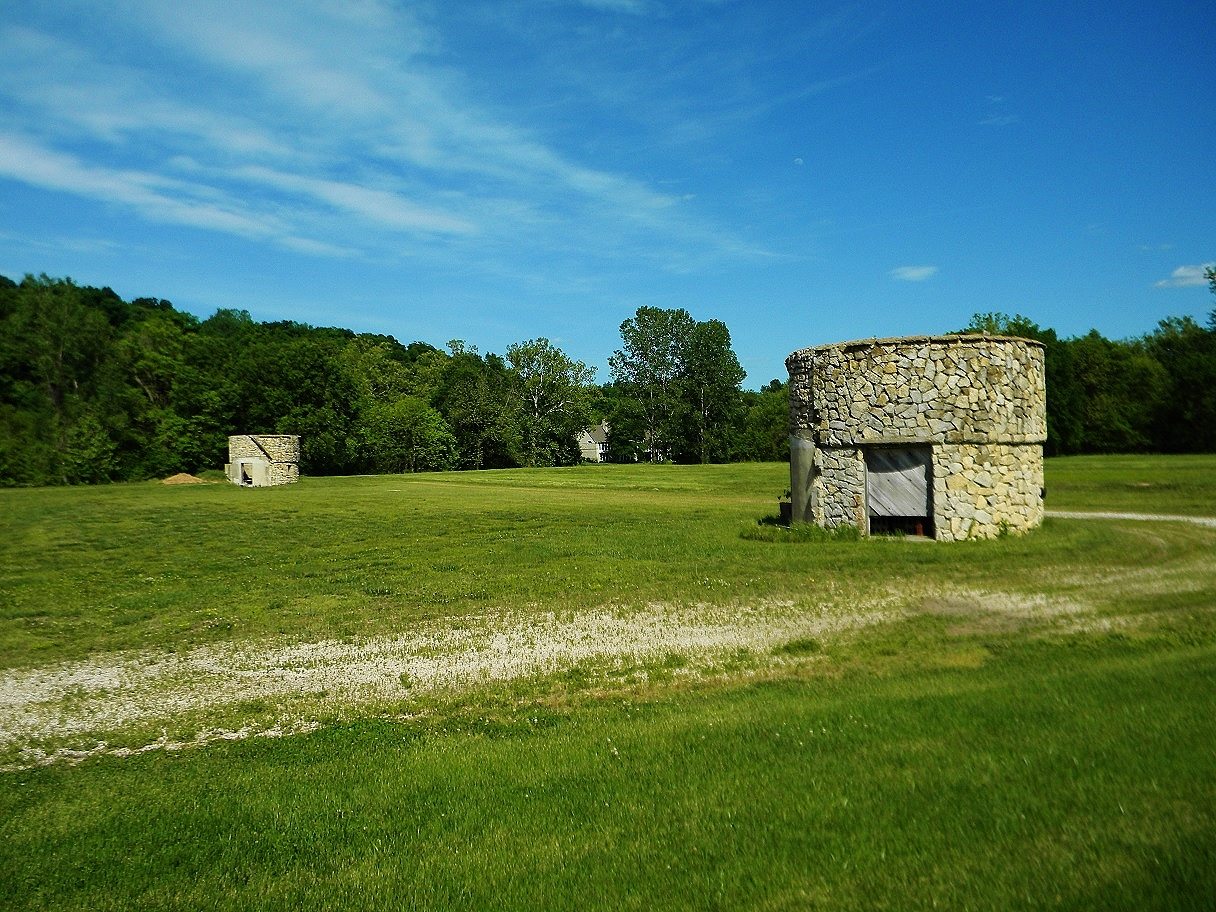
- St. Albans Farms Stone Barn remains, May 2016

- Location within Missouri Location within the United States
- Location: 3476 St. Albans Rd., St. Albans, Missouri
- Coordinates: 38°35′0″N 90°45′27″W
- Area: less than one acre
- Built: c. 1918
- Architect: Link, Theodore C.
- Architectural style: Barn
- NRHP reference No.: 05001550
- Added to NRHP: January 26, 2006

St. Albans Farms Stone Barn, also known as the Stone Dairy Barn, is a historic barn located at St. Albans, Franklin County, Missouri. It was built about 1918, and is a large U-shaped one-story frame building with limestone-faced walls and a steep gable roof. It features round corner towers that are topped with conical roofs. Associated with the barn are a large round tile silo off of each back corner. Much of the barn has been demolished.

It was listed on the National Register of Historic Places in 2006.
