= The Fulton School =

Montessori school in Chesterfield, Missouri, United States

Location
- 1100 White Road; Chesterfield, Missouri 63017; United States; 38°39′17.51″N 90°31′21.83″W

Information
- Type: Private school
- Motto: Joy, Curiosity, Independence
- Founded: 1962; 64 years ago
- Founder: Barbara Fulton
- Head of school: Kara Fulton Douglass
- Teaching staff: 16.8 (on an FTE basis)
- Grades: Toddler–12
- Enrollment: approx. 115
- Education system: Montessori
- Campus size: 9 acres (0.036 km^{2})
- Nickname: Eagles (Upper School); Owls (Lower School)
- Accreditation: ISACS
- Website: fulton-school.org

The Fulton School is a Montessori school in Chesterfield, Missouri. It formed in 2022 as a result of a merger between Chesterfield Day School and The Fulton School at St. Albans, but the two institutions had a shared history dating back to 1962.

== History ==
In 1994, Chesterfield Day School–St. Albans was opened in St. Albans. A program for 7th graders began there in 1998. The first upper school senior class graduated in 2004, and in 2007 grades 9–12 officially became St. Albans High School. By 2008, toddlers through grade 8 merged with St. Albans High School, creating The Fulton School at St. Albans, named in honor of Barb Fulton, the long-term head of Chesterfield Day School.

In 1999, a new $4.8 million campus was constructed.

By 2006, the combined enrollment at the two locations was 425. The Chesterfield location served toddlers through sixth grade, and the St. Albans location taught toddlers through 12th grade.

Chesterfield Day School and The Fulton School at St. Albans announced a merger in October 2021. The schools were to be combined as The Fulton School at the Chesterfield location on July 1, 2022. The campus at St. Albans was to be sold.

== Athletics ==
The sports teams of the Upper School compete as the Eagles, while the Lower School took the name Owls, which was used by Chesterfield Day School. All students in grades 9–12 are required to play at least one varsity sport per year.
