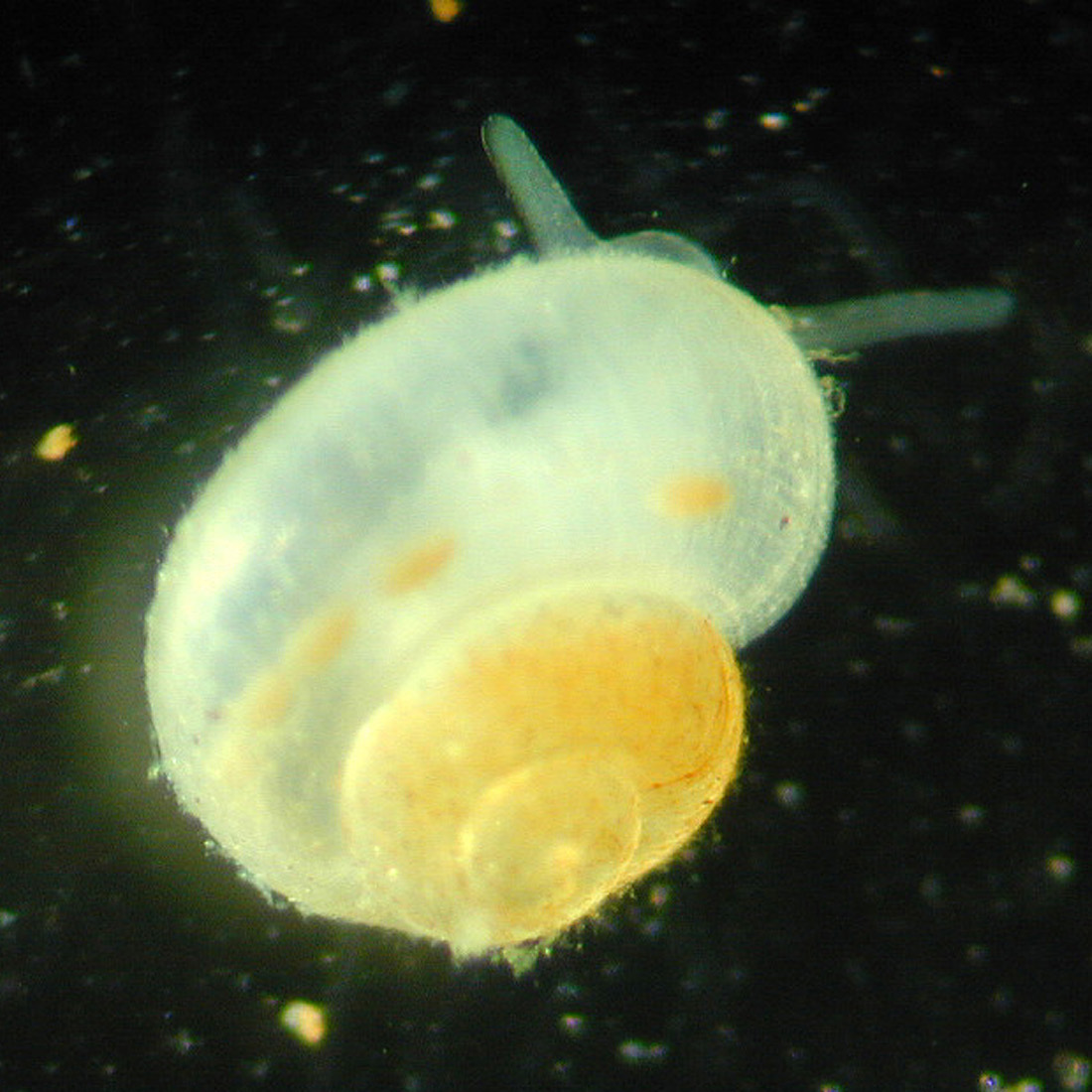
- A live individual of Antrobia culveri

Conservation status
- Endangered (IUCN 2.3)

- Critically Imperiled (NatureServe)

Scientific classification
- Kingdom: Animalia
- Phylum: Mollusca
- Class: Gastropoda
- Subclass: Caenogastropoda
- Order: Littorinimorpha
- Family: Cochliopidae
- Subfamily: Cochliopinae
- Genus: Antrobia; Hubricht, 1971
- Species: A. culveri

Binomial name
- Antrobia culveri Hubricht, 1971

= Tumbling Creek cavesnail =

Species of gastropod

The Tumbling Creek cavesnail (Antrobia culveri) is a species of freshwater cave snail with gills and an operculum, an aquatic gastropod mollusk in the family Amnicolidae.

Antrobia culveri is the only species in the genus Antrobia. This is an endangered species.

The common name refers to Tumbling Creek Cave, a National Natural Landmark, in Taney County, Missouri, USA.

== Taxonomy ==
The Tumbling Creek cavesnail was described as a new species by Leslie Hubricht in 1971, from specimens taken by David Culver, Thomas Aley, and Hubricht in 1969 and 1970. Antrobia culveri is the type species for the genus Antrobia, also described as new to science in 1971 by Hubricht.

Hershler and Hubricht (1988) examined specimens of Antrobia culveri and confirmed the taxonomic placement of this species at that time in the subfamily Littoridininae. They also noted the similarity of the genus Antrobia to, but distinguished it from, the genus Fontigens, which contains cave-adapted snails found in other caves and springs of the Ozark Plateau in Missouri and Arkansas.

== Description ==
The Tumbling Creek cavesnail is a small, white, blind, aquatic snail.

The shell is small, conical, well-rounded and pale-yellow with about 3.5 whorls. The dimensions of the type specimen are as follows: height 2.3 millimeters (mm) (0.09 inches); diameter 2.0 mm (0.08 in); aperture height 1.2 mm (0.05 in); aperture diameter 1.1 mm (0.04 in).

== Distribution ==
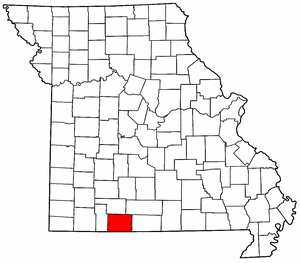
Map of Missouri with Taney County marked in red, where Antrobia culveri occurs.

Antrobia culveri is an endemic species, part of the wildlife of Missouri, United States.

Its distribution is restricted to a single cave stream in Tumbling Creek Cave, in Taney County, in southwestern Missouri.

== Ecology ==
=== Habitat ===
This snail is an animal which lives in caves, thus it is a troglobite. In addition it is an aquatic troglobite, and animals who live in this specialized kind of habitat are known as stygobites or stygofauna.

The Tumbling Creek cavesnail lives on the underside of rocks in areas of Tumbling Creek that have little or no silt. Antrobia culveri is using a solid rock bottom, and the species is usually observed on the undersurface of rocks and gravel of various sizes.

Observations between March and August 2001 suggest that Antrobia culveri is now restricted to 23 m of available stream habitat or approximately 5 percent of the 457 meters of accessible suitable habitat.

Species such as the Tumbling Creek cavesnail, which spend all of their life cycle in subterranean waters, are highly vulnerable to changes in the quality and quantity of that water.

=== Feeding habits ===
Although little is known regarding the biology of this cave snail, it is believed that the species feeds on aquatic microfauna (i.e., the microscopic, bacterial film or "biofilm" which does appear to be ingested by the cave snail). Because Tumbling Creek cavesnails are usually concentrated in those sections of Tumbling Creek Cave which are adjacent to large deposits of bat guano, it has been suggested that Antrobia culveri is indirectly dependent upon these deposits for food.

=== Life cycle ===
Life history aspects of this species, including its reproductive behavior, are unknown.

== Conservation ==
The number of cave snails has significantly decreased over the past few decades, from an estimated 15,118 in 1973, to the point where only one individual was found within the survey areas during January 11, 2001 and April 22, 2003. A small population containing approximately 40 individuals does exist however in a small area upstream from the part of the creek that is regularly surveyed. Based on the decline of the Tumbling Creek cavesnail, it is listed as endangered at United States Fish and Wildlife Service list of endangered species since August 14, 2002.

Although the primary limiting factor of the population appears to be decreased water quality, due to increased erosion and water pollution in the cave's recharge area, scientific research is needed to confirm this hypothesis.

== See also ==
- Antrobia breweri is a synonym (orth. error at 2010 IUCN Red List) of Antrorbis breweri cf.
