= Ozark Caverns =

Cave in Missouri, United States

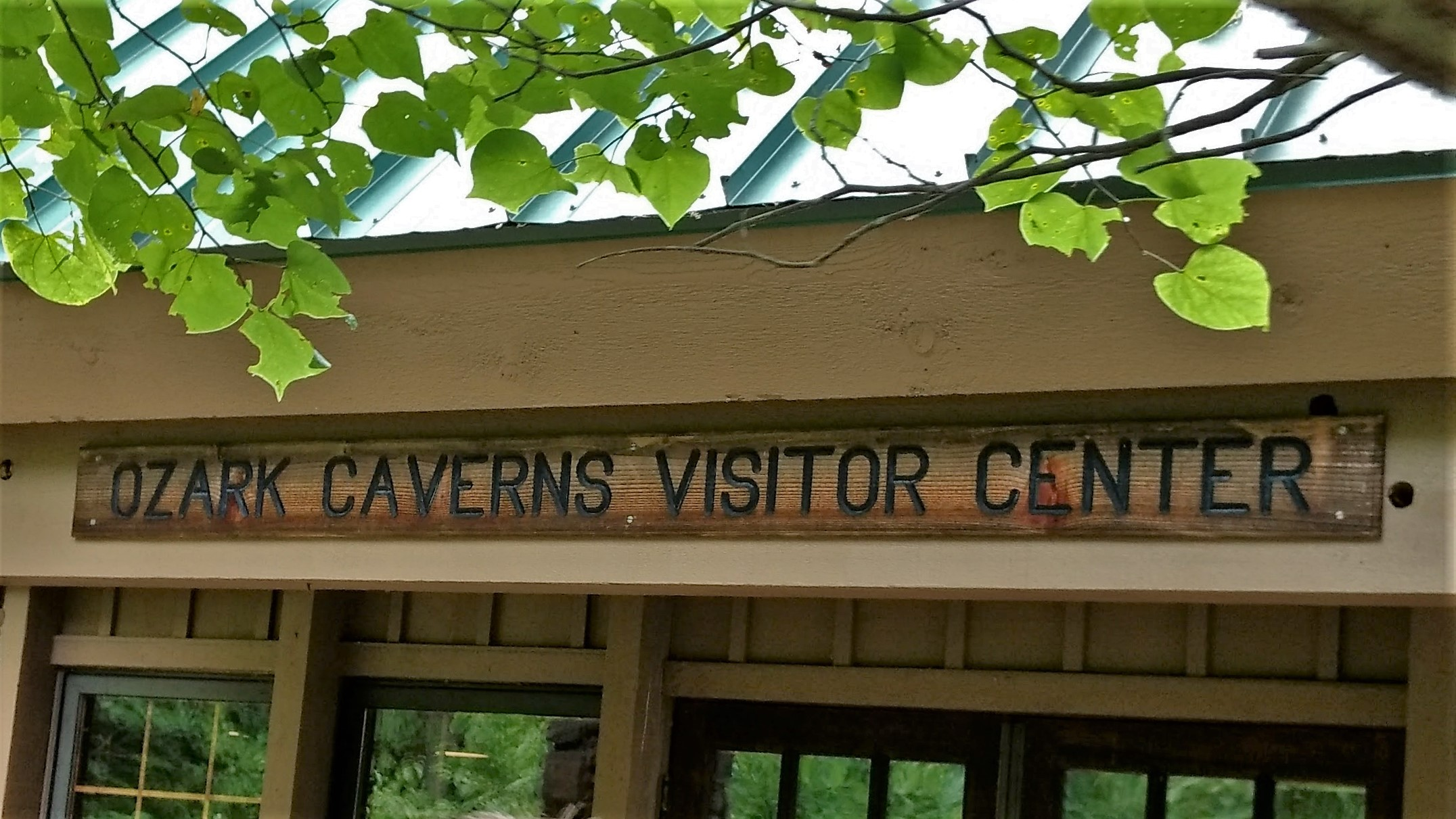
- Visitor Center
- Interactive map of Ozark Caverns
- Coordinates: 38°03′17″N 92°35′01″W
- Length: 1 mi (1.6 km)
- Entrances: 1
- Difficulty: Easy
- Access: Public
- Show cave length: 0.5 mi (0.80 km)
- Lighting: None
- Features: Angel Showers

Ozark Caverns is an unlit cave located within the south side of Lake of the Ozarks State Park. It is part of a large group of "wild" caves in Missouri. Ozark Caverns is one of three "tamed" caves that is accessible to tourists (the other two being Bridal Cave and Jacob's Cave). It is part of the Osage River Cave region. The cave is walk-through and wheelchair accessible.

== History ==
The cave was first explored in the late 1880s. Commercial development of the cave began in the 1930s with the creation of Lake of the Ozarks by President Truman. The developers added concrete walking paths, wooden bridges and lighting. Ozarks Caverns was commercially owned until it was bought by the Missouri state park system in 1979. After the state purchased the cave, the cave's lighting system was removed. The bat population was eliminated due to white-nose syndrome.

== Formation ==
A stream flows through much of the cave and flows out the cave opening. Ozark Caverns is famous for the unusual "shower-head and bathtub" formation called Angel Showers which appears as multiple streams of water coming from the cavern ceiling and landing in a calcite "tub" formation. Only fourteen of these formations are known to exist. There are preserved claw marks in one of the cave walls.

== Tours ==
The cave is open to the public and tours are held daily. It is closed from September - May. Because the lighting has been removed, small, handheld lanterns provide light for the 0.5 mile round-trip tour. Due to white-nose syndrome, all personal belongings must be placed in bags or left behind.
