= St. Albans, Missouri =

Unincorporated community in Missouri, U.S.

Coordinates: 38°34′45″N 90°46′30″W

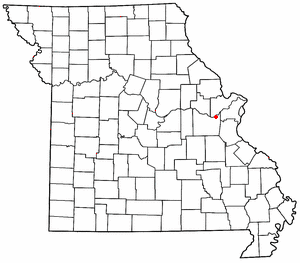

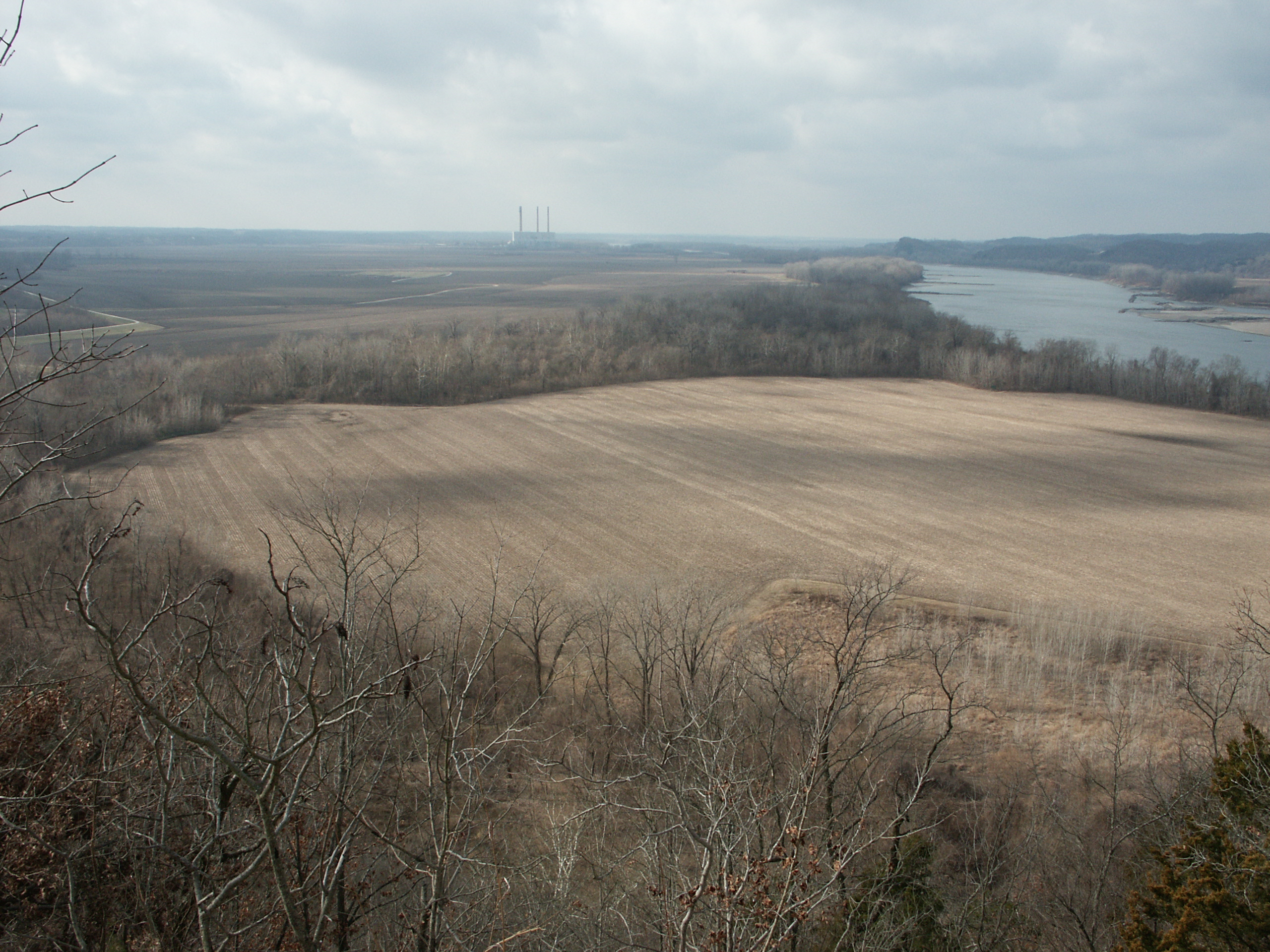
A view of the Missouri River and Saint Albans Island

St. Albans is an unincorporated community in northeastern Franklin County, Missouri, United States. It lies approximately five miles northeast of Labadie and about seven miles west of Wildwood. St. Albans is above the Missouri River floodplain. The town borders a small section of St. Charles County which, unlike the rest of the county, lies on the south side of the Missouri River.

St. Albans was founded in 1837. It was named after St Albans, England.

The St. Albans General Store and St. Albans Farms Stone Barn are on the National Register of Historic Places, as is Tavern Cave. The Lewis and Clark Expedition visited that cave and Meriwether Lewis nearly lost his life when slipping down the bluffs here. The expedition journals mention a whirlpool in the river, the Devil's Raceground, which is now dry land, due to a change in the course of the river: it is the portion of St. Charles County anomalously on the south side of the river.

St. Albans was home to The Fulton School at St. Albans, an independent, not-for-profit, private Montessori school serving students from 18 months of age through 12th grade.
