= Cupola Pond =

Protected area in Missouri, US

- IUCN category III (natural monument or feature)
- Location within Missouri Location within the United States
- Location: Ripley County
- Coordinates: 36.7991°N 91.0898°W
- Area: 160.6 acres (65.0 ha)
- Established: 1975
- Governing body: Missouri Department of Natural Resources
- Website: Cupola Pond

U.S. National Natural Landmark
- Designated: 1975

Cupola Pond is a karstland sinkhole location within Ripley County in the U.S. state of Missouri. The site is a National Natural Landmark. Located within Mark Twain National Forest, the pond site and sinkhole are protected by the United States Forest Service.

The pond is noted by biologists for its population of water tupelo trees. This species is usually found in the Mississippi Delta and other regions of the U.S. Deep South, and this Ozarks population is a disjunct. The unusual biome may be related to the relative age of the sinkhole, which has been pollen-dated to yield an estimated age of at least 20,000 years before present. This makes the formation relatively long-lived for a sinkhole.

Surrounding the sinkhole and pond is an oak–hickory forest. The forest contains pin oak, white oak, northern red oak, and hickory trees. The sinkole pond is noted for its rich population of amphibians.
