= Bluff Dweller's Cave =

Cave in the United States of America

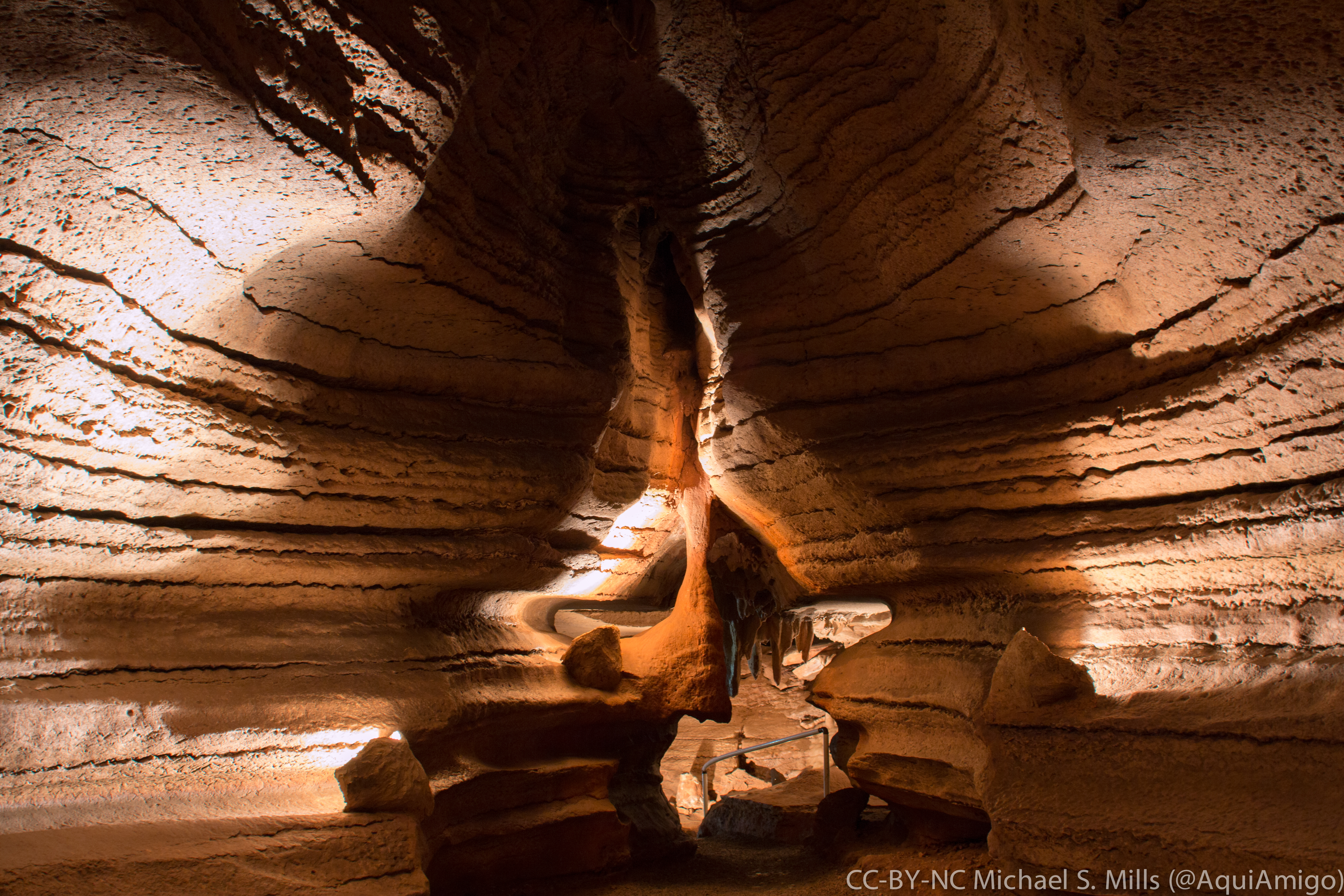
- Passage in Bluff Dweller's Cave

- Location within Missouri
- Location: McDonald County, Missouri, United States
- Coordinates: 36°31′08″N 94°29′13″W
- Length: 3,268 feet (996 m)
- Discovery: 1925
- Geology: Karst cave, Pierson Limestone/Saint Joe Limestone
- Entrances: 2
- Access: Open Winter Nov-Feb 10 am to 5 pm Spring/summer/fall Mar-Oct 10 am to 6 pm Closed Thanksgiving, Christmas Day & New Years Day
- Features: One hour long guided tour; Browning Museum; Gemstone panning; Gift shop
- Website: Official website

Bluff Dweller's Cave is a show cave located just south of Noel, Missouri that was discovered in 1925 and opened to the public in 1927. The cave was formed in the Pierson Limestone during the Paleozoic Era. The cave's passages total over 4,000 ft in length, with two entrances beneath a limestone outcropping of the bluff.

== Description ==
Bluff Dwellers Cave was formed in Mississippian age fossiliferous limestone. The Ozark Uplift raised the solid bed of limestone up above sea level where rainwater slowly seeped through cracks, dissolving away the water-soluble rock. Over time these cracks were enlarged enough that groundwater flowed through, creating the long passageways. The Ozark Uplift also lifted the rock and cave within, above the water table, allowing passageways to drain. Speleothems began to form as rainwater continued to dissolve the limestone over the cave and redeposit once it reached the open cave. The cave was accessed by prehistoric natives as a means of periodic shelter but, before recorded history, was finally sealed off by a collapse at the entrance.

The cave has many speleothems including stalactites, stalagmites, cave coral, draperies, flowstone, and rimstone. A crystal lake, created by a rimstone dam, which is 2.5 cm thick, 30 cm high and 22.8 meters long, is one of the largest in the state. Admission to the cave includes access to the Browning Museum where one can view arrowheads collected from the local area, as well as rocks, minerals, and fossils collected from around the country. The museum also displays antiques from the Browning family.

== History ==
The cave was found in 1925 by C. Arthur Browning while checking traps on land he had lived on his entire life. Browning found a small hole, about 1 foot in diameter, where cold air could be felt blowing out. He sought help to excavate the loose rocks and dirt so they could further explore the cave. During excavation, substantial artifacts were discovered, including arrowheads, grinding stones, tools made of bone and skeletal remains of the early Native American inhabitants dating back to as early as 5000 B.C. Public tours began in 1927, and after over 99 years, the cave is still owned and operated by the Browning family, today the 3rd generation.
