= Pickle Springs =

Protected area in Missouri, US

Pickle Springs Natural Area
- IUCN category V (protected landscape/seascape)
- Location within Missouri Location within the United States
- Location: Ste. Genevieve County
- Nearest city: Farmington, Missouri
- Coordinates: 37.801147°N 90.301208°W
- Area: 256.5 acres (103.8 ha)
- Established: 1986
- Governing body: Missouri Department of Natural Resources
- Website: Pickle Springs

U.S. National Natural Landmark
- Designated: June 13, 1986

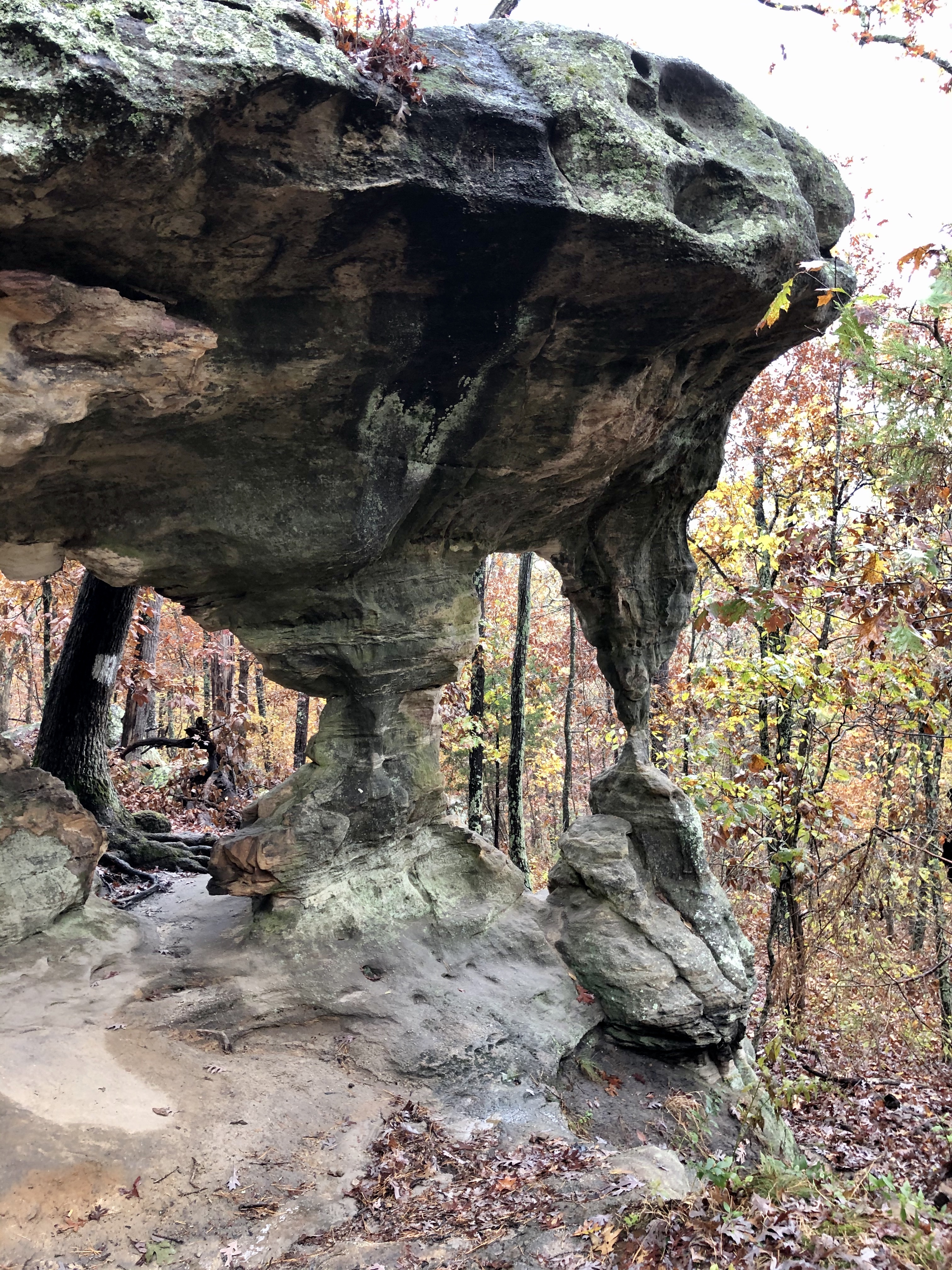
Rock formations Pickle Springs Natural Area

Pickle Springs Natural Area is a 256.5-acre park location within Ste. Genevieve County in the U.S. state of Missouri. The site, a National Natural Landmark, is protected by the Missouri Department of Conservation. The natural area, a place of steep-sided rocky slopes, is characterized by small box canyons, sometimes called “shut-ins” because direct sunlight is shut out of them. Small, seasonal waterfalls trickle down the sides of the box canyons, providing nourishment for relict species that are otherwise rare in southern Missouri. Ferns and amphibians live here that are much more characteristic of the North American North Woods hundreds of miles away. Pickle Springs is located close to, although separate from, Hawn State Park. The nearest settlement is Farmington, Missouri. Access to the Natural Area requires hiking a 2-mile-long trail
