= Simms Creek =

Stream in the American state of Missouri

Coordinates: 38.000309°N 93.882993°W

Simms Creek is a stream in St. Clair County in the U.S. state of Missouri. It is a tributary of the Osage River.

A variant name was "Sims Creek". The stream bears the name of a pioneer citizen.
