= Devils Well =

Sinkhole cave in Missouri, United States

- Interactive map of Devils Well
- Location: Devil's Well Rd, Salem, MO 65560
- Coordinates: 37°37′7.5″N 92°9′16″W
- Website: https://www.nps.gov/ozar/planyourvisit/devils-well.htm

Devils Well is a sinkhole cave near Akers in the U.S. state of Missouri, containing an underground lake that is the largest in the state. It is a part of the Ozark National Scenic Riverways and can be viewed by the public any day during daylight hours. The U.S. Park Service has set up a metal staircase and a switch-activated light; however, it is recommended that visitors bring additional light sources.

== History ==
In 1954 the Devils Well was explored by the brothers Bill and Bob Wallace, using a bosun's chair attached by a steel cable to a hand winch. The distance from the entrance to the surface of the lake is a vertical drop of approximately 100 feet. The brothers measured the chamber containing the lake and found it to be 400 feet long and 100 feet wide. The cave also features several waterfalls of various heights.

In 1956 the geologist Jerry Vineyard entered the cave and observed two species of blind cave fish and a sculpin fish.

The cave was entered on June 24 and 25, 2015, by five members of the Cave Research Foundation. The goal of this exploration was threefold: to ensure the stability of the current metal viewing platform, to assess the state of the lake and cave life, and to demonstrate that current equipment and methods would allow for the cave to be more thoroughly explored. As a result of this expedition, it was learned that waterproof two-way radios did not function well. In addition, two species of cave crayfish were identified: the southern cave crayfish (Orconectes australis) and the Salem cave crayfish (Cambarus hubrichti).

== Geology ==
Devils Well is a part of the water-supply system that feeds Cave Spring on the Current River. It was formed when water eroded underground dolomite strata.

== Location ==
Devils Well is located on the Cave Spring Trail approximately seven miles southeast of Akers. L-A-D Foundation/Pioneer Forest owns most of the land that the 4.6-mile-round-trip (7.4 km) trail passes through. It is a low-lying riparian zone that has shallow soils, rocky ridges, and deep swales. Trail construction was begun in 1994 by volunteers, supported by a Recreational Trails Grant by the Missouri Department of Natural Resources. The complete loop trail was finished in 2007.
