= Tavern Cave =

Cave in Missouri, U.S.

- U.S. National Register of Historic Places
- Location within Missouri Location within the United States
- Nearest city: St. Albans, Missouri
- Coordinates: 38°36′10″N 90°45′26″W
- Area: 9.9 acres (4.0 ha)
- NRHP reference No.: 70000331
- Added to NRHP: June 15, 1970

Tavern Cave, also known as the Taverne-A Cave, is a historic archaeological site located near St. Albans, Franklin County, Missouri. Meriwether Lewis and William Clark visited Tavern Cave on May 23, 1804, at the beginning of the Lewis and Clark Expedition. The cave includes a petroglyph of either a canoe or a historic flat boat and several 19th-century inscriptions.

It was listed on the National Register of Historic Places in 1970.
