= Riverbluff Cave =

Cave in Missouri, U.S.

Coordinates: 37°06′23″N 93°19′45″W

The Riverbluff Cave is a paleontological site discovered in the United States, near Springfield, Missouri. The entrance is filled with stalactites, stalagmites and columns. The cave is approximately 830,000 years old (making it the oldest known fossil cave site in the US) and 2,000 ft (610 m) long, featuring Pleistocene fossils, notably of the short-faced bear (Arctodus simus) the largest bear species on the Earth (around 5–6 feet tall at the shoulder and weighing in the area of 2,000 lb (910 kg)).

The cave is located in the widespread karst landscape of the Springfield Plateau of the western Missouri Ozarks and developed within the soluble Mississippian limestones of the region. It was unveiled accidentally on September 11, 2001, when engineers were blasting for a new road.

The cave is not open to the public, but has virtual tours on YouTube.

Approximately 50 ft (15 m) from the cave is a museum which holds multiple rocks and fossils.
