= Onondaga Cave State Park =

State park in Missouri, United States

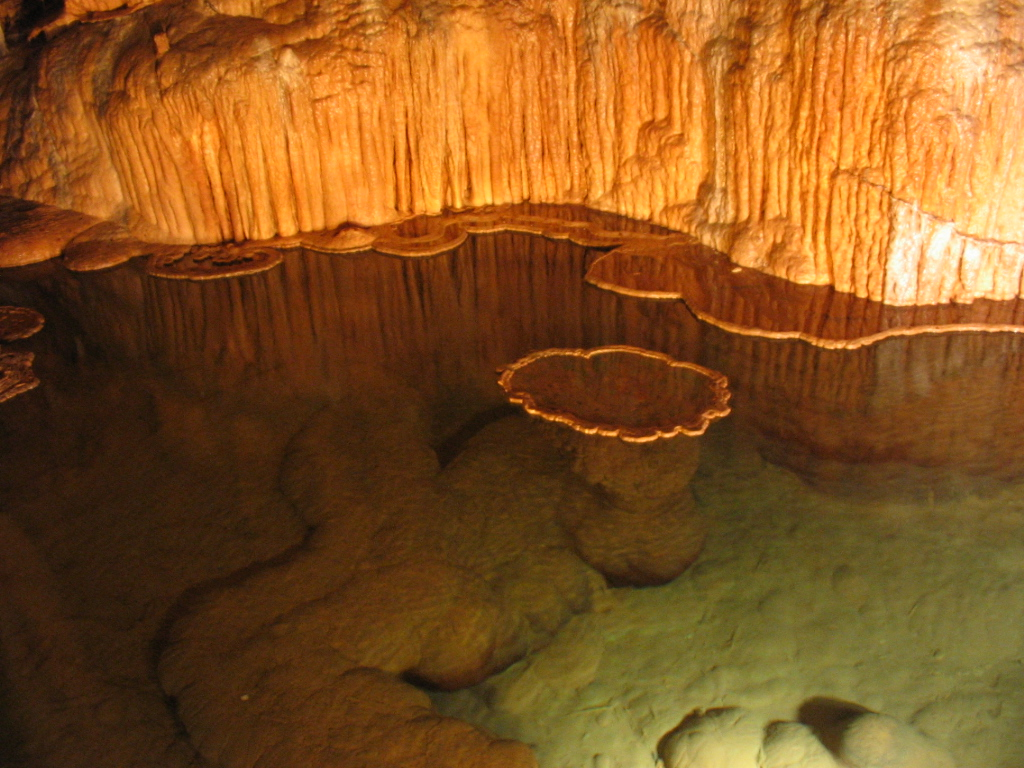
- "Lily pad" formation in Onondaga Cave

- Location within Missouri Location within the United States
- Location: Crawford County, Missouri, United States
- Coordinates: 38°03′35″N 91°13′41″W
- Area: 1,357.7 acres (549.4 ha)
- Elevation: 640 ft (200 m)
- Established: 1982
- Administrator: Missouri Department of Natural Resources
- Visitors: 421,225 (in 2023)
- Website: Official website

U.S. National Natural Landmark
- Designated: 1980

Onondaga Cave State Park is a Missouri state park located on the Meramec River approximately 5 miles (8.0 km) southeast of the village of Leasburg. The park was established in 1982. Park activities include cave tours, camping, fishing, hiking, picnicking, and swimming.

== History ==
In 1850, the area was settled by George and Statirah Cresswell, who moved to the region from Washington County, Missouri with Statirah's adopted family, the Allisons. The family built a mill on the Meramec River near Saranac Springs. When a large flood destroyed Cresswell's mill in 1881, the property was purchased by William Henry Rollision Davis. A new mill was built on the property further away from the river at Davis Spring (now Onondaga Spring).

In 1886, while studying the outlet of the spring that powered the new mill, a local resident by the name of Charles Christopher discovered that a cave existed behind the spring. With a borrowed boat and two of his friends (John Eaton and Mitis Horine), Christopher entered the cavern and spent an entire day exploring the tunnels within the property. Inspired by their adventure, Christopher and Eaton acquired the land over the cave and began developing their discovery as the "Mammoth Cave of Missouri", spawning a property dispute with Davis that lasted more than fifty years.

At the time, "cave onyx" was in demand for architecture, and many caves in the area were being harvested for this purpose. Funds for the development of the cave was something neither Christopher or Eaton could spare. Unable to decide whether to continue the cave as a mine or as a tourist destination, the pair had the cave surveyed in 1897 for mining but also gave tours to make the money needed to develop the caverns further. Arthur Hitch, one of the first tourists in the cave system, released a publication about the cave using Eaton's own flash-powder photographs.

In 1899, Davis died and his property was sold (against the wishes of his widow, Artressia Davis) to a St. Louis group owned by George Bothe, Sr. In 1902, over 15 years after their discovery, Eaton gave up on the cavern and sold his holdings to the Indian Creek Land Company in the care of Eugene Hunt Benoist. Upset about this turn of events, Christopher in turn sold his portion of the holdings to the Bothe group.

Bothe and Philip Franck formed a company with the intention of mining the cavern, and some test mining was performed. The cavern's difficult access and a drop in interest in cave onyx made this venture a fruitless endeavor. The cave was opened as a tourist attraction for the upcoming Louisiana Purchase Exposition planned in St. Louis for 1904.

The name for the cavern system was chosen in 1904 by Myrtle Land, and was named for an Iroquois tribe. The translation of Onondaga is "People of the Mountain."

In 1910, the property owned by Bothe was sold to his niece, Catharine Weinborg, who in turn leased the property to Bob Bradford in 1913. Bradford eventually bought the cave property from Weinborg, but property disputes with Artressia Davis continued. In 1930, this dispute became a three-way struggle over the land when William Mook (who leased the Indian Creek Land Company property from Benoist in 1913) discovered that about half of Onondaga Cave was under his land.

This discovery came from Ed Houser and Edward Myers, and with the help of Robert Lee Mook (Mook's brother), a tunnel was dug into Onondaga Cave and a fence was erected where the supposed property line existed. Their half of the cave became known as Missouri Caverns, with Robert Lee Mook as the manager. Another problem for Onondaga came from the commercial opening of the nearby Cathedral Cave (owned by Timmerman Nielson and managed by Al Keber).

In 1932, Missouri Caverns was opened as the first electrically lit cave in the Missouri Ozarks region. Though the entrance is now sealed, the ruins of the buildings over the entrance still exist not far from the current visitor parking area. Onondaga now had competition on two fronts from both Cathedral Cave and from the back portion of itself under the name Missouri Caverns. The court battles continued over the land disputes, and Onondaga suffered due to its more distant position from US 66 on State Road H, as compared to the closer Missouri Caverns.

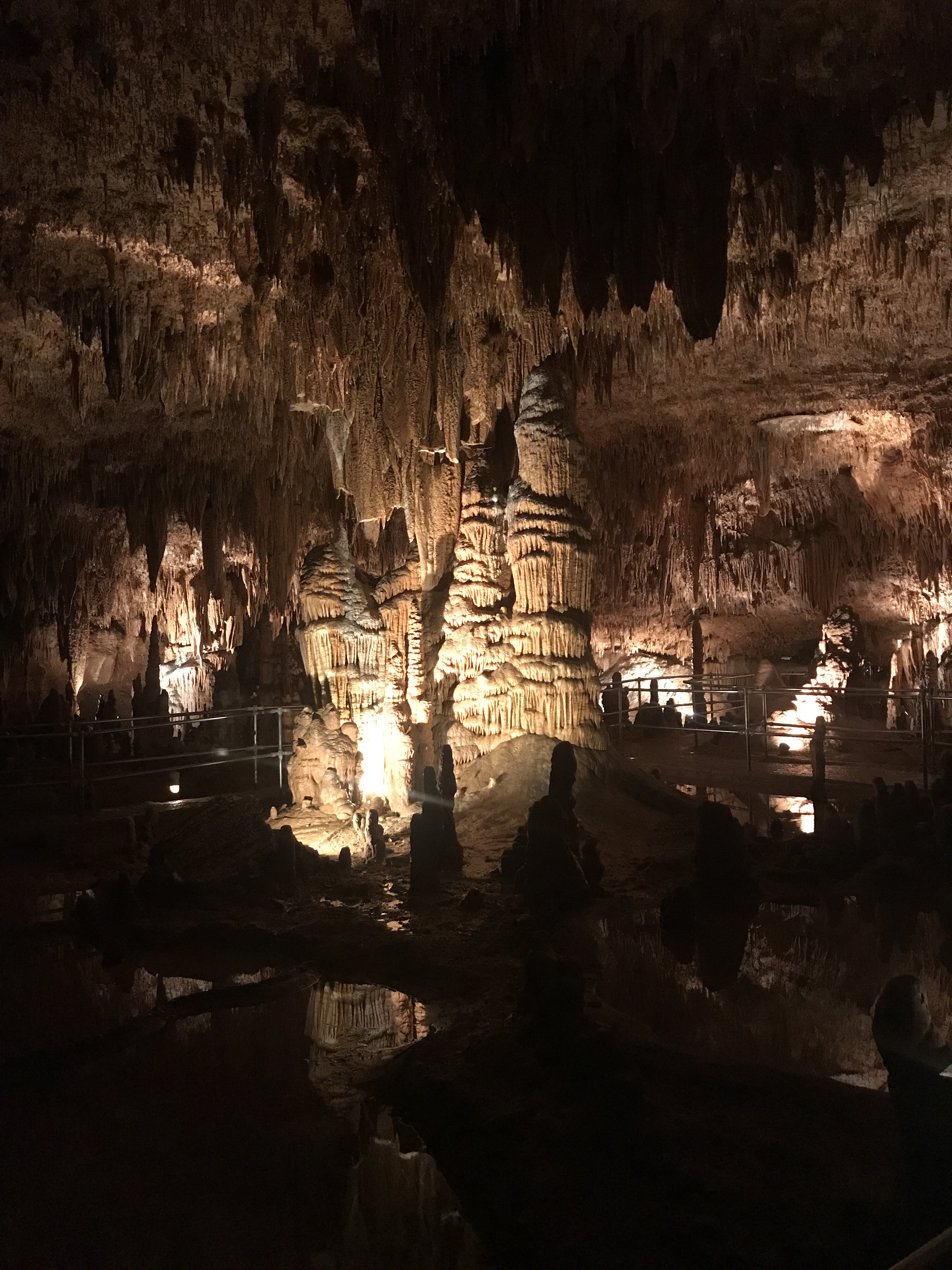
A column formation known as the "Rock of Ages"

A situation occurred that mirrored the land disputes in 1934 when senatorial candidate Harry S. Truman and members of his Democratic party had a planned visit to Missouri Caverns. The Republican Party members had arrived for a tour of Onondaga Cave, and the two parties met at the fence separating the caves. There, beneath the heavily disputed properties, the two parties engaged in a political debate through the fence.

In November 1934, William Mook died. Six months later, in May 1935, the Missouri Supreme Court ruled in favor of the Mooks and the Indian Creek Land Company. Bradford was not deterred by this turn of events, however, and continued to push for Onondaga's success. In 1937 (now in his seventies), Bradford built a motel at the mouth of the cave, known as the Cool Room, as the building's temperature was regulated by the cavern's consistently cool air.

A new entrance to Onondaga was dug out by Bradford in 1938 (the entrance currently used when entering and exiting the cave). Until this time, tourists entered and left the cavern by boat. Now the tour could be routed so that tourists entered through the original boat entrance and exited by foot through the new entrance. During this same time, Robert Lee Mook was experiencing legal problems. William Mook's other heirs (who ran the Barnard Hospital in St. Louis) owned shares in the estate, and he attempted to sue them after they had loaned money to Bradford for improvements on Onondaga Cave. Missouri Caverns closed not long afterward because of these legal problems as well as decreased interest in tourism during the two World Wars. Cathedral Cave also closed because of the decrease in tourism, and Onondaga's own future was uncertain after the death of Bradford.

Artressia Davis, now 95, died after several unsuccessful attempts to sue the proprietors of both the Missouri Caverns and Onondaga Cave in 1943. In 1945, Bradford's widow, Mary Bradford, sold Onondaga to the Barnard Hospital. For the first time since its discovery, Onondaga now had only one owner. A director of the hospital, Charles Rice, took control of the now-joint caverns as well as Cathedral Cave and, free of the financial and legal problems that had plagued the caves since their discovery, began to further develop them under the management of Al Bryan. The electrification of the rural area of the state allowed the entire cave to be wired for lighting, and the old tour paths were replaced with new trails, stairs, and bridges. These improvements continued after Rice's death in 1949.

In 1953, the property was sold to Lester B. Dill and Lyman Riley. The boat trips were discontinued because of safety concerns, but the docks inside of the cavern were kept and can still be seen today, along with a replica of the boats used for entering the cave. Dill had been in the business of caverns from a young age and had operated both the Fisher and Mushroom caves at Meramec State Park. He had also been responsible for the developing of the Saltpeter Cave into the now heavily commercialized Meramec Caverns. Riley, a retired teacher, had worked at both Meramec Caverns and Onondaga Cave.

This began a time of prosperity for the caverns, with Riley and Dill making appearances on television game shows. Celebrities were invited to visit the caverns, stories were written about the caverns, and an advertising campaign began in all forms of media. Also, in 1954, Riley became an ordained minister and is reputed to have held church services and performed wedding ceremonies in the cave.

Riley sold his shares of the cavern to Dill in 1967 when he retired from the business to pursue his religious interests. Now back to one owner, the 1970s would once again cause Onondaga to be the source of a property dispute.

=== Meramec Basin Project ===
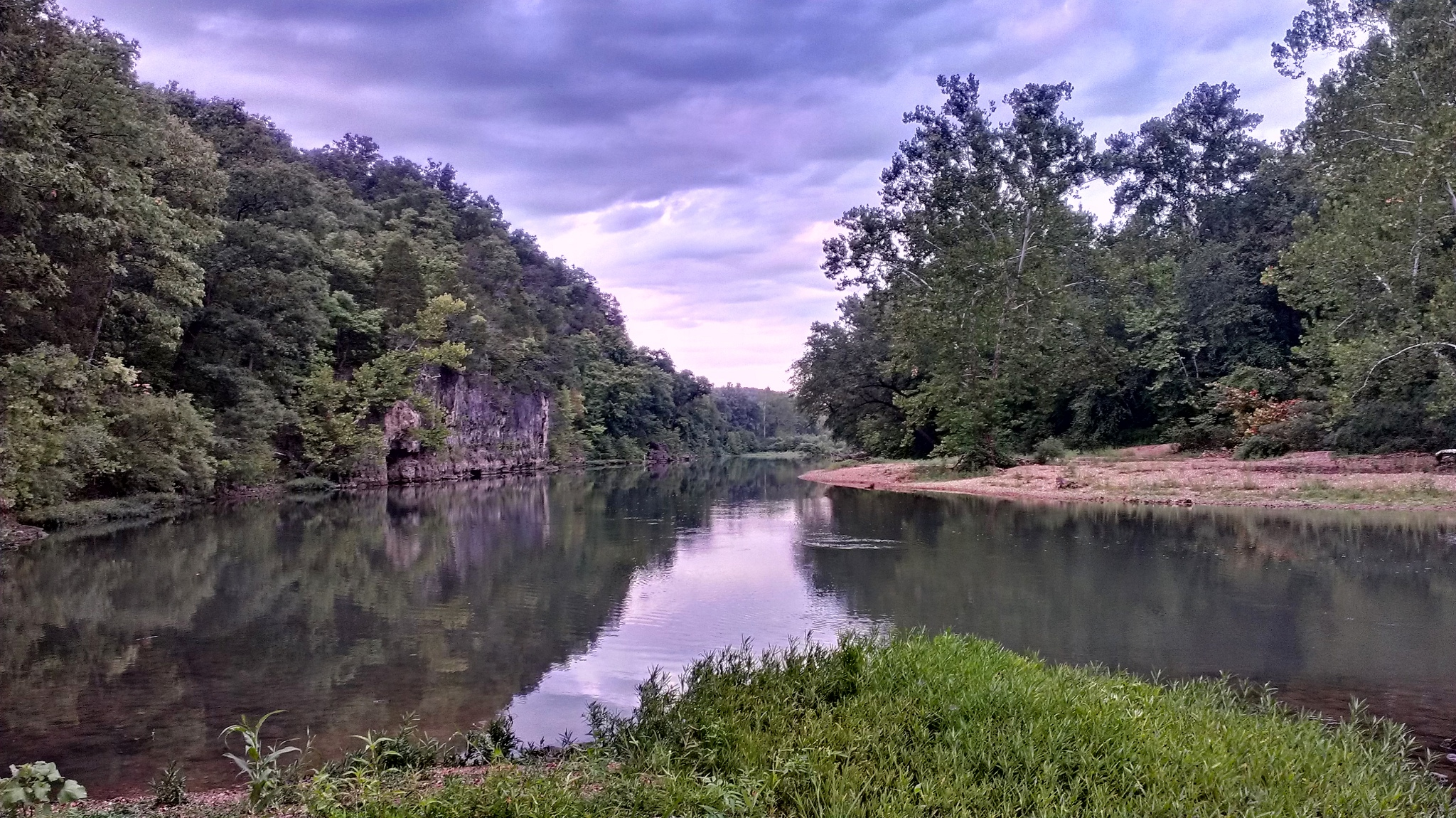
Meramec River at Onondaga Cave State Park

The U.S. Congress had approved the building of a dam near Pacific, Missouri in 1938 to help control the flooding of the Meramec River, which had devastated the lower river basin in 1915 and 1944. The U.S. Army Corps of Engineers proposed relocating the dam upstream at Meramec State Park in 1943. Riley had spoken in favor of the dam in 1949, believing this would bring additional tourism to the area. An iteration of this plan was authorized by Congress in 1967 as the Meramec Park Lake Project, which included the dam at Meramec as well as 30 others along the Meramec, Bourbeuse, and Big rivers.

Would-be extent of Meramec Park Lake

Opposition to the dam began in the 1960s from both local and nearby St. Louis area residents. Local farmland was taken by market price condemnation. Recreationists from the city believed it would have severe impacts on environmental, economic, and engineering concerns, and the value of the Meramec as a free-flowing canoe navigable stream. Construction industry officials, local politicians, and developers saw the prospect of great economic prosperity with a major lake only one hour from St. Louis. Dill was first pro-dam, thinking he would run glass-bottomed boats in the cave, but he joined the opposition when a survey of the cave showed that the dam near Sullivan would back upstream into the cave, and flood 80% of the cave when the lake was at normal pool.

As this controversy raged Dill reopened Cathedral Cave, another cave on the property 1 1/2 times as long as Onondaga, under the name Missouri Caverns. New trails and lights were installed in the cave, and a large column formation within the cave was renamed the Liberty Bell in honor of the 1976 Bicentennial. The cave was closed soon after the defeat of the dam project in 1978. For several years it was subject to vandalism and theft that destroyed the lighting and visitor building.

In 1978 a public referendum on the dam project was held, on August 8, in the 12 eastern Missouri counties affected by the Meramec Park Lake Project, and 64% of the voters opposed the building of the dam. Congressmen who previously supported the dam took note of the vote and voted to deauthorize the project, the only such case in the country where citizens stopped an Army Corps dam already under construction. Ronald Reagan signed the deauthorization bill on December 19, 1981, one and a half years after the death of Dill on August 13, 1980. It was Dill's wish that the state be given the right of first refusal on the sale of the Onondaga property. With cooperation from his survivors and assistance of the Nature Conservancy the state legislature met the Dill family's request, and Onondaga became a state park dedicated to Lester B. Dill. Officially dedicated in 1982, the cave was also designated as National Natural Landmark.

In 1986 a large celebration was held in commemoration of the 100th anniversary of the cave's discovery. Under the management of the Missouri Department of Natural Resources' Division of State Parks, Onondaga Cave is now in its second century and secure from further land disputes and vandalism. A new visitor center and the nature museum were erected in 1990.

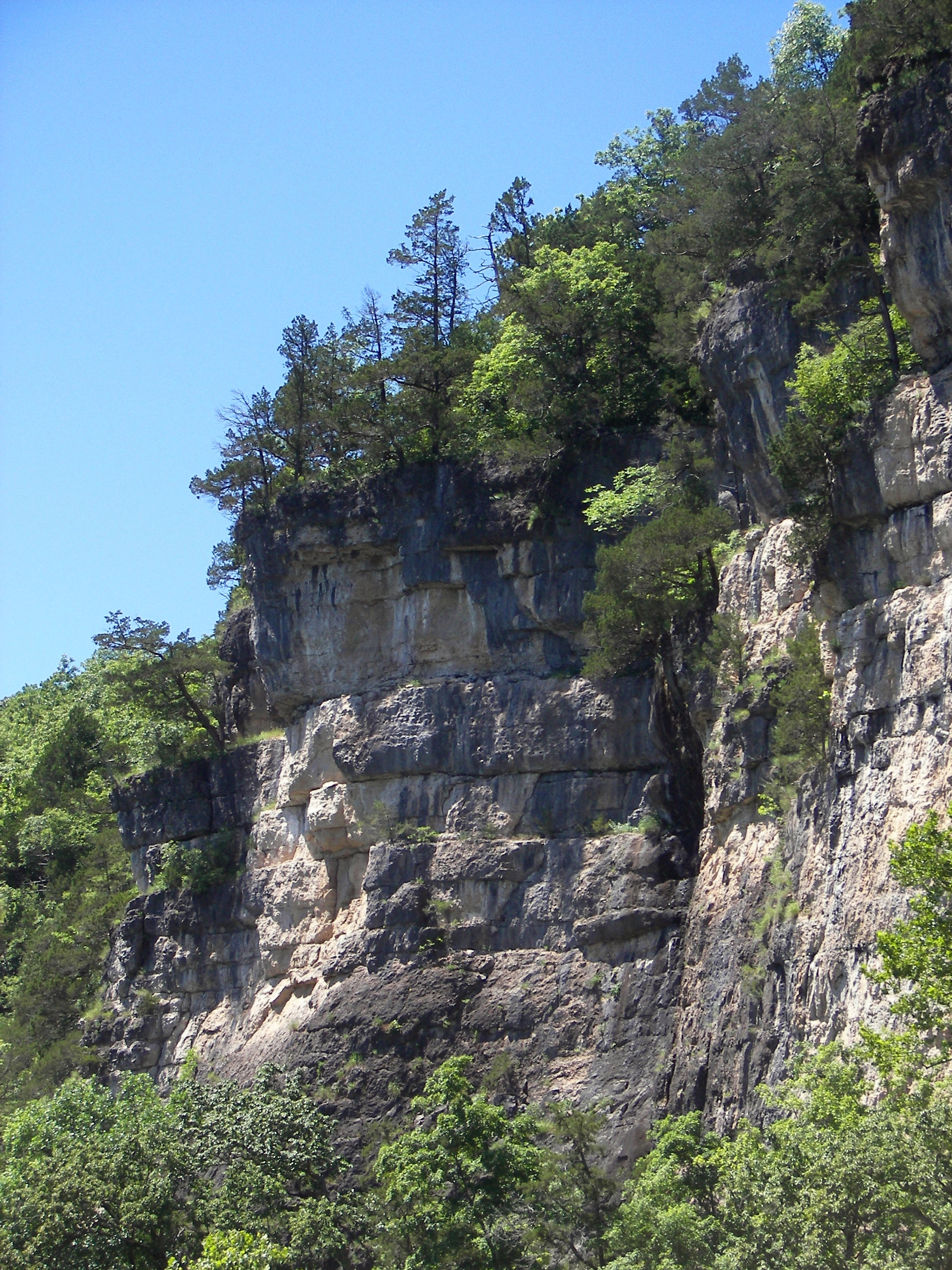
Vilander Bluffs with ancient Juniperus virginiana cedars

== Vilander Bluff Natural Area ==
The Vilander Bluff Natural Area is a unit of the state park that is located at 38°05′56″N 91°08′20″W, 7 miles (11 km) northeast of the main body of the park. Its cliffs harbor unique natural communities, most notably a dry dolomite cliff community with over 200 ancient red cedar trees (Juniperus virginiana) that range in age from 200 to 500 years. The unit straddles the Meramec River, and opposite the bluffs is a rookery containing over 40 nests of the great blue heron.

== See also ==
- List of National Natural Landmarks in Missouri
