= Tucker Prairie =

Protected land in Missouri, U.S.

- IUCN category IV (habitat/species management area)
- Interactive map of Tucker Prairie
- Location: Callaway County, Missouri, USA
- Nearest city: Fulton, Missouri
- Coordinates: 38°57′00″N 91°59′42″W
- Area: 146 acres (59 ha)
- Established: 1999
- Governing body: University of Missouri

U.S. National Natural Landmark
- Designated: 1978

Tucker Prairie is a 146-acre (590,000 m^{2}) tallgrass prairie in the U.S. state of Missouri. Never plowed by farmers, the prairie patch is operated as a National Natural Landmark by the Division of Biological sciences of the University of Missouri, which is headquartered relatively close to the prairie.

== Ecology ==
Although located well within the North American climate zone where prairie grasses and forbs grow, Tucker Prairie is a non-standard prairie patch. It contains hardpan soil types, rich in clay and restricted in its drainage. This means that Tucker Prairie is, at random intervals of time after rainstorms, a wet-footed ecosystem and welcomes plants accordingly. The U.S. National Park Service characterizes Tucker Prairie as "a virgin tall grass prairie occurring within the transition zone between the oak-hickory forest and typical tall grass prairie". The 250-plus native plant species logged at Tucker Prairie include many grasses and forbs that thrive in intermittent-wetland conditions. Grasses reported here include big bluestem, little bluestem, Indian grass, and prairie dropseed.

Owned and unplowed by the William C. Tucker family for 125 years, Tucker Prairie was acquired by the University of Missouri in 1957. It became a National Natural Landmark in 1978. Located on a rural road, it opened to the public in 1999.
