= Wegener Woods =

Listed area in Missouri, US

- IUCN category IV (habitat/species management area)
- Interactive map of Wegener Woods
- Location: Warren County
- Coordinates: 38°39′41″N 91°10′50″W
- Area: 45 acres (18 ha)
- Established: 1975

Wegener Woods is a 45.0-acre natural area located in Warren County in the U.S. state of Missouri. Minimally logged, the natural area is an oak-hickory forest that possesses white oaks of more than 200 years in age, confirmed by dendrochronology. The United States National Park Service states, however, that the woods are in the process of "gradual change to a sugar maple-dominated forest". The transitioning old-growth woodlot is owned by the private sector.
