= Taberville Prairie Conservation Area =

Protected area in Missouri, US

- IUCN category V (protected landscape/seascape)
- Location within Missouri Location within the United States
- Location: St. Clair County, Missouri
- Nearest city: Rockville, Missouri
- Coordinates: 38.0393°N 93.9763°W
- Area: 1,680 acres (6.8 km^{2})
- Established: 1971
- Governing body: Missouri Department of Conservation

The Taberville Prairie Conservation Area is a 1,680-acre (685-hectare) unit, including a 1,360-acre tallgrass prairie which is a natural area located in St. Clair County in the U.S. state of Missouri. The conservation area is characterized by rolling tallgrass prairie, with outcrops of sandstone. The Taberville Prairie, located within the conservation area, is a National Natural Landmark.

The Taberville Prairie Conservation Area is maintained under the jurisdiction of the Missouri Department of Conservation (MDOC). MDOC maintains the property parcels that make up the conservation area for outdoor enjoyments, hiking, shotgun hunting, and deer hunting. The Conservation Area was created by law in 1975, by which time less than one percent of the original prairie land of Missouri remained to be preserved. Endangered species, including species that are critically endangered in Missouri, associated with Taberville Prairie include the greater prairie chicken.
