= Carroll Cave =

Karstland cave in Camden County, Missouri

- Traw Cave
- Discovery: 1954
- Access: Closed to public
- Features: Speleothems, Waterfall
- Website: https://www.mocavesandkarst.org/carroll-cave/

Carroll Cave is a privately owned cave located in Camden County in the U.S. state of Missouri. The cave is not open to the public. It is registered as a National Natural Landmark.

== History ==
Carroll Cave was discovered in 1954. Serious exploration began in 1956, during a period when the cave was open to serious cave explorers (speleologists). The explorers eventually mapped approximately 20 miles of passageways leading to speleothem chambers and a large underground waterfall. After about three decades of exploration, the cave was completely closed to all visitors.

== Description ==
The U.S. National Park Service describes the Carroll Cave system as “a dendritic system of subsurface karst streams and tributaries.” A cave explorer has described wandering through and exploring the complex system of braided passageways implied by this description. The cave was designated as a National Natural Landmark in 1977.
