= Tumbling Creek Cave =

Cave in Missouri, U.S.

- Features: Diverse cave fauna

Tumbling Creek Cave is a privately owned cave located in Taney County in the U.S. state of Missouri. The cave was registered as a National Natural Landmark in 1980.

== Description ==
The U.S. National Park Service describes the Tumbling Creek cave system as containing “the most diverse fauna known for any cave west of the Mississippi River, including a large colony of the endangered gray bat." 112 separate species had been identified within Tumbling Creek cave as of 2005. The cave also offers habitat for the endangered Indiana bat. The National Natural Landmark designation includes 403 acres of surface land, representing access to the privately owned cave surrounded by a protection zone.

Among biologists, this cave may be best known for the Tumbling Creek cavesnail, an aquatic snail that is an endangered species because this cave is the only location where it is known to live. Since 2011, the United States Fish and Wildlife Service has classified the Tumbling Creek Cave as critical habitat for the snail. The cave system is partly contained within the Mark Twain National Forest, which could offer some protection for the endangered species's catchment area. However, the development in the 1990s of a cattle feedlot adjacent to the catchment area generated measured damages to the Tumbling Creek Cave's biodiversity, including a sharp reduction in the population of the endemic cavesnails. The snails require an exposed rock surface and clean water, but their underground watercourse home was filling up with eroded muck from the above-ground feedlot.
