= Bridal Cave =

Cave in Missouri, US

Coordinates: 38.060596°N 92.793102°W

- Interactive map of Bridal Cave
- Location: Camdenton, Missouri
- Length: ~1 mile
- Entrances: 1

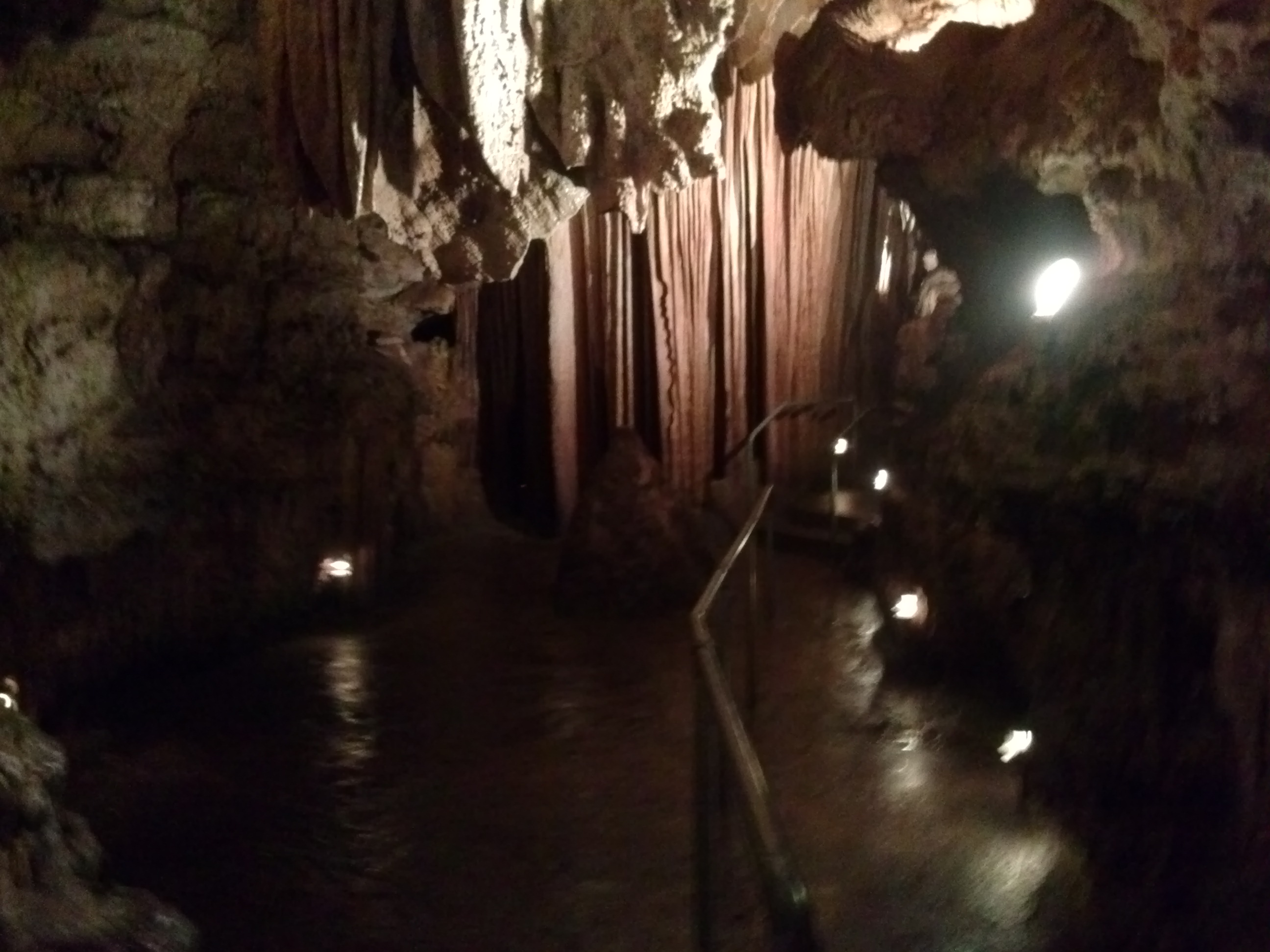
Bridal Chapel

Bridal Cave is a limestone cave located near Camdenton, Missouri, United States, in the Lake of the Ozarks region. The cave is close to a mile long, but only a quarter of it is accessible to the public due to underground lakes. The name refers to a chapter in Indian Romances, a 1933 collection by former owner R.G. Scott, which details an Osage Native American wedding.

According to the book, Conwee, the son of an Osage chief, wanted to marry Wasena, the daughter of another Osage chief. Wasena did not want to marry him, so Conwee and his warriors kidnapped Wasena and her companion, Irona. The group tried to hide the women in the cave, but Wasena escaped and committed suicide to avoid being with Conwee. Irona did not try to escape as she was in love with Buffalo, Conwee's brother. She eventually married Buffalo in the same cave.

The cave has been popular since the 1850s due to its speleothem formations and mineral coloring. The cave's opening was originally 3.0 by 1.5 ft (91 by 46 cm), and the cave itself had limited room for movement. Rooms and tunnels were expanded, and the first five rooms opened to the public on October 16, 1948, for tours. Weddings take place within the Bridal Chapel, which features the aptly-named ‘pipe organ’ formation, a prominent piece of drapery in the second room. Another known feature is Mystery Lake, which is a crystal-clear, 18-foot deep lake created by groundwater mounding following the completion of the Bagnell Dam. The lake has old wooden structures of unknown origins. Sampling the structures for dating purposes was not possible as the wood has disintegrated over time. The second half of the tour opened to the public in 1990.

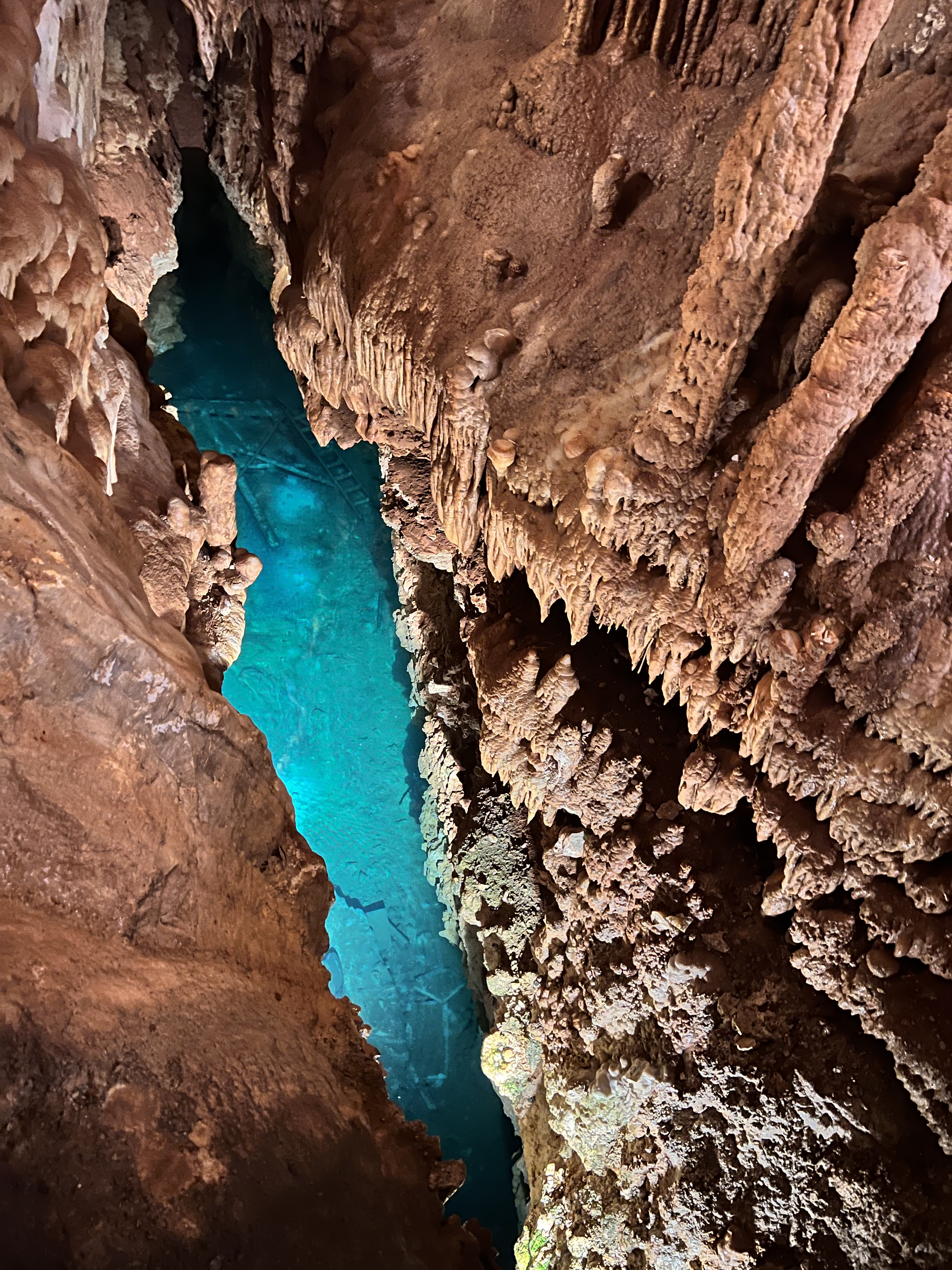
Mystery Lake

Couples can purchase wedding packages for ceremonies in Bridal Cave. The first wedding was hosted June 1, 1949, and as of 2023, over 4,300 weddings have been held at Bridal Cave.
