= Secret Caverns =

Show cave in New York state

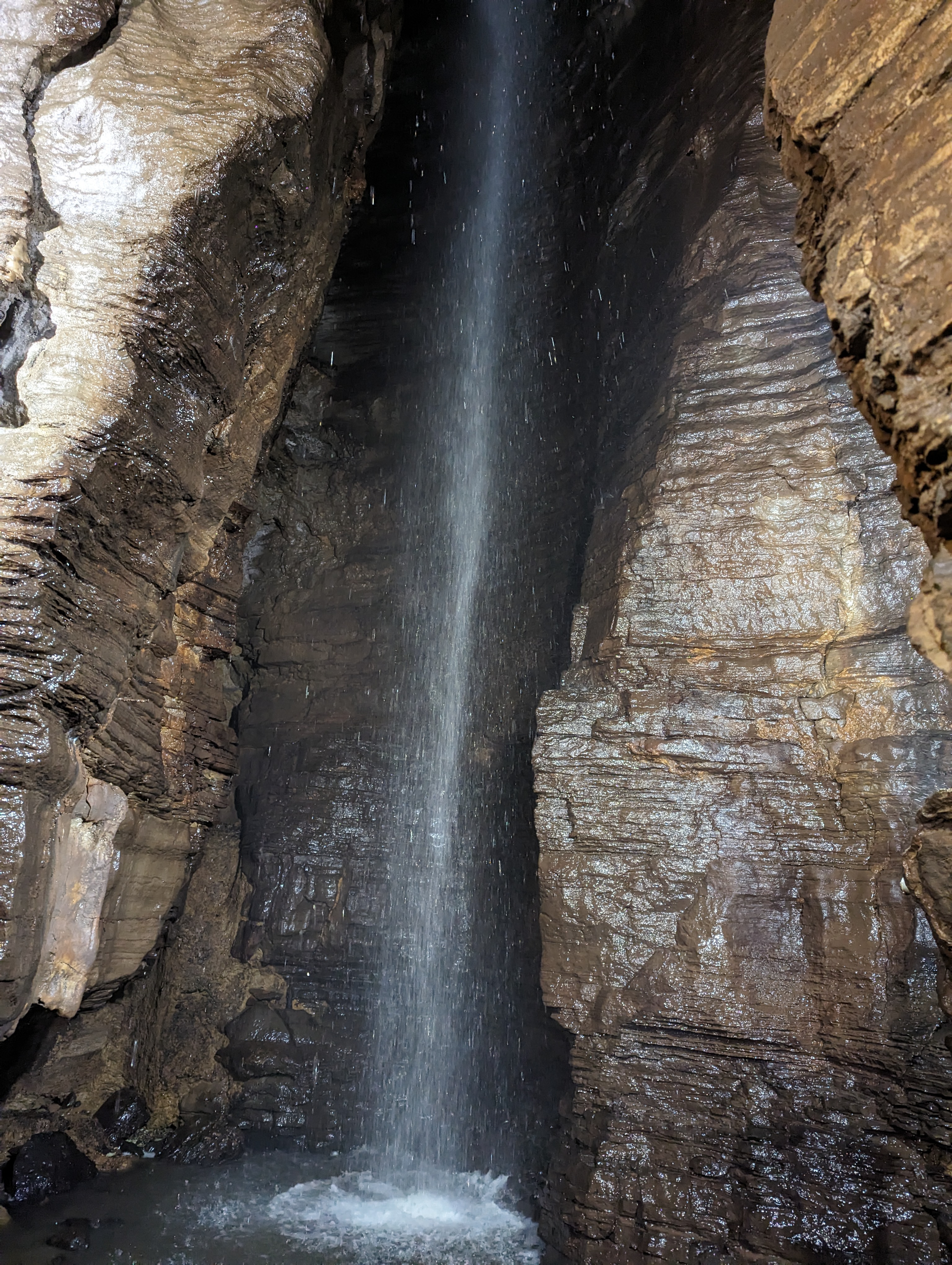
- 100 ft (30 m) waterfall in Secret Caverns

- Location within New York Location within the United States
- Location: Howes Cave, New York
- Coordinates: 42°42′34.344″N 74°23′31.092″W
- Length: 6,200 feet (1,900 m)
- Discovery: 1928 (Secret Caverns), c. 1880 (Bensons Cave)
- Geology: Limestone
- Show cave opened: 1929
- Show cave length: 2,640 feet (800 m)
- Lighting: Incandescent
- Website: Official website

Secret Caverns is a limestone solutional cave, located in Howes Cave, New York. As a show cave, Secret Caverns is open to the public as a tourist attraction, with guides taking visitors through the cave, which features karst and glacial geological features, culminating in a 100 ft (30 m) waterfall.

The cave is also known for its eclectic folk art both on the cave property and around Schoharie County, New York, advertising the cave and differentiating itself from Howe Caverns, a larger show cave just 1.4 miles (2.3 km) away.

== Description ==
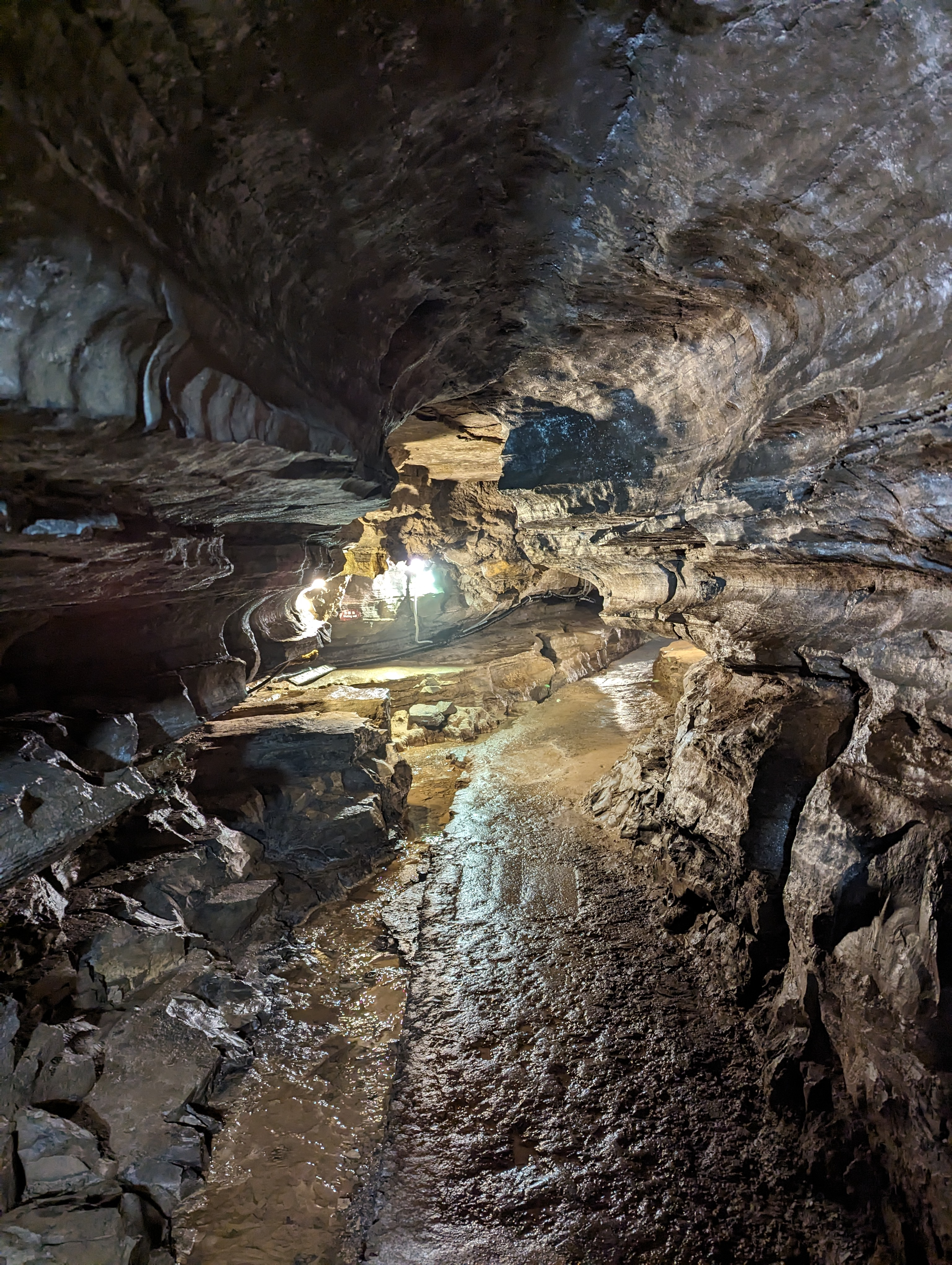
Passage in Secret Caverns

Secret Cave is part of a larger cave system, the Secret-Benson Cave System, which consists of 6,200 feet (1,900 m) of passage.

The show cave starts at the discovery entrance, which has mostly been sealed with concrete with a small opening to allow bats to enter and exit the cave, although bat populations has been low since an outbreak of White-nose syndrome in the cave. 103 concrete steps, referred to Secret Caverns as the "petrified escalator", leads to the main cave passage. The main cave passage consists of a narrow stream-cut passage with few formations, including shallow pools, some flowstone, stalactites, stalagmites and a small column. The tour guides assign names to some of the formations, including "Liberty Bell", "Giant's False Teeth", and "Frozen Niagara". In some places, the cave ceiling increases dramatically in height, caused by ancient glacial waterfalls (moulins) entering the cave during the Last Glacial Period. The tour culminates in the 100 ft (30 m) waterfall. The tour route, from the entrance to the waterfall, consists of 1,320 feet (400 m) of passage, but since tours retrace their steps upon reaching the waterfall the tour distance is 2,640 feet (800 m) .

Beyond the waterfall is another 4,880 feet (1,490 m) feet of passage, Bensons Cave, which is owned by the Northeastern Cave Conservancy as a recreational wild cave. Bensons Cave is entered through Bensons Pit, a 60 feet (18 m) free-rappel drop, and consists of a mixture of wet and dry passages with a small waterfall. Although Secret Cave and Bensons Cave are one single system, it is prohibited to enter Secret Cave from Bensons Cave.

== Geology ==
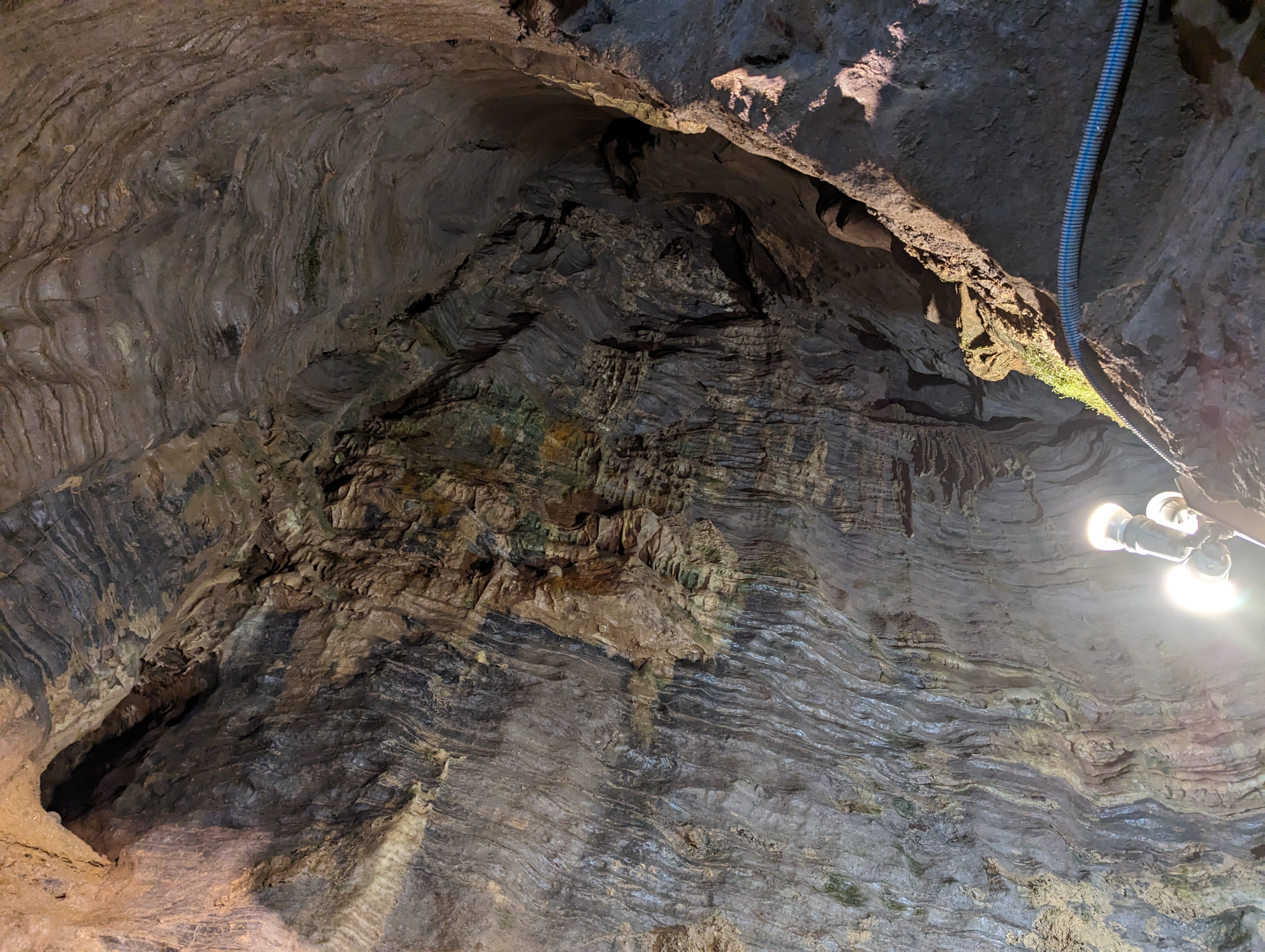
This tall dome was created by a moulin (a glacial waterfall) during the Last Glacial Period. Flowstone is also visible on the walls.

The Secret-Benson Cave System, of which Secret Caverns is a part of, is a solutional cave formed by chemical weathering of rock, mainly limestone by rainwater. As part of the Helderberg Plateau, the cave, like others in the region such as Howe Caverns and Tory Cave, is formed in the thickly beded Lower Devonian aged Coeymans Limestone and Upper Silurian aged Manlius Limestone, both part of the Helderberg Group. Most of the cave is in Manlius Limestone, although the entrance passage is in the fossil-rich Coeymans Limestone and extinct Honeycomb Coral can be seen on the walls of the cave. The cave has been found to be hydrologically connected to nearby Howes Caverns by dye tracing.

Although the Secret-Benson Cave System, at 380,000 years old, formed before the Last Glacial Period, the cave was profoundly effected by glaciation. The cave exhibits glaciokarst features such as glacial till, infilled domes and large glacial domes. Furthermore, around 14,000 years ago the cave system was inundated by Glacial Lake Schoharie, causing further build-up of glacial sediment in the cave.

== History ==
The cave was discovered in the summer of 1928 after two cows, drawn by the cool cave air, fell into an entrance of the cave. The cave, then owned by Stanton Farms, was purchased in 1928 by civil engineer Roger Mallery, who earlier renovated nearby Howe Caverns, and whose descendants still own the cave. The cave was first explored by five teenagers hired by Mallery, who discovered the 100 ft (30 m) waterfall, and by August 1929, the cave was open to tourism. The cave initially fared poorly in the face of stiff competition from the nearby and larger Howe Caverns, but the replacement of the initial ropes which visitors used to climb into the cave with a steel ladder and later concrete stairs increased tourism considerably. From 1961 to 1971, the cave was also a fallout shelter. On August 22, 1995, the cave was a victim of arson, which burnt down the visitor's lodge. The lodge was rebuilt and tours resumed in 1996.

== Folk art ==
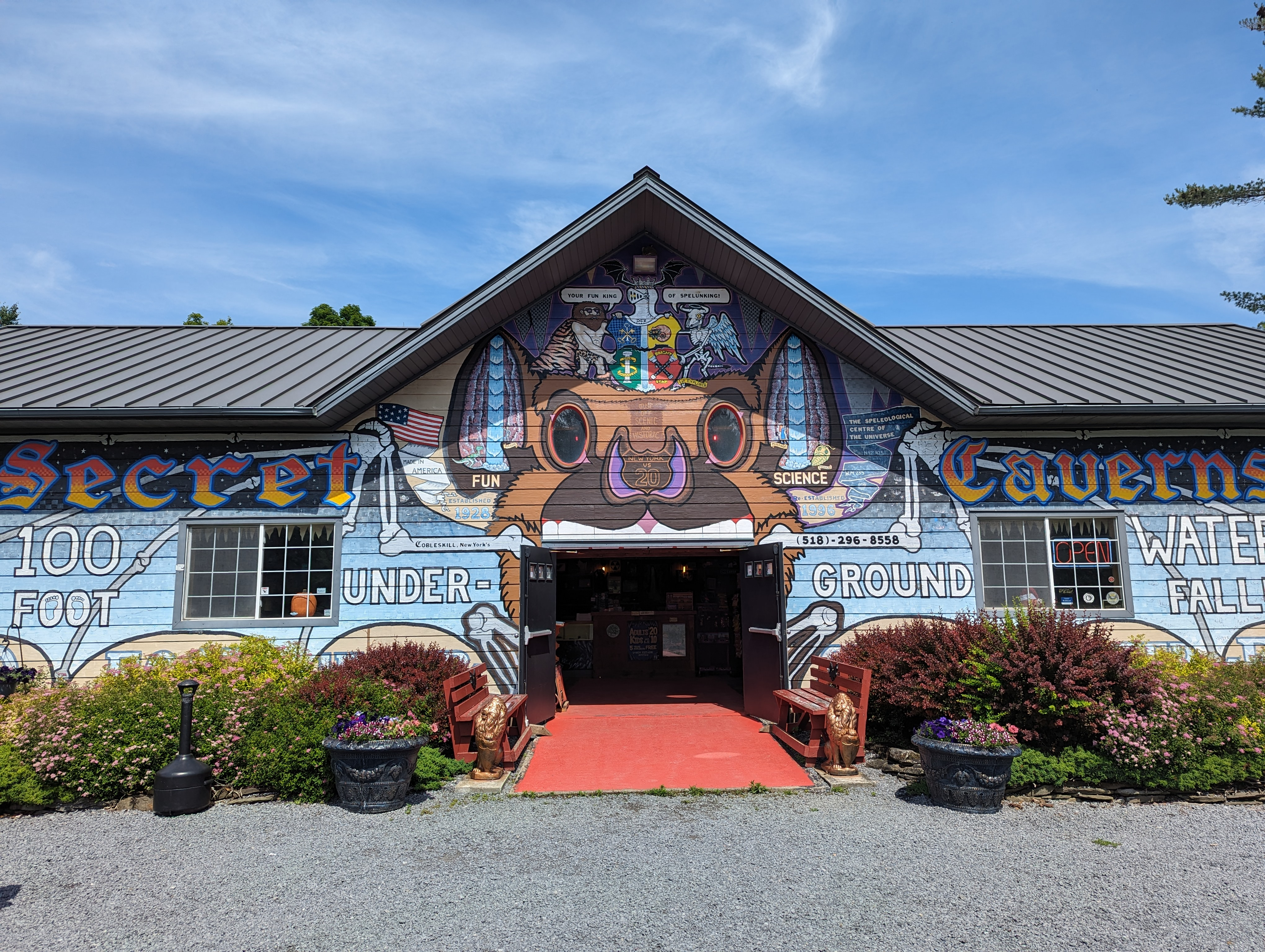
The lodge at Secret Caverns.

Secret Caverns is known for its folk art, both on the cave property and on the dozens of billboards advertising the cave scattered throughout Schoharie County. Secret Cavern's eclectic style of folk art advertising developed during the late 1980s and early 1990s by muralist Kurt Piller and cave tour guide Todd DelMarter after being fired from Howe Caverns, and has been described as "psychedelic", "quirky" and "kitsch". Secret Caverns billboards often depict of a caveman with sunglasses, the cave's mascot, the cave's waterfall, humorous phrases and references to pop-culture.
