= Howe Caverns =

Cave located in upstate New York

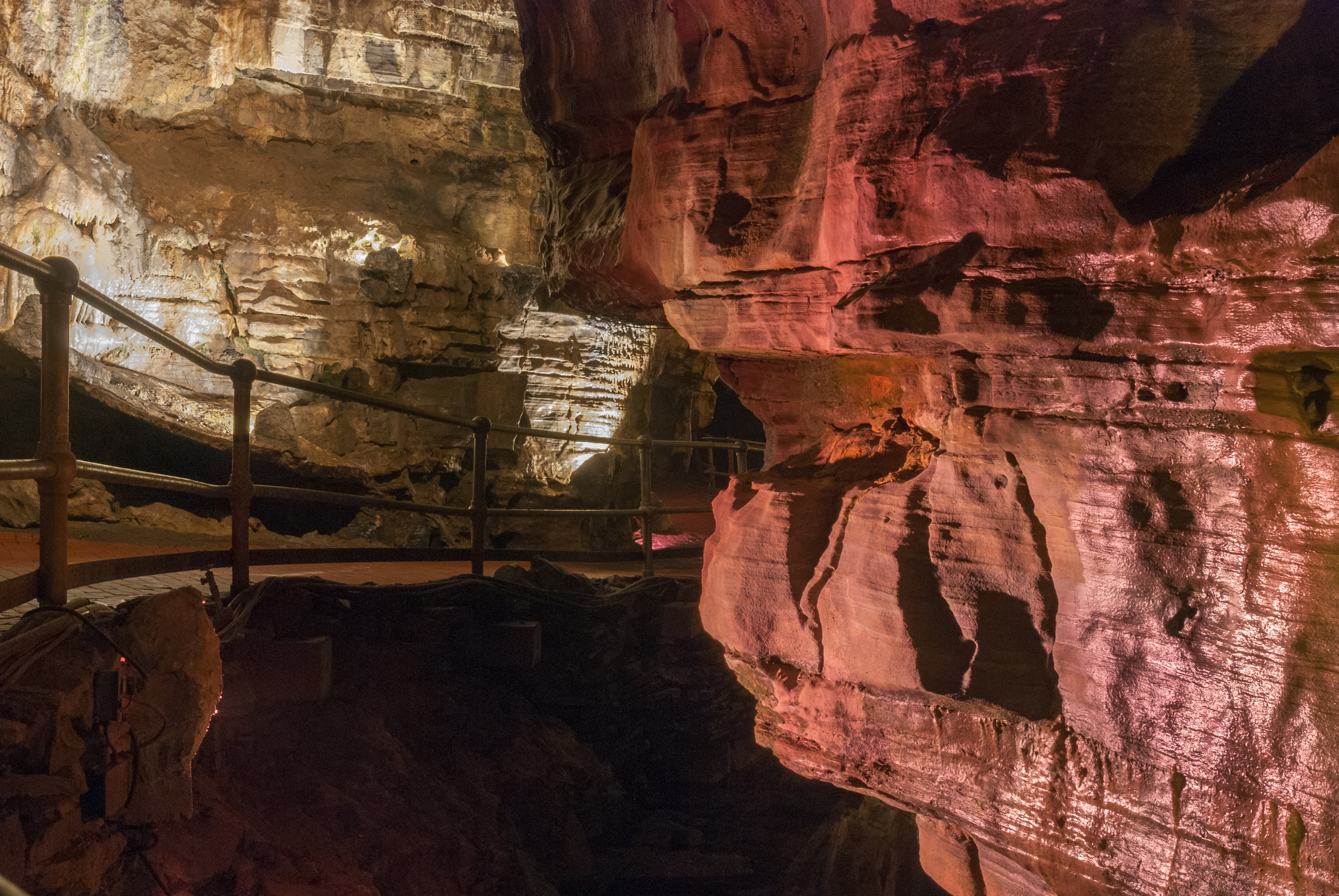
- Passage in Howe Caverns

- Location within New York Location within the United States
- Location: Howes Cave, New York
- Coordinates: 42°41′47.544″N 74°23′54.996″W
- Depth: 156 feet (48 m)
- Length: 6,200 feet (1,900 m)
- Discovery: 1842
- Geology: Limestone
- Show cave opened: 1929
- Show cave length: 7,920 feet (2,410 m)
- Lighting: Electric
- Website: Official website

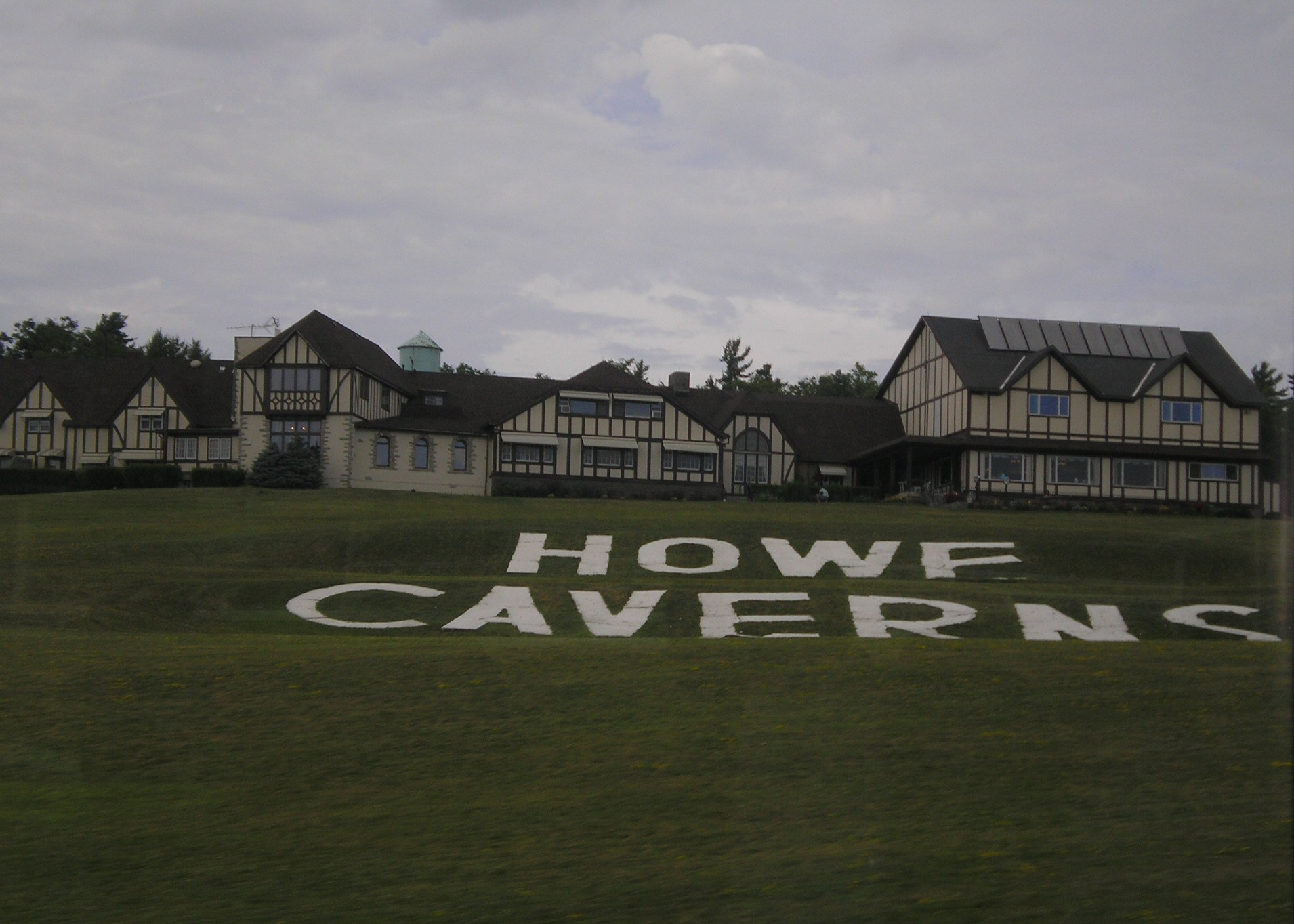
Outside view of the caverns

Howe Caverns is a limestone solutional cave, operated as a show cave, in the hamlet of Howes Cave, Schoharie County, New York. Howe Caverns is a popular tourist attraction, providing visitors with a sense of caving or spelunking, without needing the advanced equipment and training usually associated with such adventures.

== Description ==
With a tour length of 7,920 feet (2,410 m), Howes Cavern is the largest show cave in the Northeastern United States. Visitors take elevators down to the main passage, a large phreatic tube up to 10 metres (33 ft) tall and 6 metres (20 ft) wide. Guides lead visitors on a 500 metres (1,600 ft) walk parallel to the River Styx, a subterranean river, passing by speleothems assigned names such as "The Sentinels", the "Bridal Altar" and the "Titan's Fireplace". After walking through Titan's Temple, the largest chamber in the cave, visitors embark on a short 402 metres (1,319 ft) boat ride, after which they retrace their steps to a snaking and narrow down-dip tributary canyon, the Winding Way. The tour concludes with an artificial tunnel to the elevator.

== Geology ==
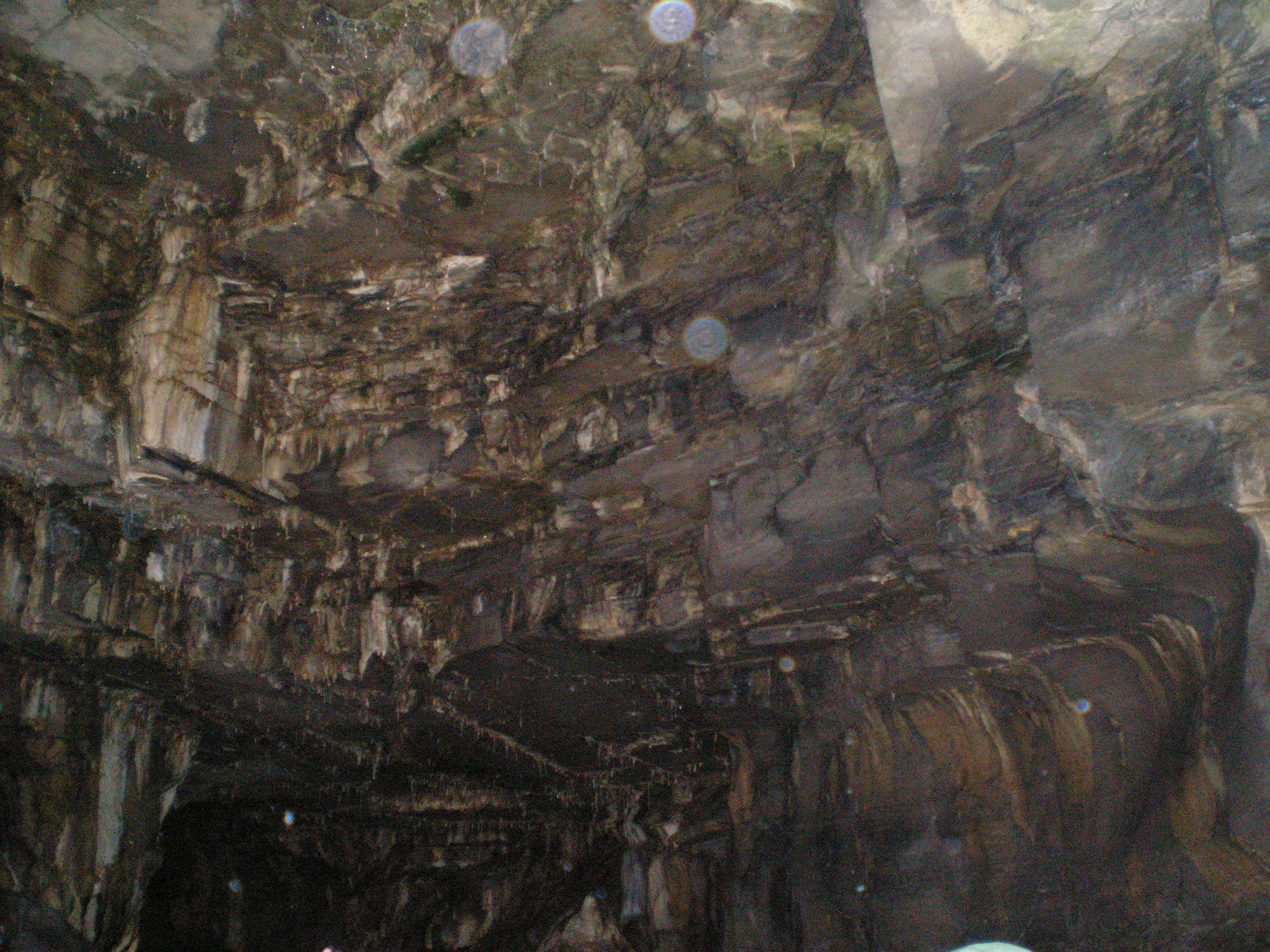
Inside the caverns

Howe Caverns is a solutional cave formed by the dissolution of limestone rock. The cave, like many on the Helderberg Plateau, such as Secret Caverns, which is also operated as a show cave, and Tory Cave, is composed of thickly bedded Lower Devonian aged Coeymans Limestone and thinly bedded Upper Silurian aged Manlius Limestone, both part of the Helderberg Group. Both formations were formed by sediment buildup under an ancient inland sea, which was eroded in the Cenozoic to become the Helderberg Plateau.

The cave which lies 156 feet (48 m) deep, began forming several million years ago as water incised deeply into the Heidelberg Plateau's limestone, joining the Cobleskill Creek and forming caves and karst features. The cave is thought to have formed at a similar time and be physically connected to nearby McFail's Cave, although the connection is impassible due to sediment buildup. Both caves, as well as Secret Caverns, were also found to be hydrologically connected by dye tracing the nearby caves to Howe Cavern's River Styx. Ancient faults are present within the cave, although the cave itself does not seem to be fault-controlled.

The cave, although formed prior to the Last Glacial Period, was profoundly altered by the glaciations. The connection between McFail's Cave and Howe Caverns was severed by glacial sediment, and glaciokarst features such as glacial till, rhythmites and ponded water deposits. Additionally, approximately 14,000 years ago after the retreat of the glaciers, the cave was inundated by Glacial Lake Schoharie, causing substantial buildup of more glacial deposits and clays.

== Discovery and development ==
External audio
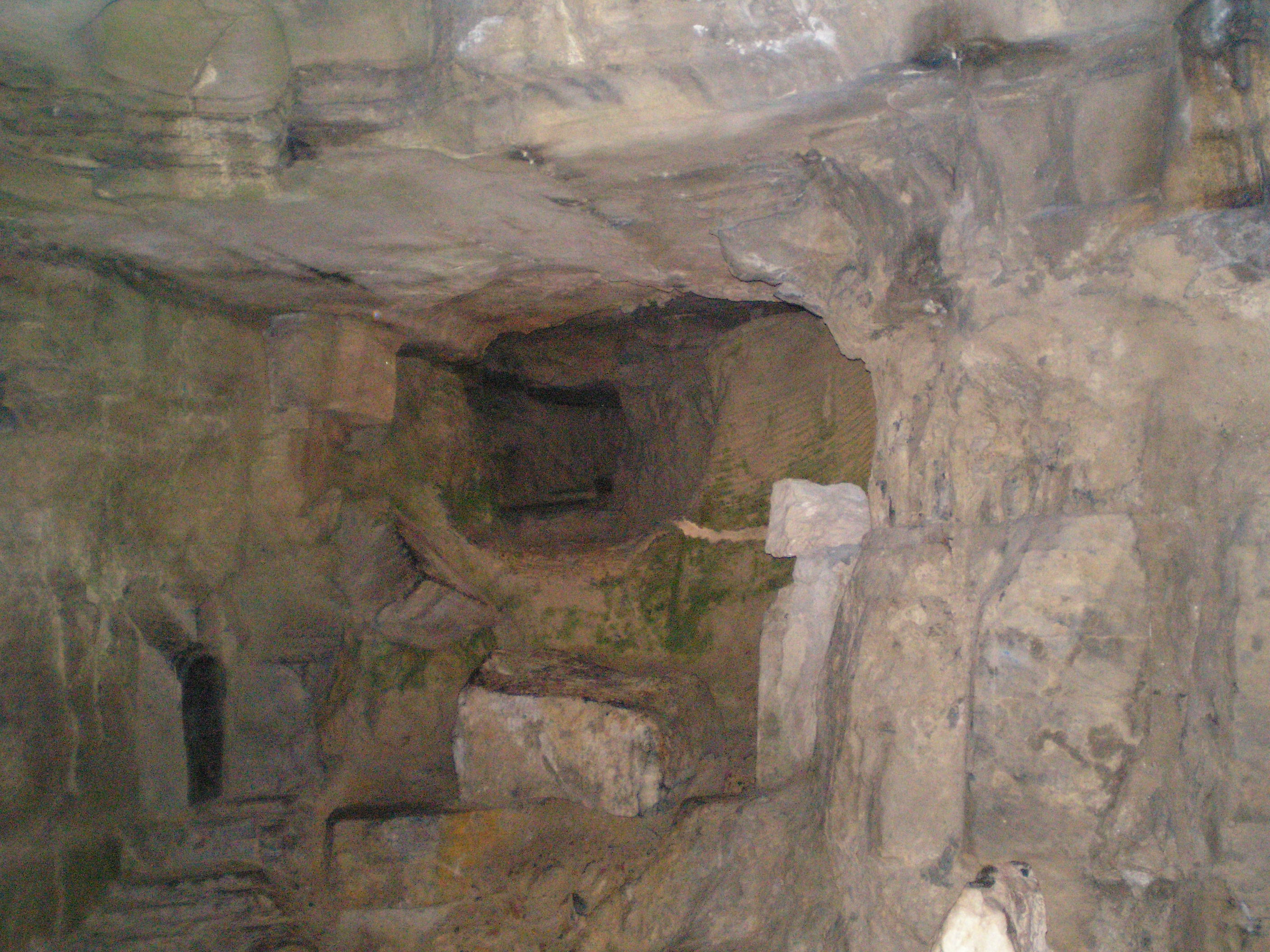
- “Episode 171: Underground Worlds”, Science History Institute

Howe Caverns is named after farmer Lester Howe, who discovered the cave on May 22, 1842, after noticing that his cows frequently gathered near bushes at the bottom of a hill on hot summer days. Behind the bushes, Howe found a strong, cool breeze emanating from a hole in the Earth. Howe proceeded to dig out and explore the cave with his friend and neighbor, Henry Wetsel, on whose land the cave entrance was located. The cave is a constant temperature of 52 °F (11 °C), irrespective of the outside weather.

Howe opened the cave to eight-hour public tours in 1843, and, as business grew, a hotel was built over the entrance. When Howe encountered financial difficulties, he sold off parts of his property until a limestone quarry purchased the remainder. The quarry's purchase included the hillside, which encompassed the cave's natural entrance.

Eventually, the cave was closed to the public, until an organization was formed in 1927 to reopen it. The organization spent the next two years undertaking development work to create an alternative entrance into the cave. After completion of the work – including elevators, brick walkways, lighting, and handrails – the cave was reopened to visitors on Memorial Day, May 1929.

A few months later in August 1929, another show cave, Secret Caverns, was opened just 1.4 miles (2.3 km) away. The two caves became engaged in a decades-long bitter rivalry for tourists, although in recent years relations between the two caves have been friendlier.

== Developments since 2000 ==
In 2008, the cave was purchased by a new private concern. In 2011, an adventure park attraction was assembled at the site, and it has been expanded since then.

In May 2015, Howe Caverns officials re-opened the natural entrance of the cave to public tours. The newly opened section of the cavern had not been seen since 1900, as the property had been owned by a succession of cement companies since the late 1800s.

Howe Caverns has several tours, including a 90-minute walking tour with a boat ride and a two-and-a-half hour spelunking tour. The expanded tour features the remains of Howe's original tourist boat and signatures in the rock left by 19th-century cavern visitors.

Howe Caverns is also a wedding venue. Weddings are performed atop a heart-shaped calcite formation in the cave.
