= Tory cave =

Tory cave may refer to:

- Tory Cave (Albany, New York) -- a cave in the Helderberg Escarpment where a Crown Loyalist is said to have hidden during the American Revolution
- Tory's Cave (New Milford, Connecticut) -- a cave on the Housatonic Range Trail
