= Black River Escarpment =

Black River Escarpment may refer to:

- Black River Escarpment (Ontario), marks the edge of the Canadian Shield, from Lake Huron to Lake Ontario.
- Black River Escarpment (Wisconsin), run parallel to the Niagara Escarpment, west of Lake Michigan.
