= Housatonic Range Trail =

Hiking trail in Connecticut, United States

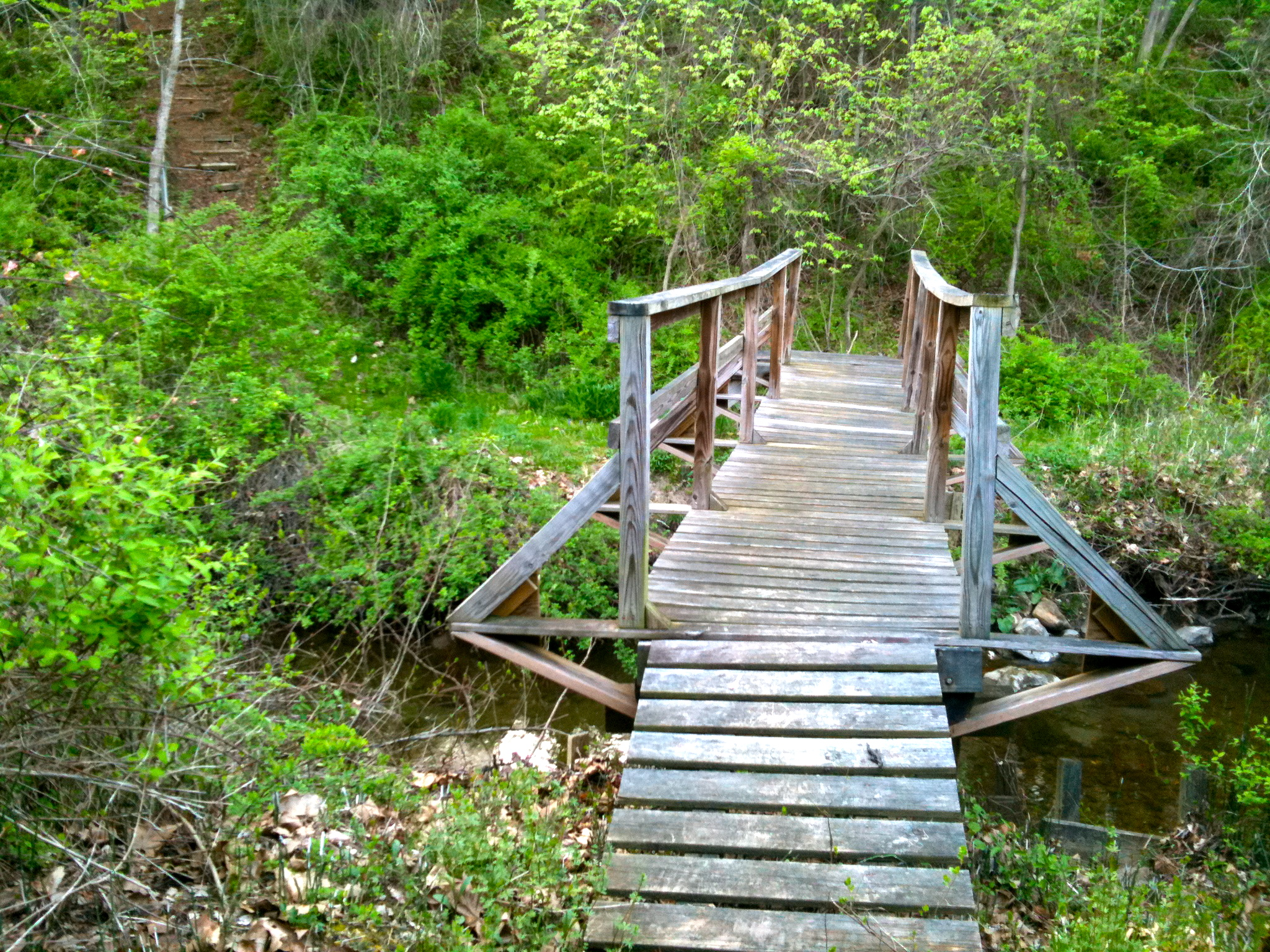
- Footbridge over Morrisey Brook on Housatonic Range Trail, Gaylordsville section of New Milford, Connecticut.
- Length: 6.2 mi (10.0 km)
- Location: New Milford Connecticut
- Designation: CFPA Blue-Blazed Trail
- Trailheads: Candlewood Mountain summit 41.5801°N 73.4531°W; Gaylordsville Cemetery on Gaylord Road in Gaylordsville, Connecticut 41.6316°N 73.4832°W
- Use: hiking, snowshoeing, fishing, geocaching, other
- Highest point: Candlewood Mountain summit, 971 ft (296 m)
- Lowest point: Yellow-dot Spur side trail head on CT-7 near Housatonic River, 350 ft (110 m)
- Difficulty: easy, with some difficult sections (bypass routes available)
- Sights: Housatonic River, Candlewood Mountain, Tory's Cave, Kelly's Slide and Cave, "Suicide Ledges", "Corkscrew"
- Hazards: hunters, deer ticks, poison ivy

The Housatonic Range Trail is a 6.2-mile (10.0 km) Blue-Blazed hiking trail on Candlewood Mountain in the town of New Milford. The north-south axis of the trail parallels the Housatonic River through private land and land trust (e.g. Weantinoge Heritage Land Trust) parcels. The Housatonic Range Trail is maintained largely through the efforts of the Connecticut Forest and Park Association, which provides online Blue Trail maps.

The Housatonic Range Trail (a.k.a. "HuRT") is primarily used as a through-hike or bird-watching. The trail consists of several quiet woodland segments, with terrain ranging from riparian valley to ridgeline escarpments; it is intersected in a handful of places by small country lanes where car-parking slots are very convenient but of limited size. Thus, the trail is taken as one through-hike, or a series of shorter hikes. The northern end of the trail veers slightly westward away from the Housatonic River.

Notable features include: the only true cave in Connecticut, although it is closed to protect a bat colony; a few modest high points with views of the Housatonic River valley, Candlewood Mountain, Kelly's Slide, Pine Knob, Boardman Mountain and the Straits Rock ridge top. There are several boulder/rock formations (including the "Corkscrew") and stone fences. There is one segment of the trail which is very close to residential areas (Concord Way).

== Trail description ==
The Housatonic Range Trail is primarily used for hiking, backpacking, picnicking, bird-watching and in the winter, snowshoeing.

Site-specific activities enjoyed along the route include hunting (very limited), fishing, bouldering, rock climbing and spelunking are ideal activities for experienced practitioners. Almost all of the trail is not suitable for, nor is it used for, cross-country skiing or mountain biking.

The trail is wooded, rocky and has a number of elevation changes except for a very short road walk at the Candlewood Mountain Road and Connecticut Route 37 intersection.

=== Trail route ===
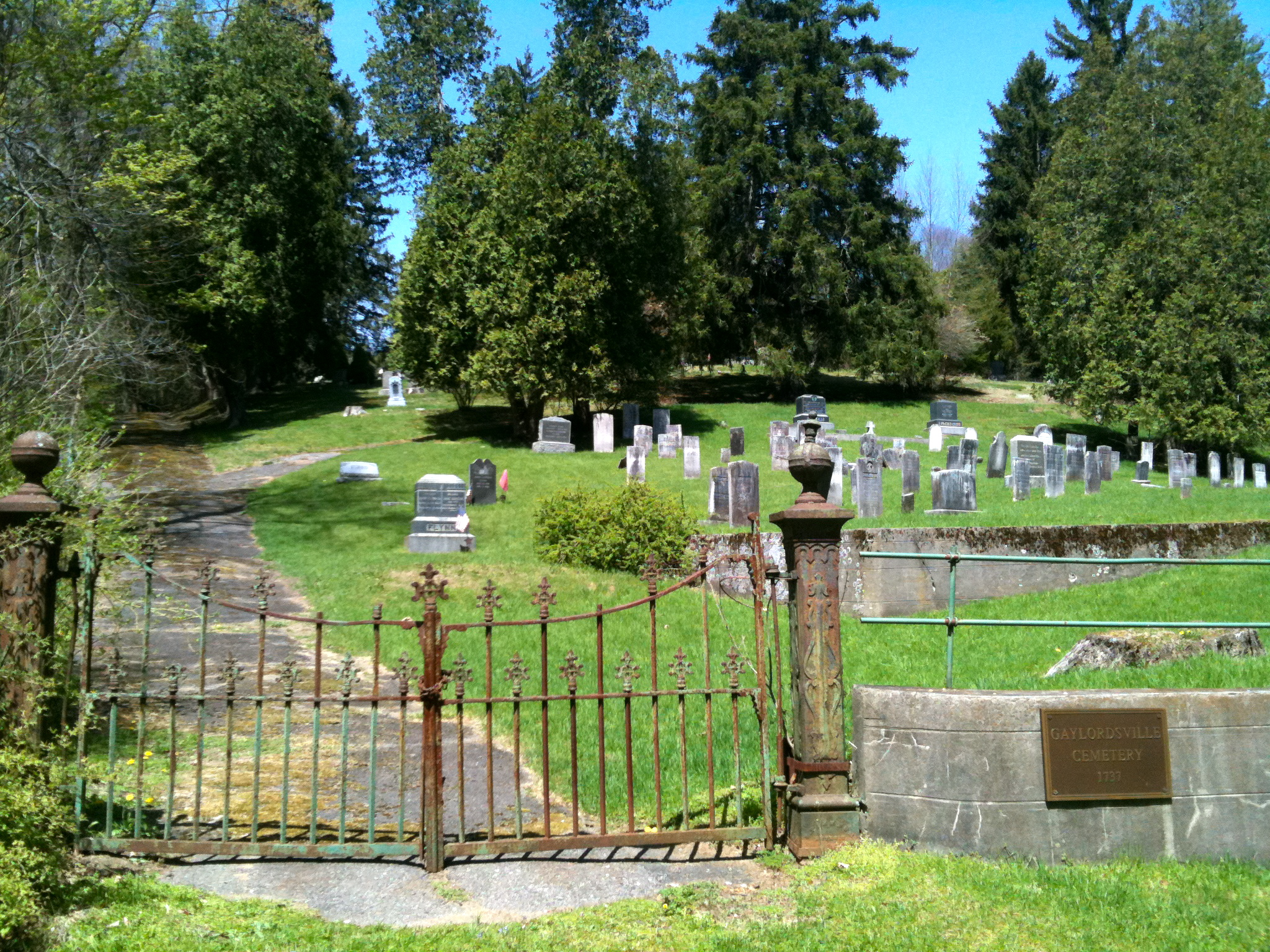
Cemetery, Northern Terminus and parking area for Housatonic Range Trail on Gaylord Road in Gaylordsville, Connecticut.

The southern segment of the Housatonic Range Trail ends at the summit of Candlewood Mountain in New Milford Connecticut; this is one-and-a-half miles south of the parking lot and trail head at the junction of CT-37 and Candlewood Mountain Road. This is a strenuous up-and-back hike of 3 miles. There are short side trails for exploration of Kelly's Slide.

The middle sections of the HuRT contain a short road walk on Concord Way and Connecticut Route 37 near the trail's intersection with Candlewood Mountain Road. The trail crosses Squash Hollow Road twice; allowing for access and limited parking. The middle segments are best known for their interesting boulder fields and rock formations.

The northern segment runs from the Gaylordsville Cemetery to Route 7 near Tory's Cave. There is a small parking area on Gaylord Street on the cemetery side; the trail descends to a wooden foot bridge which crosses a brook; it then rises over two ridgelines and ends at a larger parking lot near Tory's Cave beside Route 7, next to the Housatonic River.

=== Trail communities ===
The Housatonic Range Trail is contained in New Milford, Connecticut. The south end is in the Candlewood Mountain (and Lake) area. The northern end is in the Gaylordsville area.

== Landscape, geology, and natural environment ==
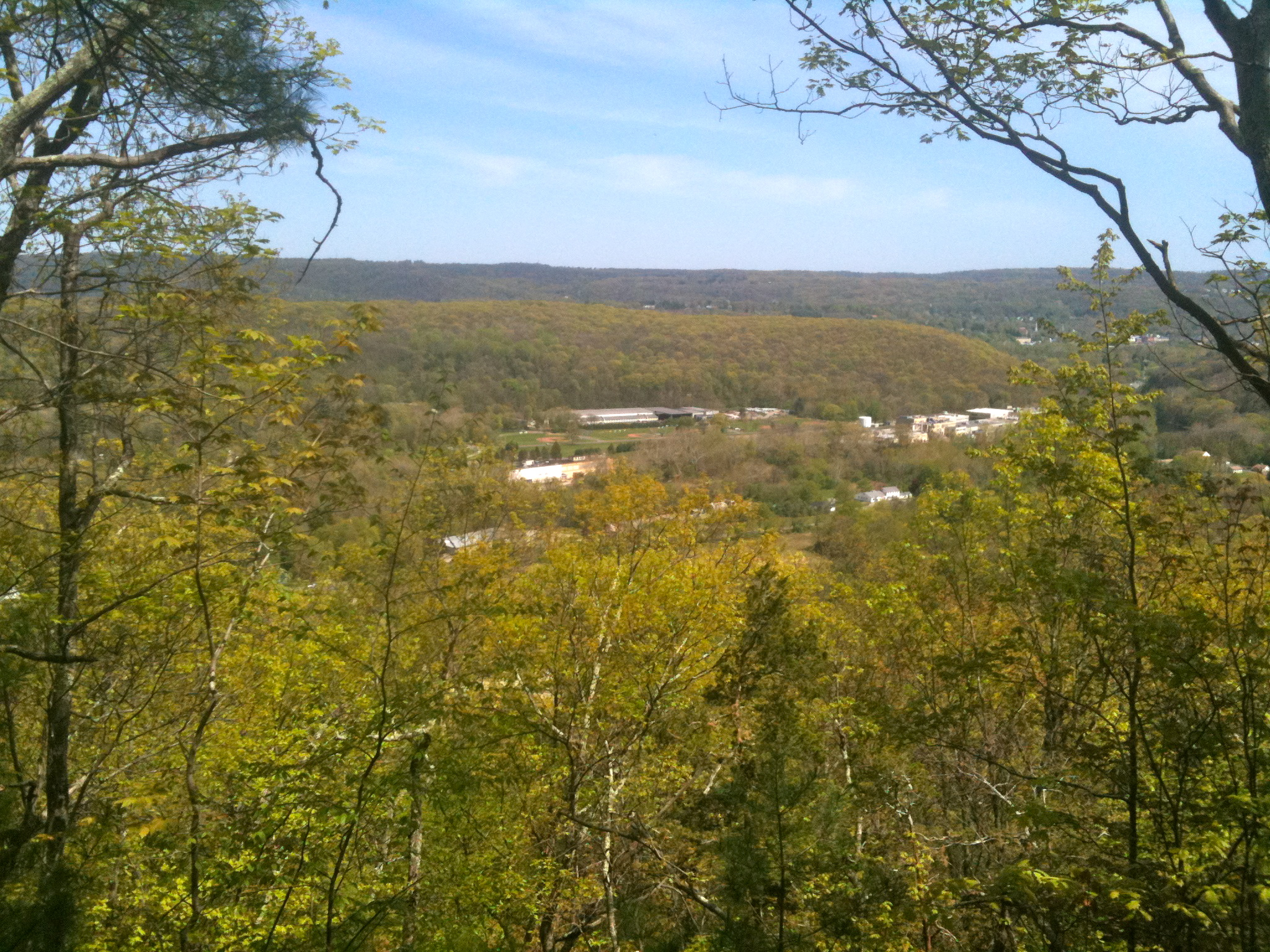
View of Housatonic River valley and Connecticut Route 7 (Kent Rd) from Pine Knob summit.

== History and folklore ==
The Housatonic Range Blue-Blazed Trail was created by the Connecticut Forest and Park Association. The entire trail or sometimes just the section south of Connecticut Route 37 is also often referred to as the Candlewood Mountain Trail.

=== Origin and name ===
Housatonic ("usi-a-di-en-uk") is derived from the Mohican phrase "beyond the mountain".

This Housatonic was and is the name of a river which begins in Massachusetts and flow through the western extreme of Massachusetts and Connecticut before turning to the south-east, merging with the Naugatuck River (the largest tributary) in Shelton before emptying into Long Island Sound between Stratford and Milford Connecticut.

The Housatonic Range has also become the unofficial name for the area between New Milford and Gaylordsville near the Housatonic River.

Native Americans traveled the Housatonic and its tributaries extensively for trading, hunting, fishing as well as for their annual summer migration to the Long Island Sound shore and winter migration to inland forests. The Dutch, under Adrian Block, are believed to have been the first Europeans to explore the Housatonic River and quickly establishing seasonal fur trading camps with Native American tribes. They built at least one fort on the Housatonic River. To the chagrin of the Dutch, English settlers on the Connecticut shoreline (in Milford and New Haven) began to trade with the Native American tribes up and down the Housatonic and seized the unoccupied Dutch fort without firing weapons.

The Housatonic Range Trail is believed to follow the route of a Native American trail.

=== Historic sites ===
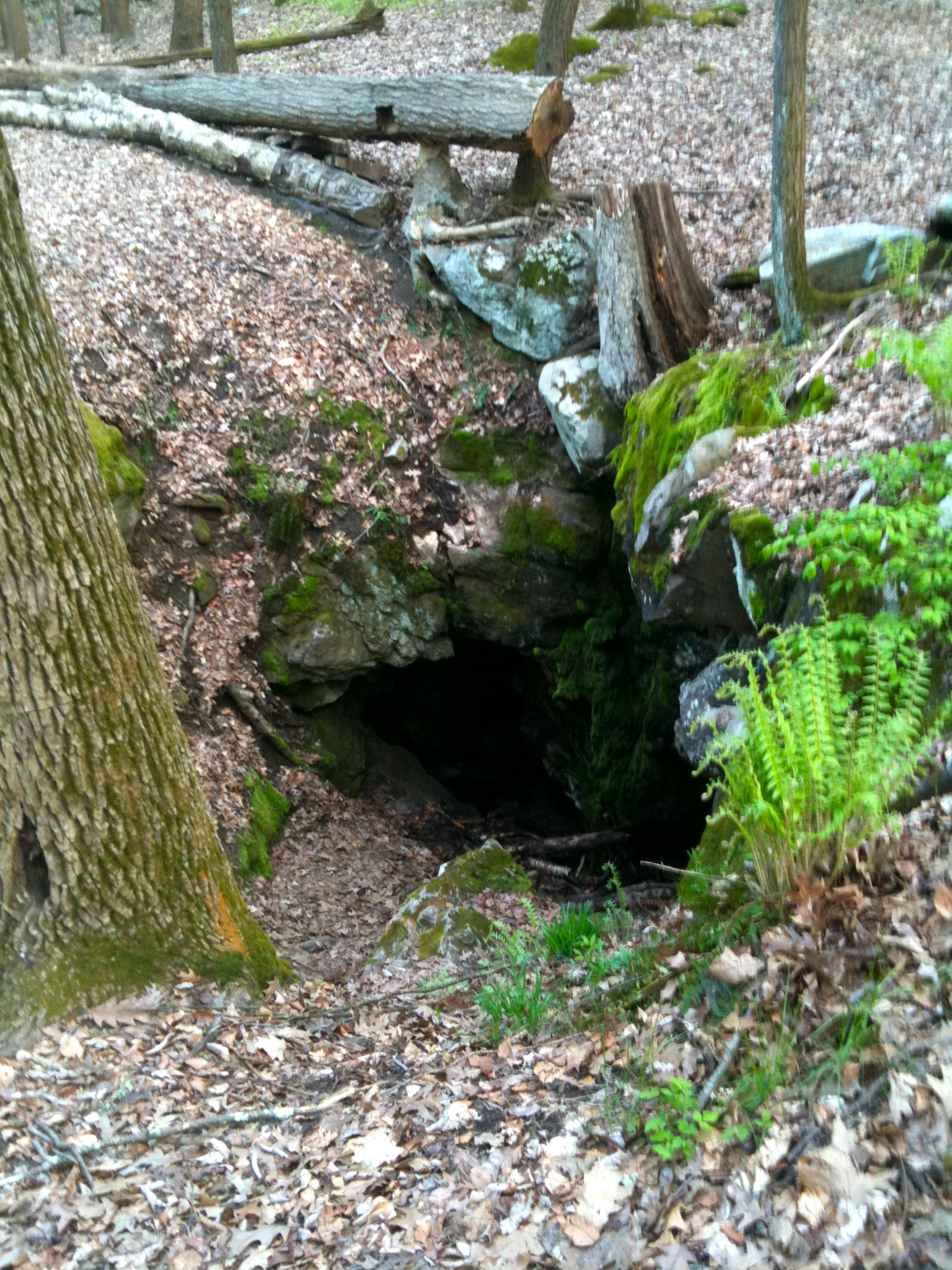
Tory's Cave.

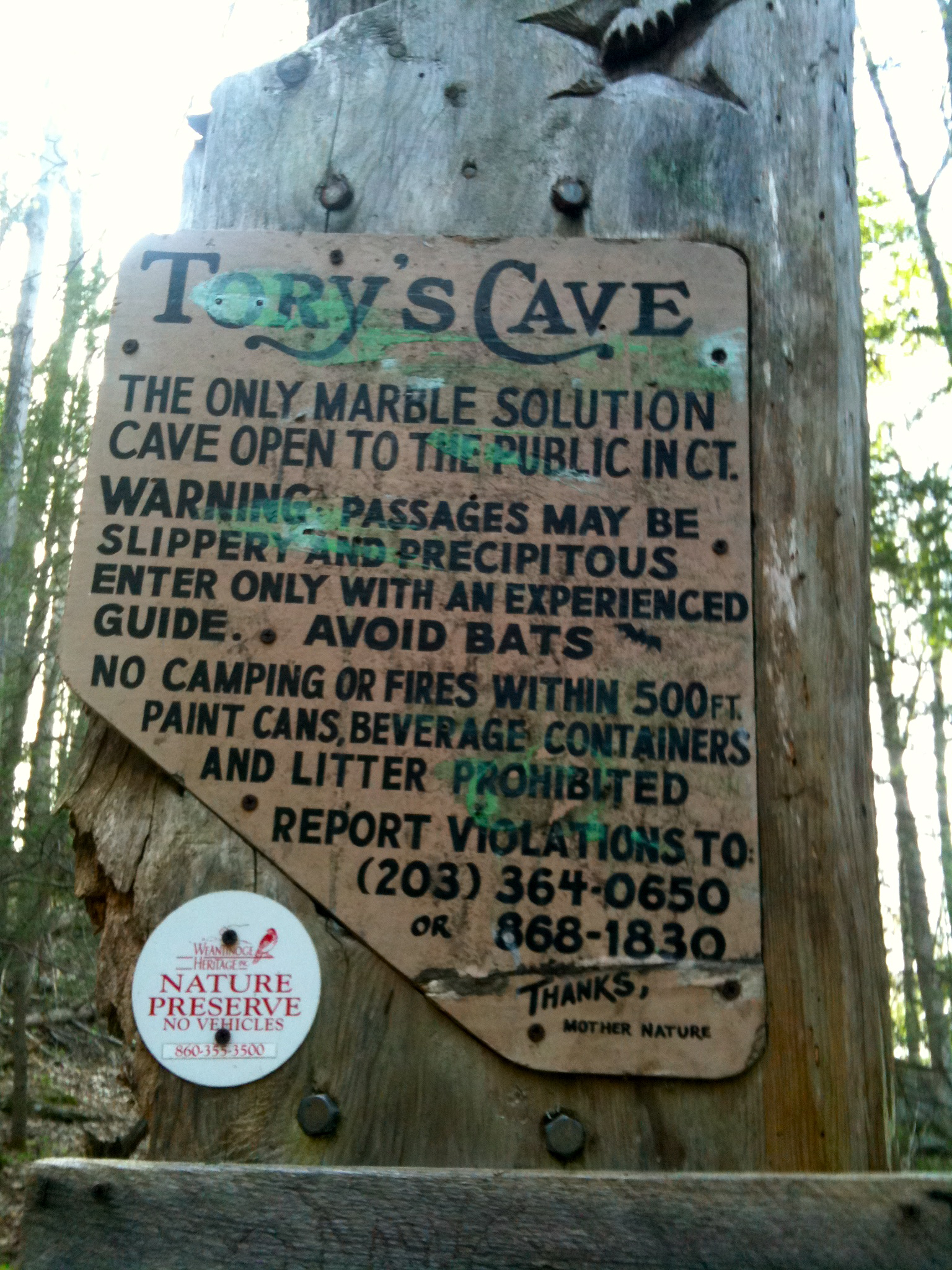
Tory's Cave Sign.

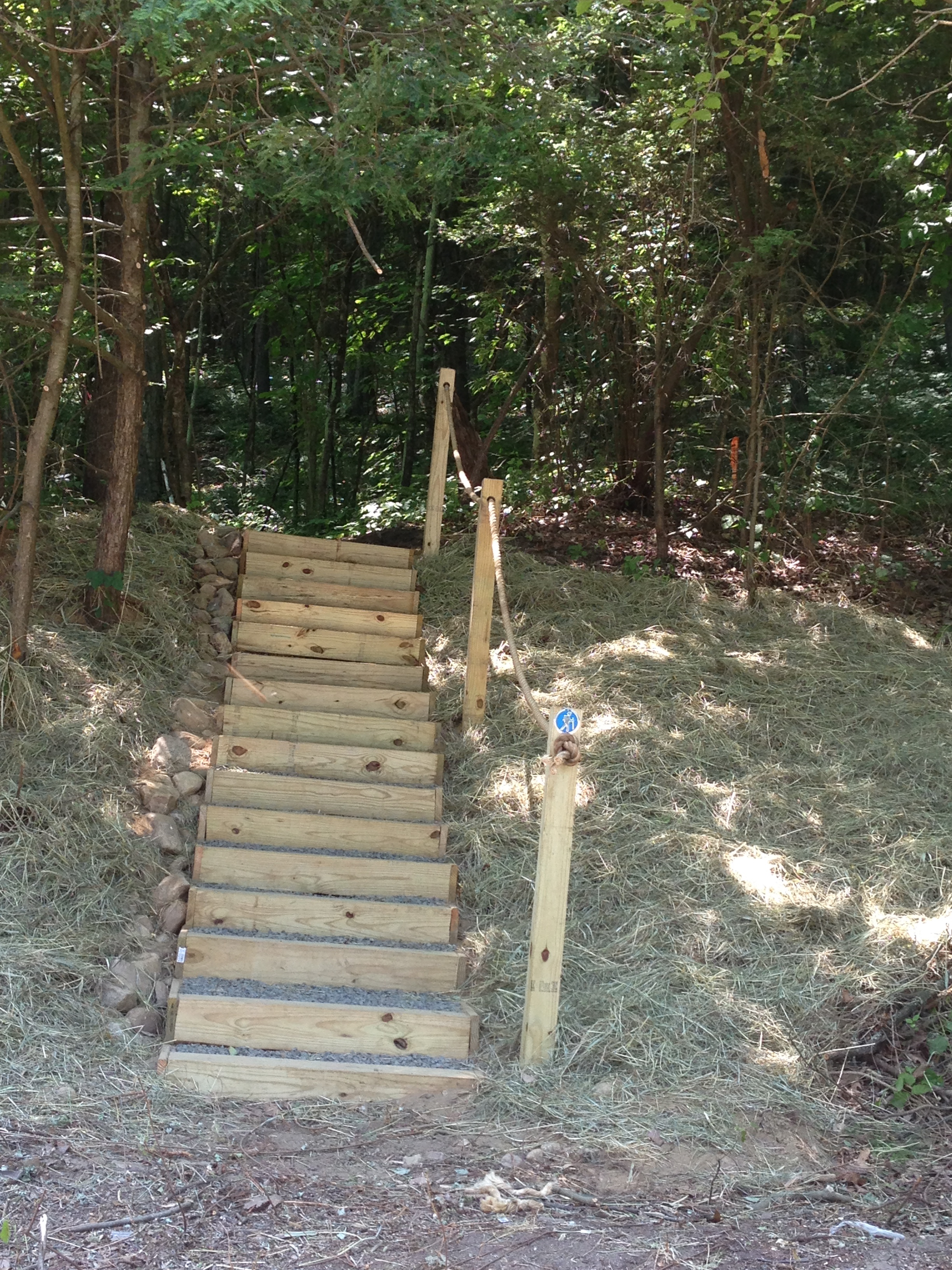
Trailhead: Route 7 parking to Tory Cave

The Tory's Cave is the only natural "marble" true cave (created by water dripping and wearing away rock rather than by upheavals in the earth and rock) in Connecticut. A legend that Tories hid in the cave during the Revolutionary war has no factual basis. The cave is narrow at the opening, parts of it are physically closed off and it is wet inside with parts occupied by bats with "White Nose Syndrome". There is a warning sign outside the cave opening with safety rules including one that only experienced spelunkers should enter it; however, it is CLOSED indefinitely to protect the bats. Do not enter.

There are several public recreational areas close to the Housatonic Range Trail which have historic significance and are worth visiting for visitors to the area.

Candlewood Lake was the first man-made body of water created just for water stored as potential energy. It was created using several dams, one river and water pumped in from the Housatonic River. Today it is the largest lake in Connecticut and a major recreation area. As the average depth of the lake is only forty (40) feet scuba divers can find submerged houses, cars and airplane wrecks.

Candlewood Lake is named after Candlewood Mountain which was named for the bright burning strips of pine which Native Americans taught the early settlers to make as wax candle substitutes.

Squantz Pond State Park and the neighboring Pootatuck State Forest are located on the opposite side of Candlewood Lake from the Housatonic Range Trail.

Lover's Leap State Park at the northern shore of Lake Lillinonah contains many historic ruins and is the legendary location for the suicide leap of Princess Lillinonah.

== Hiking the trail ==
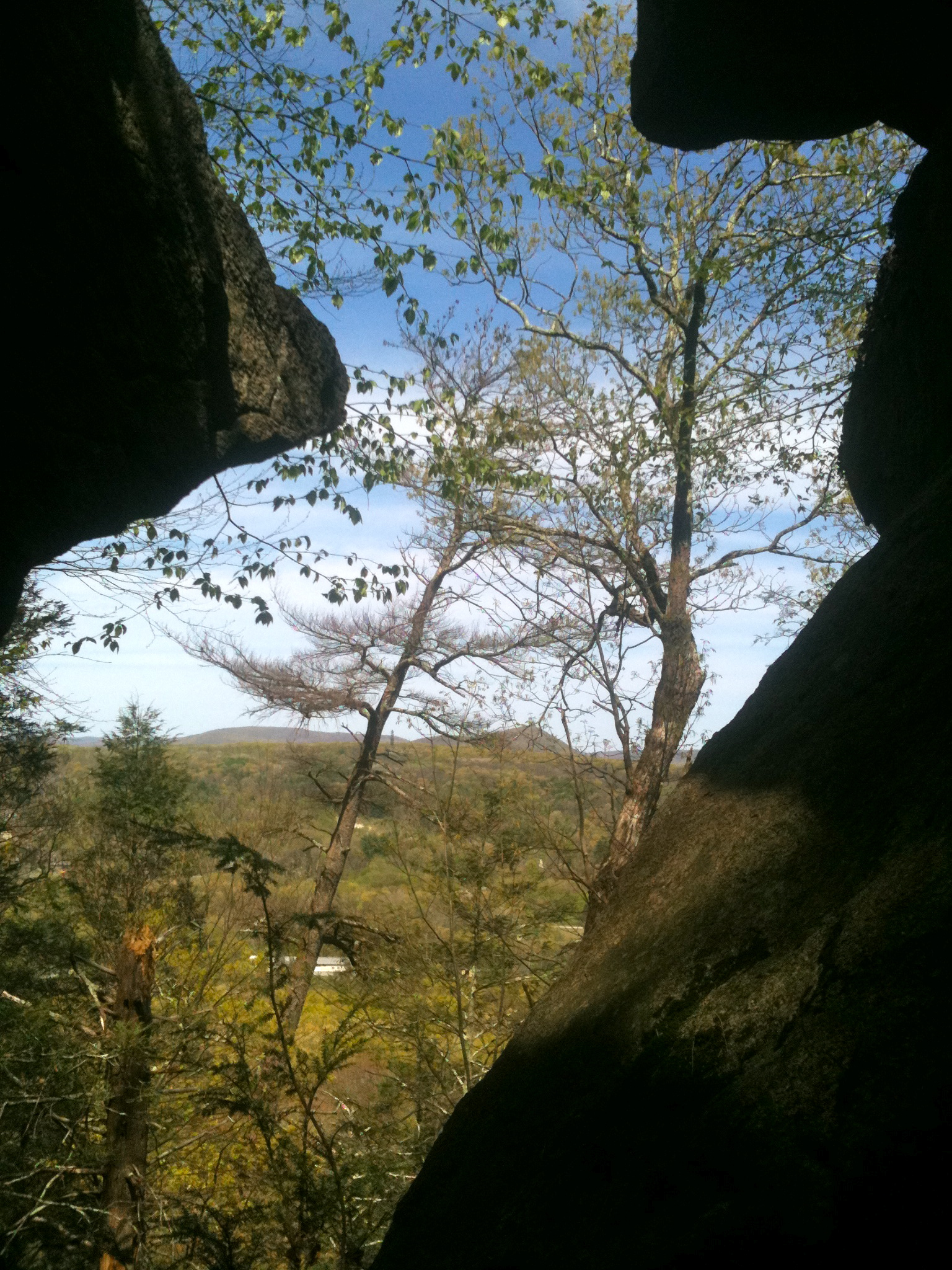
View looking out from inside the "cave" under Kelly's Slide near Candlewood Mountain.

The mainline Housatonic Range trail is blazed with blue rectangles. It is regularly maintained, and is considered easy hiking, with very few sections of rugged and moderately difficult hiking (notably just the climb up to the northern high point near the great Oak tree).

Much of the Housatonic Range Trail is close to water and though some swamp areas inland are prone to flooding the trail along the lake shore is mostly on very high ground. There are no camping facilities along the trail and primitive camping is prohibited in most locations on the route. Trail descriptions are available from a number of commercial and non-commercial sources, and a complete guidebook is published by the Connecticut Forest and Park Association

Weather along the route is typical of Connecticut. This trail does not really have any exposed ridge tops or summits. Snow is common in the winter and may necessitate the use of snowshoes. Ice can form on exposed ledges and summits, making hiking dangerous without special equipment.

Extensive flooding in ponds, puddles and streams usually occurs in the late winter or early spring, overflowing into the trail and causing very muddy conditions. In this case fairly high waterproof boots are recommended. Since some parts of the trail follow forest roads, ruts and tracks from ATVs and four-wheel drive vehicles make be found.

Biting insects can be bothersome during warm weather. Parasitic deer ticks (which are known to carry Lyme disease) are a potential hazard.

Only the northern trail head and the middle of the trail are close to residential areas. There is one very short paved road walk—along CT-37 and Roads. The northern half of the trail crosses two paved roads.

Some parts of the trail is adjacent to, or are on lands where hunting and the use of firearms are permitted. Wearing bright orange clothing during the hunting season (Fall through December) is recommended.

== Conservation and maintenance of the trail corridor ==
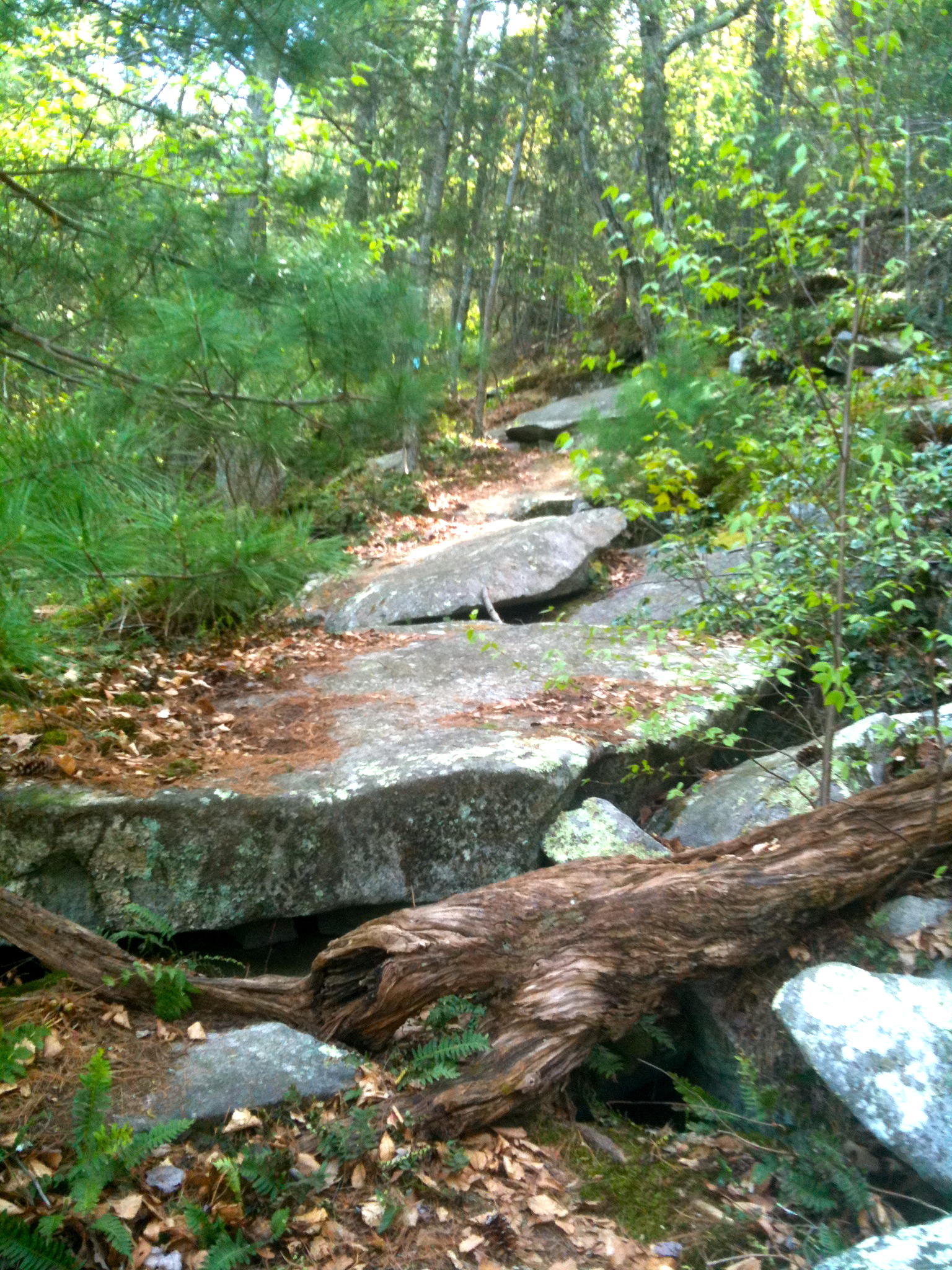
Kelly's Slide and side trail near Candlewood Mountain.

== Recognition and Inspiration Programs ==
The closest state forest letterbox to the Housatonic Range Trail is Pootatuck State Forest.

As of April 2010 the Pootatuck State Forest "Seedling Series" letterbox has been missing although the State of Connecticut's Department of Environmental Protection Forestry Division has said that it will be made available again.

== See also ==
- Blue-Blazed Trails
- Candlewood Lake
- Housatonic River
- Housatonic Valley
- Housatonic Valley Region
- Greater Danbury
- Gaylordsville, Connecticut
- New Milford, Connecticut
