= Howes Cave, New York =

- Hamlet
- Location within New York Location within the United States
- Coordinates: 42°41′24″N 74°22′58″W
- Country: United States
- State: New York
- County: Schoharie
- Elevation: 781 ft (238 m)
- Time zone: UTC-5 (Eastern (EST))
  - Summer (DST): UTC-4 (EDT)
- ZIP code: 12092
- Area codes: 518 & 838
- GNIS feature ID: 974226

Howes Cave is a hamlet in Schoharie County, New York, United States. The community is 5.3 miles (8.5 km) east of Cobleskill. Howes Cave has a post office with ZIP code 12092, which opened on November 18, 1867.

The hamlet's name comes from Howe Caverns, a popular tourist attraction discovered by Lester Howe in 1842. It is also home to Secret Caverns, a tourist attraction similar to Howe Caverns.
