= Black River Escarpment (Ontario) =

The Black River Escarpment is a geological feature in Southeastern Ontario. The escarpment marks the boundary of the older Canadian Shield bedrock and more recent Ordovician limestone. The escarpment runs from Penetanguishene on Georgian Bay to Kingston on Lake Ontario. The cliffs that mark the escarpment, when present, generally average between 5 metres (16 ft) and 15 metres (49 ft) high.

== See also ==
- Niagara Escarpment
- Onondaga Escarpment
- Helderberg Escarpment
