= Tory's Cave (New Milford, Connecticut) =

Cave in Connecticut, United States

Coordinates: 41.61°N 73.46°W

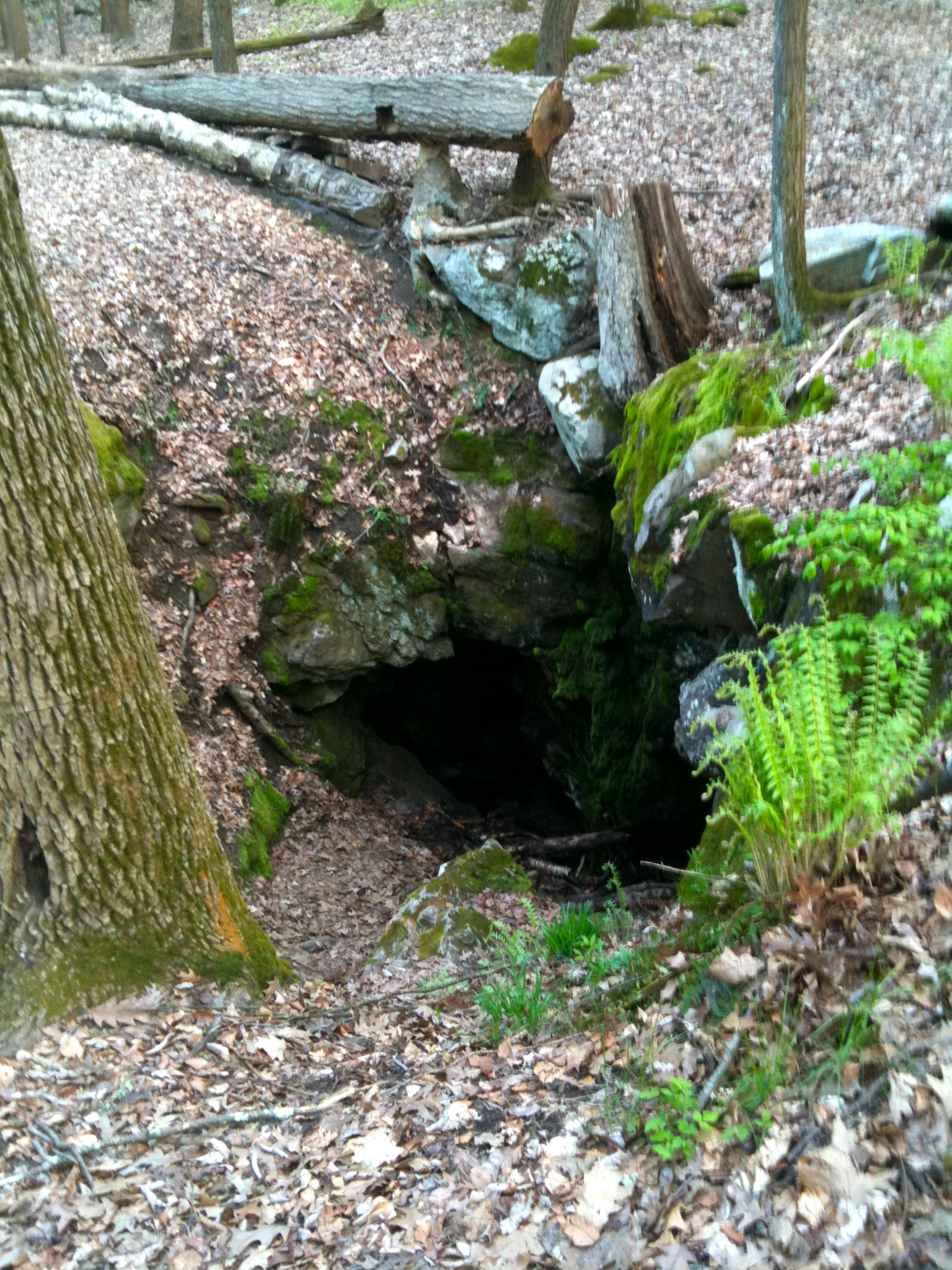
Tory's Cave, on the Housatonic Range Trail, near New Milford, Connecticut.

Tory Cave (or Tory's Cave) is a marble solutional cave near New Milford, Connecticut.

The big room has enough space for two dozen people. To protect bat colonies, the cave is closed to the public. Its name is based on a tale from the American Revolution, in which a Tory (a loyalist to the English monarchy) hid in the cave. The cave is near the Housatonic River.

In 1996, Joe Hurley, writing in the Record Journal, reported that the cave's unique ecology was threatened by blasting from a nearby quarry. The cave is home to a blind shrimp-like amphipod called a Stygobromus.

== See also ==
- Connecticut trips: what, when, where
