= Helderberg Escarpment =

Mountain in New York, United States

- Approximate location of the Helderberg Escarpement in New York

Highest point
- Elevation: 1,197 feet (365 m)

Geography
- Location: SSE of Altamont, New York, U.S.
- Topo map(s): USGS Westerlo, Clarksville, Voorheesville, Alcove, Altamont

The Helderberg Escarpment, also known as the Helderberg Mountains, is an escarpment in eastern New York, United States, roughly 11 miles (18 km) west of the city of Albany. The escarpment is the northeastern extremity of the Allegheny Plateau. It rises steeply from the Hudson Valley below, with an elevation difference of approximately 700 feet (from 400 to 1,100 feet) over a horizontal distance of approximately 2,000 feet. Much of the escarpment is within John Boyd Thacher State Park, and has views of the Hudson Valley and the Capital District.

== Geology ==
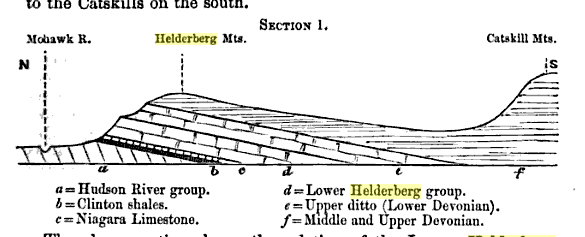
Cross-section of the Helderberg Ridge.

The escarpment is part of the Onondaga Escarpment and is geologically related to the Niagara Escarpment, and the Black River Escarpment. The rocks exposed in the escarpment date back to the Middle Ordovician to Early Devonian.

In 1934 the Schenectady Gazette described how the Tory Cave, one of the limestone caves to be found in the escarpment, routinely had stalagmites of ice in the springtime.

== Transmission towers ==
This site has been in use as a TV/FM tower location longer than any other such multi-tower site in the country, going all the way back to General Electric’s early TV work here in the late 1930s with WRGB and several early independent FM stations (W47A/WBCA and WFLY) by the mid-1940s. Most of the Capital District's television and FM radio stations installed their transmission towers at the escarpment to take advantage of its high ground. In 2003 a 499-foot (152 m) tower was built on the highest point of the escarpment, for transmitting digital television and FM radio signals.

== History ==
Dutch settlers first homesteaded the plateau above the escarpment in the 17th century. Helleberg is a Dutch name meaning "clear mountain".

The Open Space Institute and the Mohawk Hudson Land Conservancy are working to keep escarpment lands from being developed for housing or industrial uses. Farmers farming land near the escarpment can apply to sell their development rights, to help make sure that land is not developed. In 2003 the Ten Eyck family, owners of the Indian Ladder Farm just below the escarpment, sold the development rights to their farm for $848,000. Two real estate assessment were done, one on the value of the property as a working farm, the other on its value as a potential site for urban development. The Ten Eycks were paid the difference in return for agreeing to keep the property as a working farm. They were the first property owners to sell their development rights in Albany County.

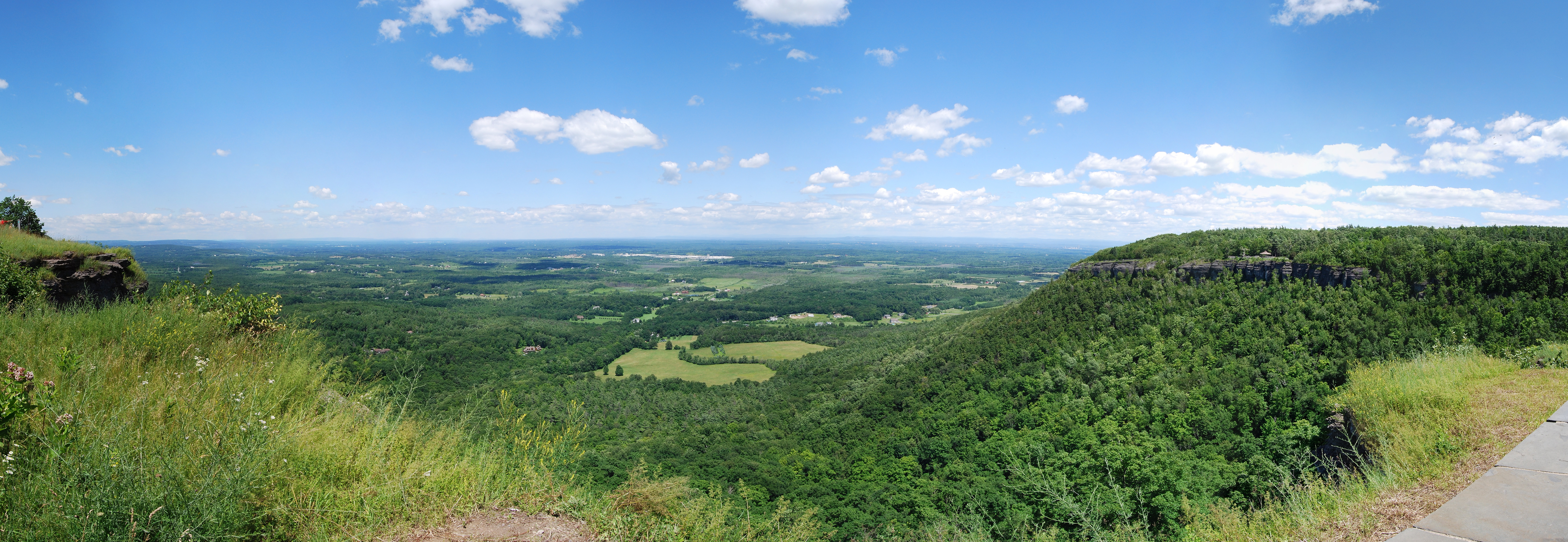
An edge of the Helderberg Escarpment, visible to the right
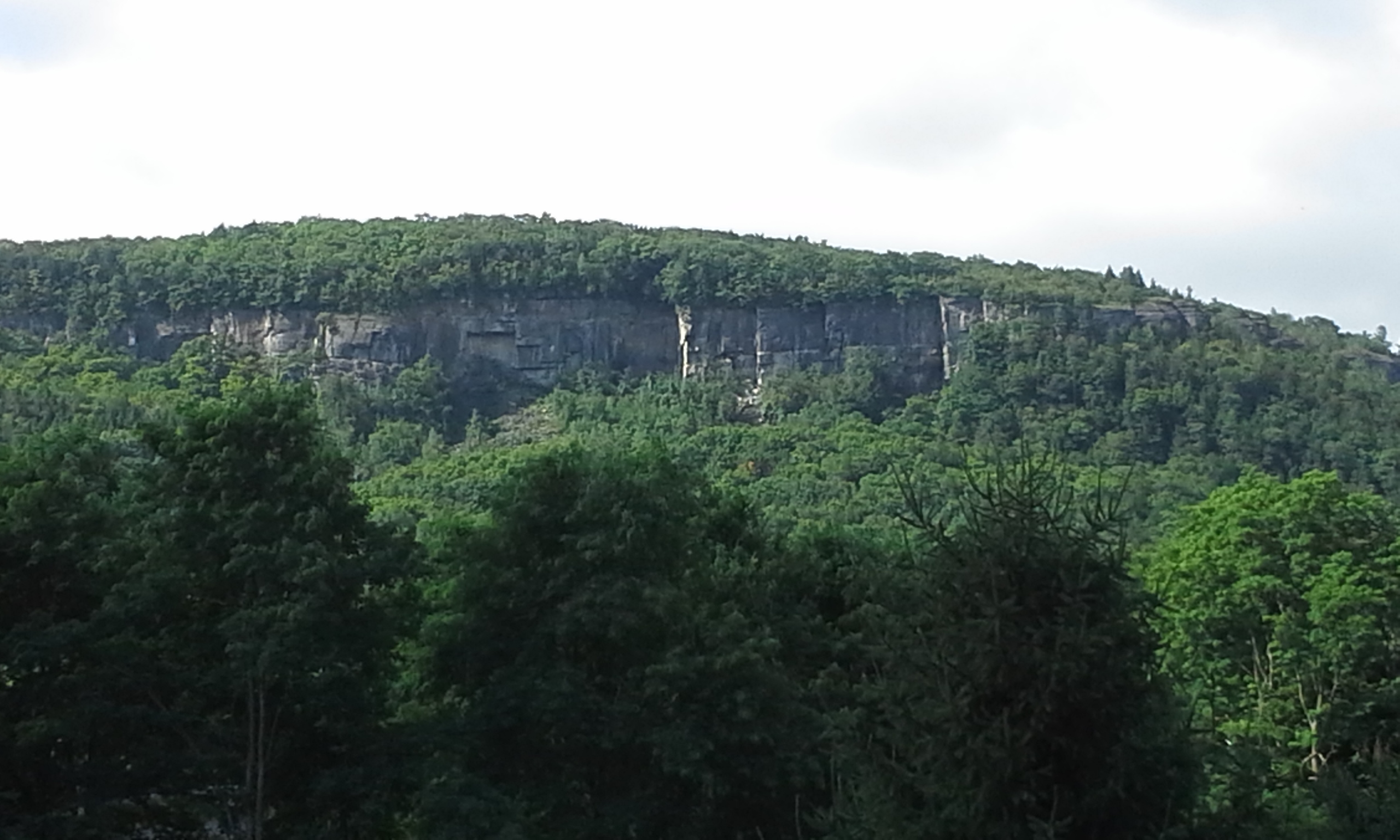
The Helderberg Escarpment, as seen from below

== See also ==
- List of escarpments
