= Glaciokarst =

Karst landscape that was glaciated during the cold periods of the Pleistocene

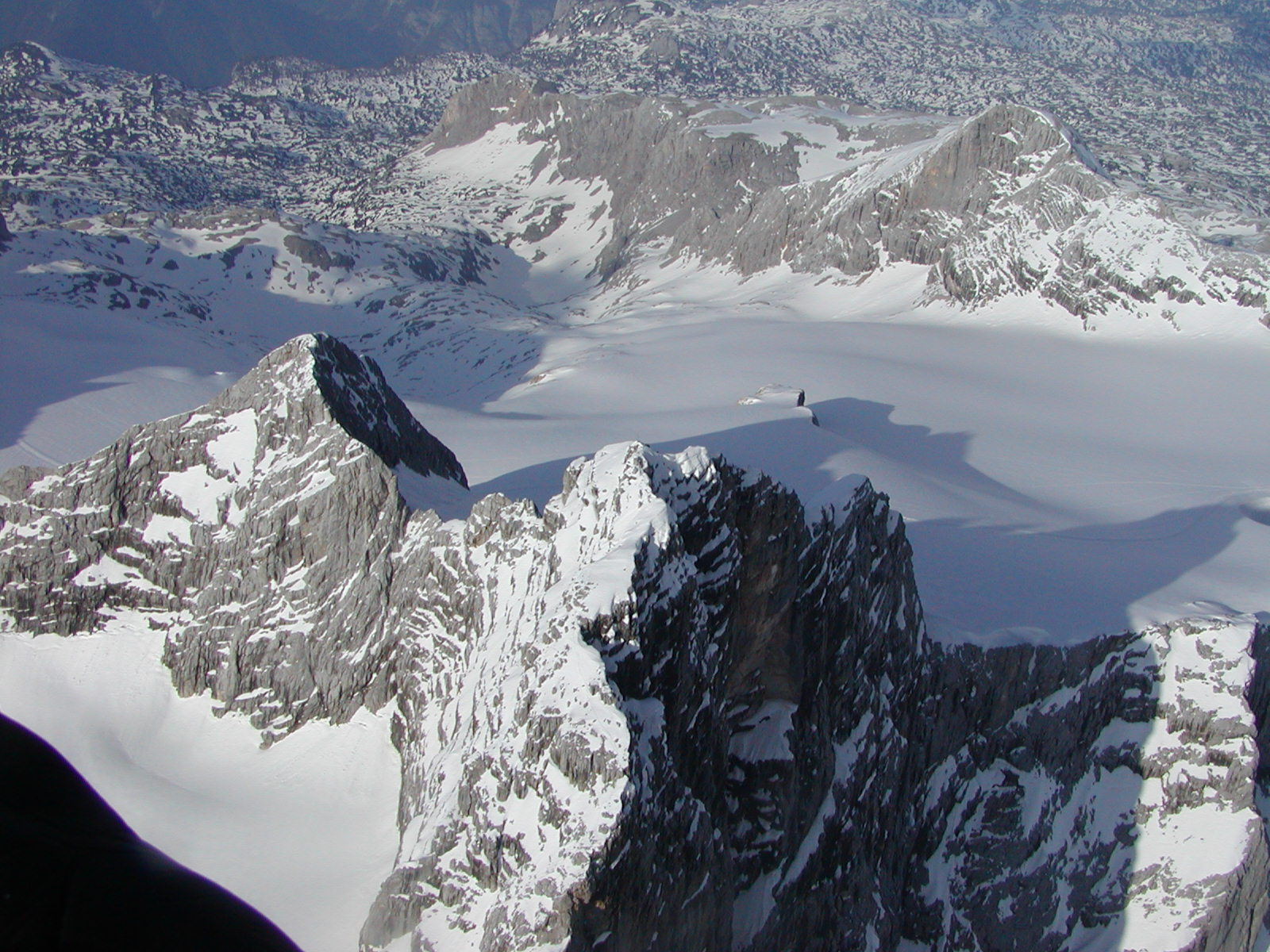
Example of a Glaciokarst are the Dachstein Mountains which are a typical Alpine glaciokarst in the Eastern Alps.

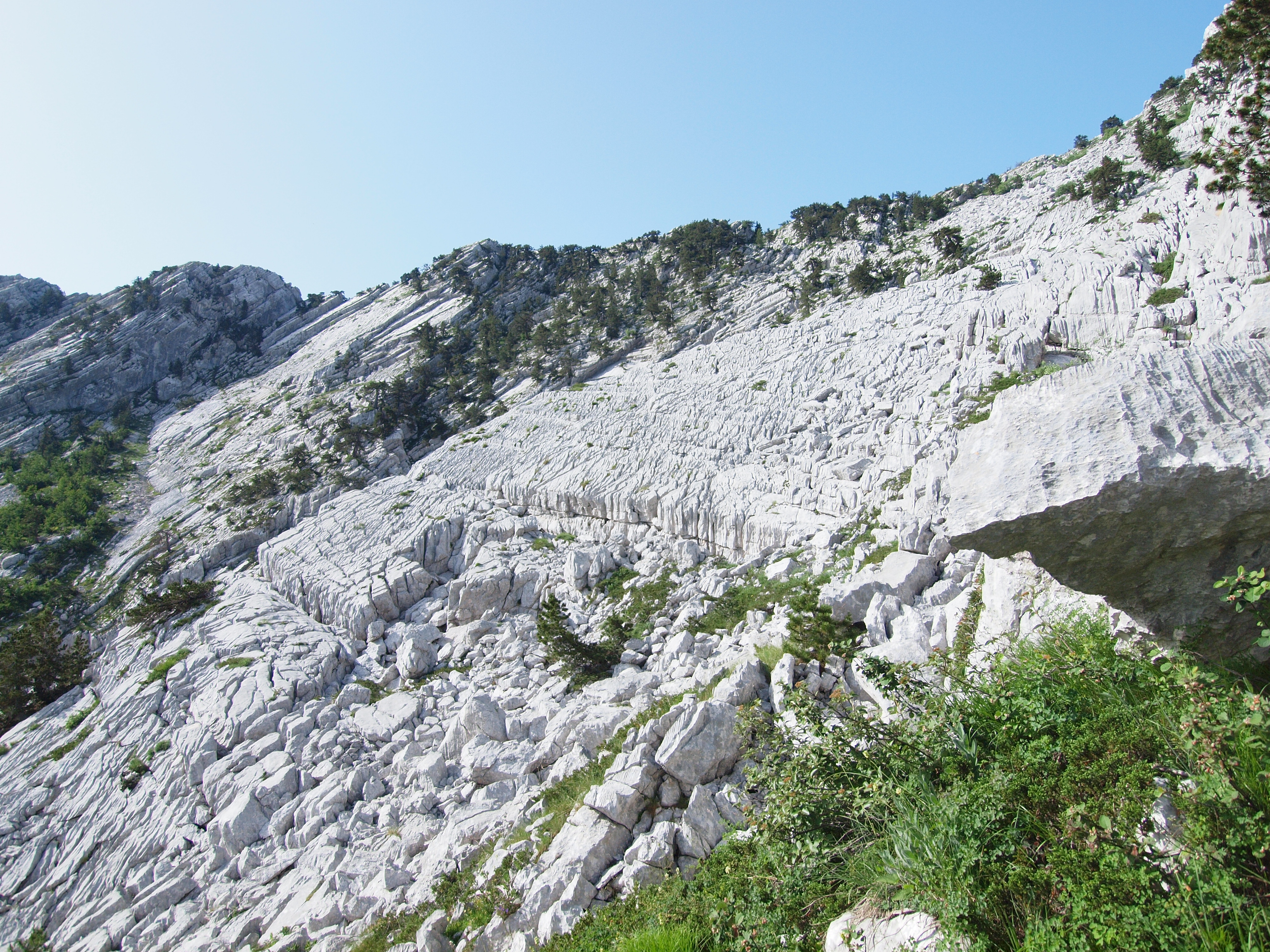
Glaciokarst features at Reovačka greda, Mount Orjen

Glaciokarst is a geological term that refers to a specific type of karst landscape that has been influenced significantly by past glacial activity.

Karst landscapes consist of distinctive surface and subsurface landforms. These landforms are a result of the dissolution of soluble rocks like limestone, gypsum or dolomite by water. In the case of glaciokarst, the karst landscape has been shaped by the action of glaciers resulting in glacial erosion, deposition or other processes that directly impact the soluble rocks in the area. Examples of glaciokarst landscapes are found in the Western Alps or the Eastern Alps such as Tennengebirge, Dachstein Mountains and the Altai Mountains.

== Formation of glaciokarst ==
Glaciokarst landscapes form through interactions between ice and certain types of rock, like limestone, gypsum, or dolomite, that are able to dissolve in water. When glaciers move over the land, they shape it by carving valleys and other glacial features. As it acquires carbon dioxide, meltwater from these glaciers forms a weak acid that can dissolve these specific rocks, eventually leading to cave formation. Over time, the combination of glacial sculpting and rock dissolution produces distinct landforms such as sinkholes and caves within the regions affected by glaciers.

Velež Mountain provides an example of glaciokarst where karstic terrain has been significantly affected by glacial processes during the Pleistocene epoch. This landscape includes valley glaciers and a plateau glacier, primarily located on the northern slopes. The northern slopes exhibit features shaped by glacial erosion, presenting cirques, pavements, and roche moutonnées covered with small-scale karst features while in the lower regions of the Velež Mountain, significant moraine ridges, lateral moraines, breach-lobe moraines, and smaller recessional moraines formed, varying in their composition and height. The absence of valley discharge and the presence of indicators of glacial erosion hint at a pattern of vertical drainage of sub-glacial waters into the karst landscape. The outwash fans that filled some hollow areas displayed a change in the kind of sediment they contained, from rough near the ice margin to finer material further away.

== Characteristics of glaciokarst ==
Glaciokarst landscapes have an array of unique features resulting from the fusion of glacial and karstic processes. Typical features found in glaciokarst landscapes may include glacially carved valleys, sinkholes formed by the dissolution of bedrock, and ice-contact features. Glaciokarsts encompass various classifications based on multiple criteria. These classifications include distinctions regarding the presence of meltwater, the types of karstic rocks involved, proximity to the Equator, the relationship between glaciers and karst formations, the geographical location of the glaciokarsts, and the rate of glaciation. Glaciokarsts are predominantly composed of limestone but can also form on marble, dolomite, and gypsum. Structurally, they are categorized into Alpine or continental types, and geosyncline or tabular types. They can exist in marine or terrestrial environments, each with varying levels of precipitation and ice cover impacting the karst formations. The interaction between the processes of glaciation and karstification can create intriguing geological formations and landscapes.
