= Tory Cave (Albany, New York) =

Cave in New York, United States

Coordinates: 42°39.328′N 74°1.012′W

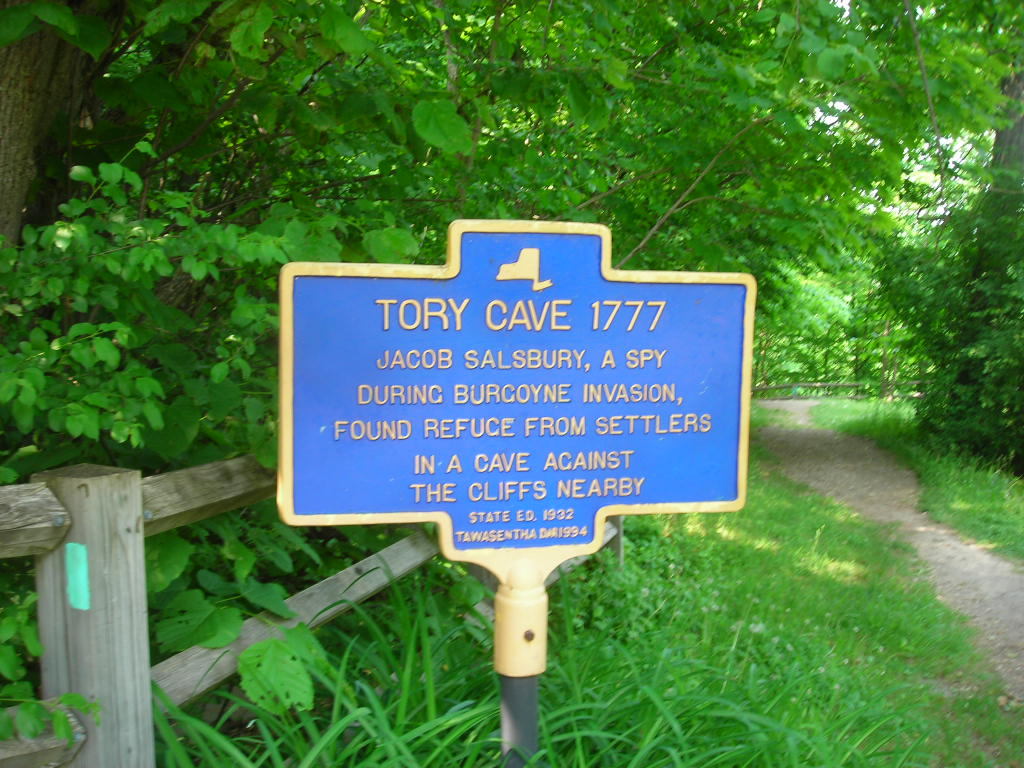
The cave is a local tourist attraction.

The Tory Cave is a limestone cave in the Helderberg Escarpment geologic formation. Its name is based on a story from the American Revolution, where a Tory — a loyalist to the English monarchy — hid in the cave. According to some accounts Jacob Salsbury was a loyalist who reported to the British on rebel troop movements.

The cave is near the top of the escarpment.

Visually interesting ice stalagmites can be found in the cave, in springtime. There are other caves in the region that do not develop stalagmites. According to Jim Gould, the author of Rooted in Rock, a partial rock fall blocks drafts that would have prevented the growth of large stalagmites.
