= History of Turkey (disambiguation) =

The History of Turkey is the history of lands called Turkey after Turkish migration.

The History of Turkey may also refer to:

- Seljuk Turks (1000–1300) Sultanate of Rûm
- Anatolian beyliks (11th-17th centuries)
- Ottoman Empire (1299–1922)
- History of the Republic of Turkey (since 1923)
- History of Anatolia
  - Names of Anatolia
- Turkey (bird)#History and naming
