= Manius Aquillius =

Manius Aquillius may refer to:

- Manius Aquillius (consul 129 BC), Roman consul in 129 BC
- Manius Aquillius (consul 101 BC) (died 88 BC), possibly son of the previous, Roman consul in 101 BC
