= History of Anatolia =

Aspect of world history

The history of Anatolia (often referred to in historical sources as Asia Minor) can be roughly subdivided into: Prehistory of Anatolia (up to the end of the 3rd millennium BCE), Ancient Anatolia (including Hattian, Hittite and post-Hittite periods), Classical Anatolia (including Achaemenid, Hellenistic and Roman periods), Byzantine Anatolia (later overlapping, since the 11th century, with the gradual Seljuk and Ottoman conquest), Ottoman Anatolia (14th–20th centuries) and the Modern Anatolia, since the creation of the Republic of Turkey.

== Prehistory ==
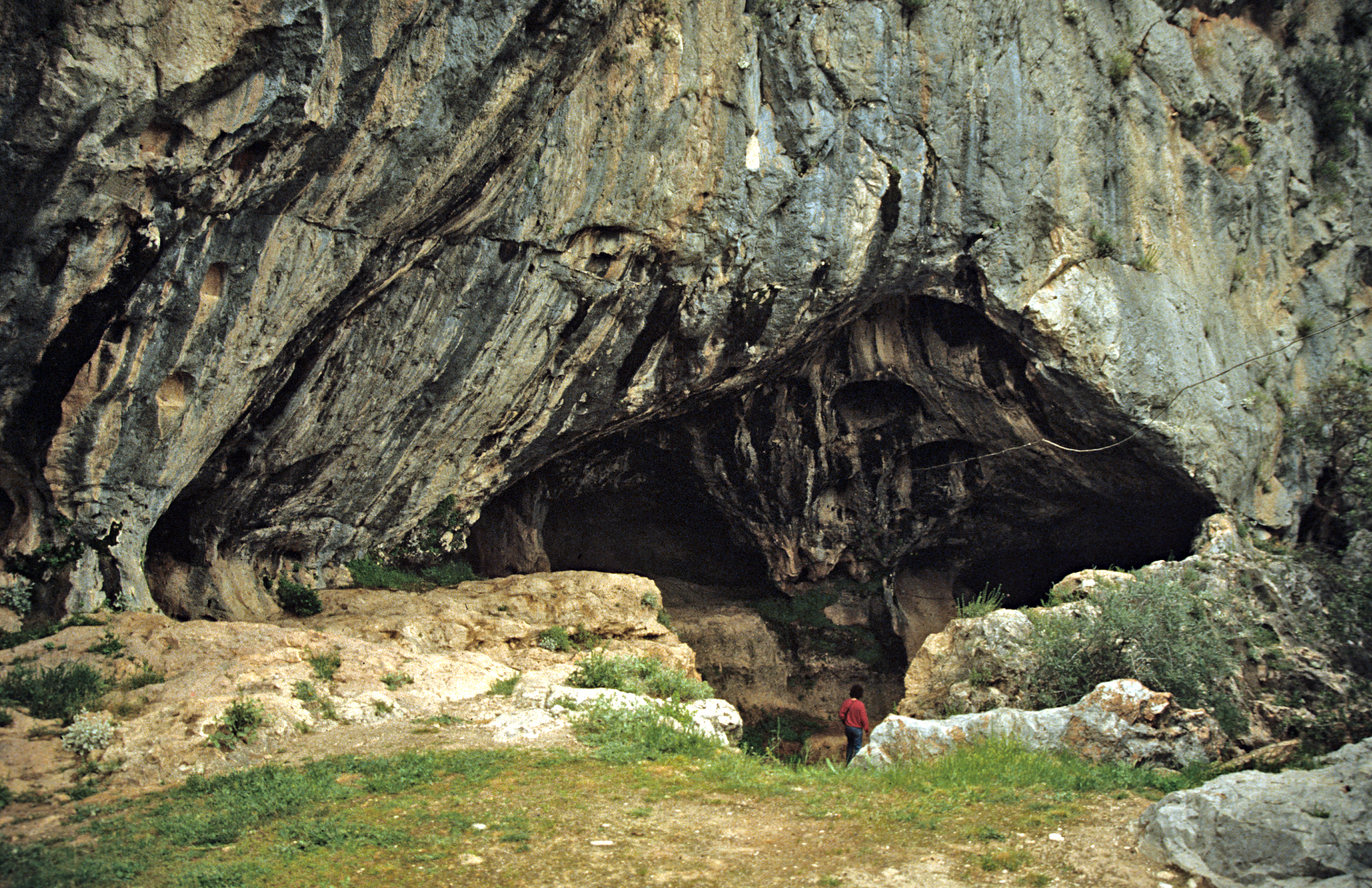
Karain Cave is a Paleolithic archaeological site located at Yağca village 27 km northwest of Antalya city in the Mediterranean region of Turkey

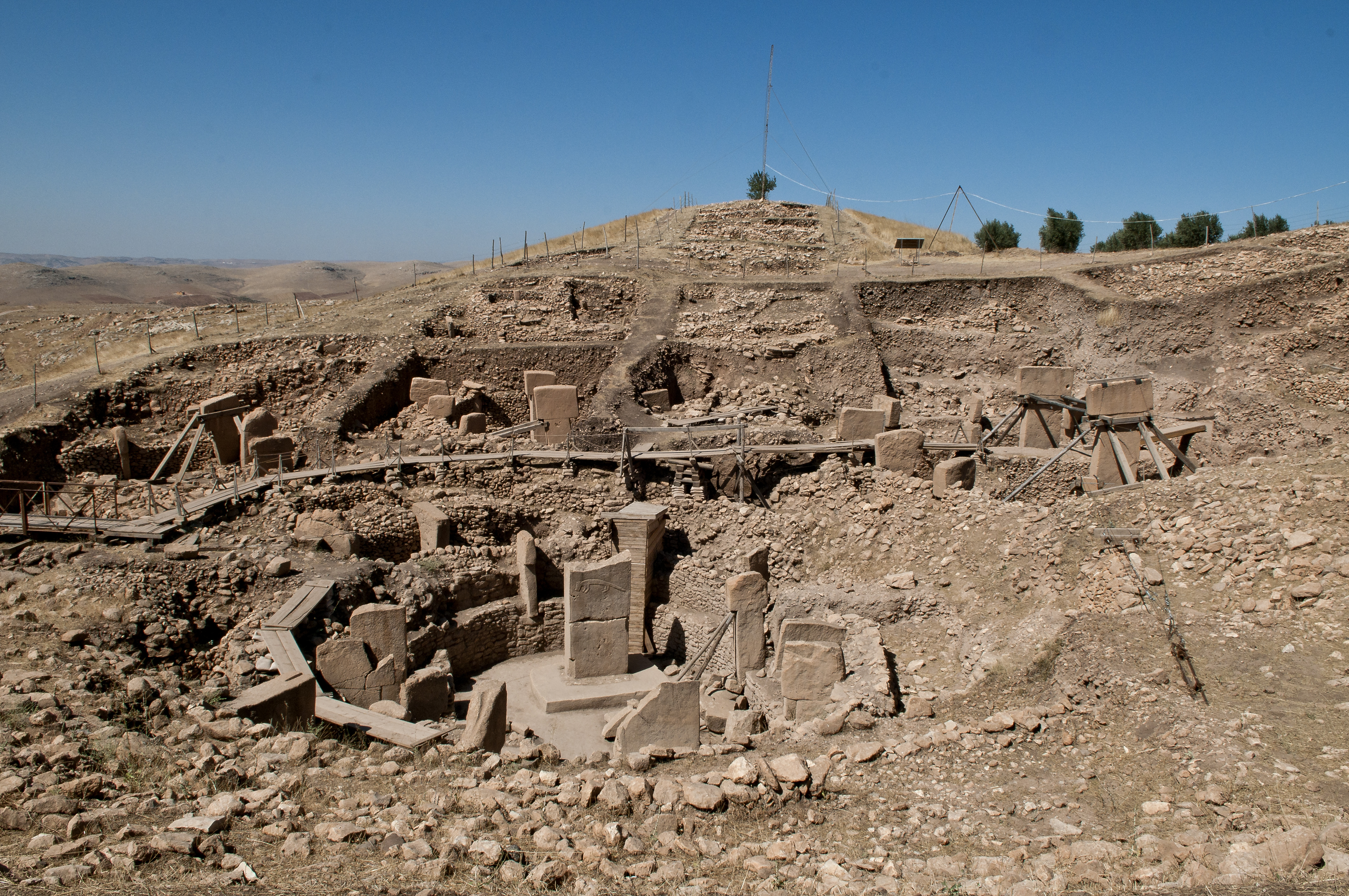
Göbekli Tepe, Şanlıurfa.

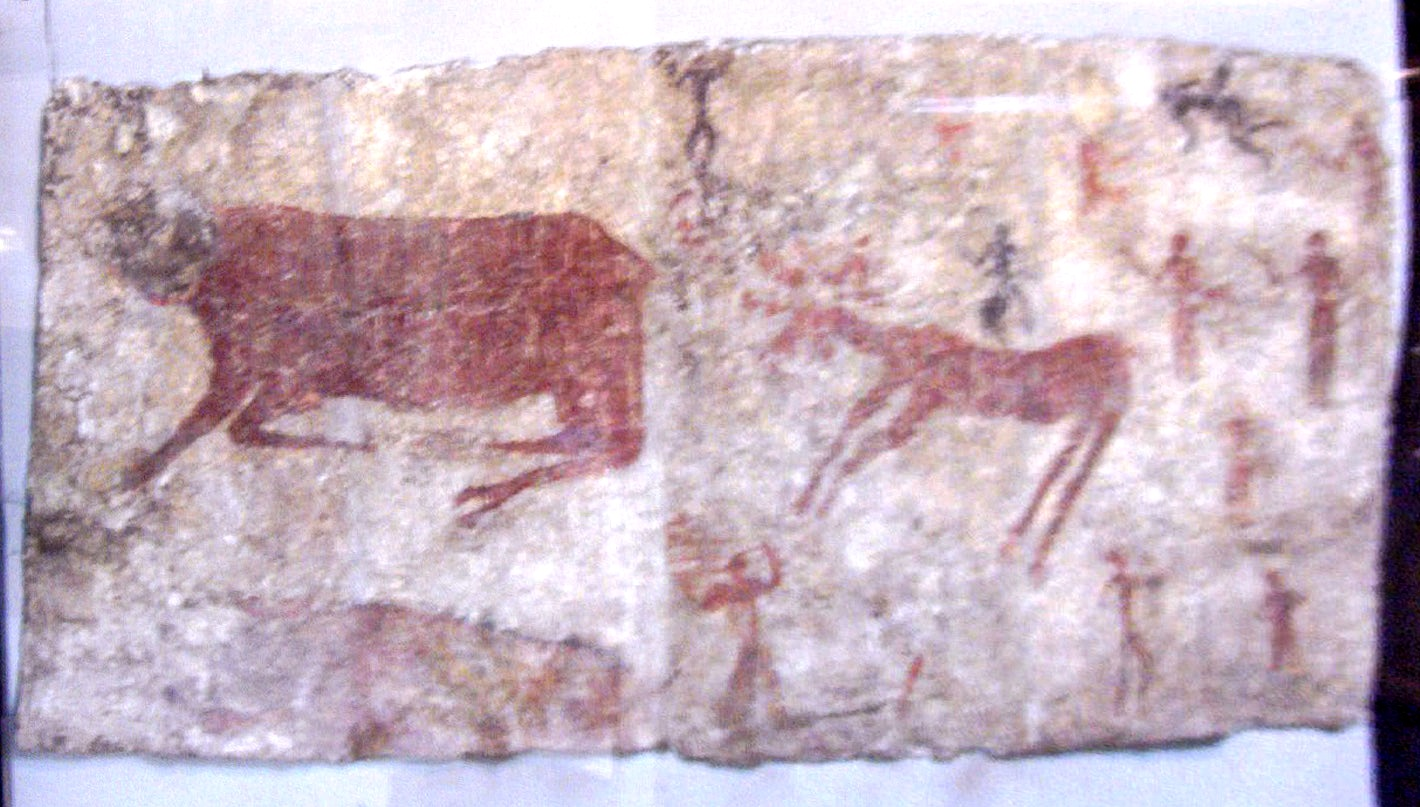
Wall painting of a bull, deer and man from Çatalhöyük; 6th millennium BCE; reconstruction in their original positions of the bull's heads and the human relief-figure; Museum of Anatolian Civilizations, Ankara.

Prehistory of Anatolia encompasses the entire prehistoric period, from the earliest archeological records of human presence in Anatolia, to the advent of historical era, marked by the appearance of literacy and historical sources related to the territory of Anatolia (c. 2000 BCE). In 2014, a stone tool was found in the Gediz River that was dated with certainty to 1.2 million years ago. The 27,000-year-old Homo sapiens footprints of Kula and Karain Cave are samples for human existence in Anatolia, in this period. Because of its strategic location at the intersection of Asia and Europe, Anatolia has been the center of several civilizations since prehistoric times. Neolithic settlements include Çatalhöyük, Çayönü, Nevalı Çori, Hacılar, Göbekli Tepe, and Mersin.

== Ancient Anatolia ==
=== Early Bronze Age ===
Bronze metallurgy spread to Anatolia from the Transcaucasian Kura-Araxes culture in the late 4th millennium BCE, marking the beginning of the Bronze Age in the region. Anatolia remained in the prehistoric period until it entered the sphere of influence of the Akkadian Empire in the 24th century BCE under Sargon. The oldest recorded name for any region within Anatolia is related to its central areas, known as the "Land of Hatti". That designation that was initially used for the land of ancient Hattians, but later became the most common name for the entire territory under the rule of ancient Hittites. The interest of Akkad in the region as far as it is known was for exporting various materials for manufacturing. While Anatolia was well endowed with copper ores, there is no trace as yet of substantial workings of the tin required to make bronze in Bronze-Age Anatolia. Akkad suffered problematic climate changes in Mesopotamia, as well as a reduction in available manpower that affected trade. This led to the fall of the Akkadians around 2150 BCE at the hands of the Gutians.

=== Middle Bronze Age ===
The Old Assyrian Empire claimed the resources for themselves after the Gutians were vanquished, notably silver. One of the numerous Assyrian cuneiform records found in Anatolia at Kanesh uses an advanced system of trading computations and credit lines.

The Hittite Old Kingdom emerges towards the close of the Middle Bronze Age, conquering Hattusa under Hattusili I (17th century BCE).

The Anatolian Middle Bronze Age influenced the Minoan culture on Crete as evidenced by archaeological recovery at Knossos.

=== Late Bronze Age ===
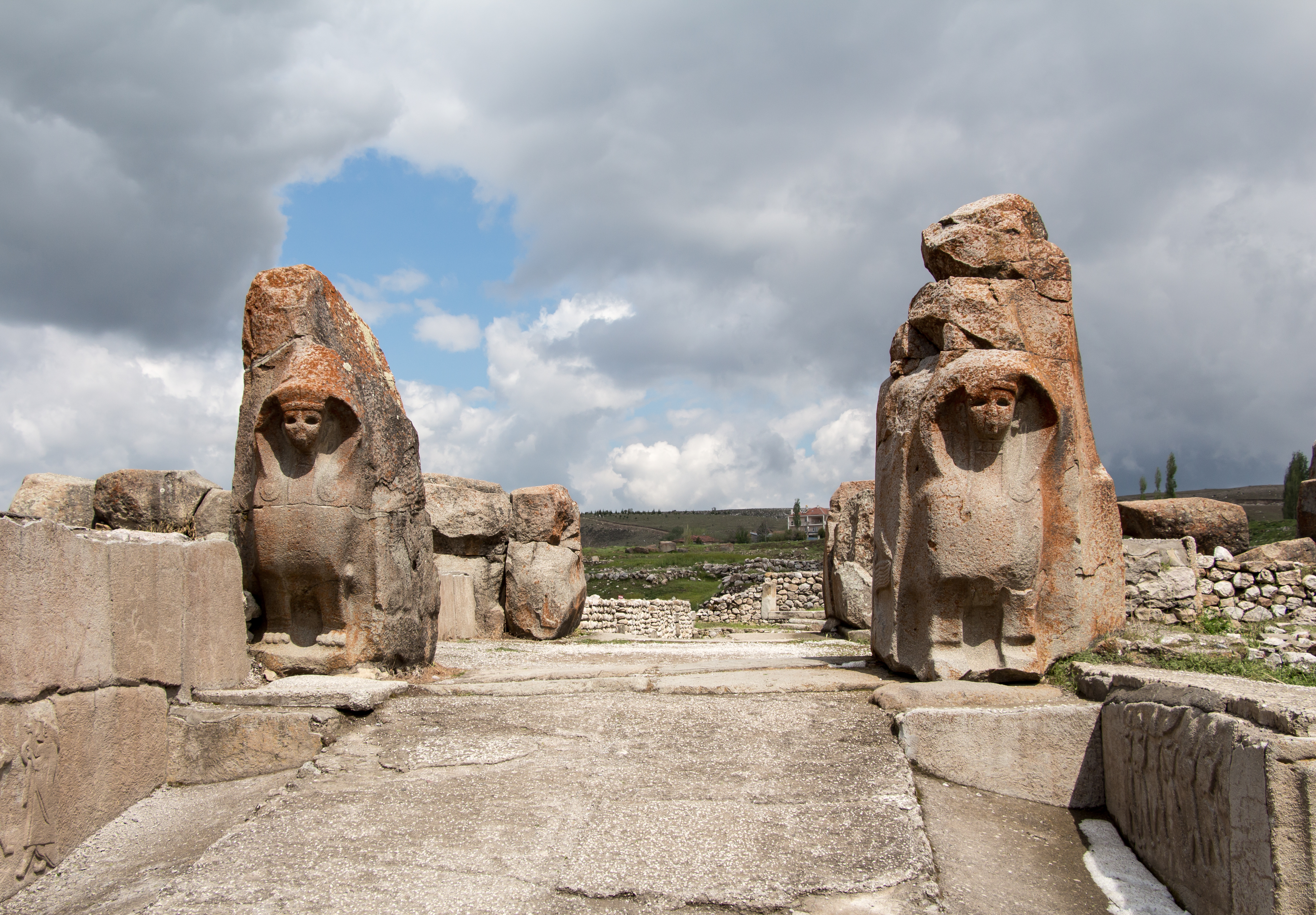
The Sphinx Gate (Alaca Höyük, Turkey)

The Hittite Empire was at its height in the 14th century BCE, encompassing central Anatolia, north-western Syria as far as Ugarit, and upper Mesopotamia. Kizzuwatna in southern Anatolia controlled the region separating Hatti from Syria, thereby greatly affecting trade routes. The peace was kept in accordance with both empires through treaties that established boundaries of control. It was not until the reign of the Hittite king Šuppiluliuma II that Kizzuwatna was fully taken over, and the Hittites still preserved their cultural accomplishments in Kummanni (now Şar, Turkey) and Lazawantiya, north of Cilicia.

After the 1180s BCE, amid general turmoil in the Levant associated with the sudden arrival of the Sea Peoples, the empire disintegrated into several independent "Neo-Hittite" city-states, some of which survived until as late as the 8th century BCE. The history of the Hittite civilization is known mostly from cuneiform texts found in the area of their empire, and from diplomatic and commercial correspondence found in various archives in Egypt and the Middle East.

=== Iron Age ===
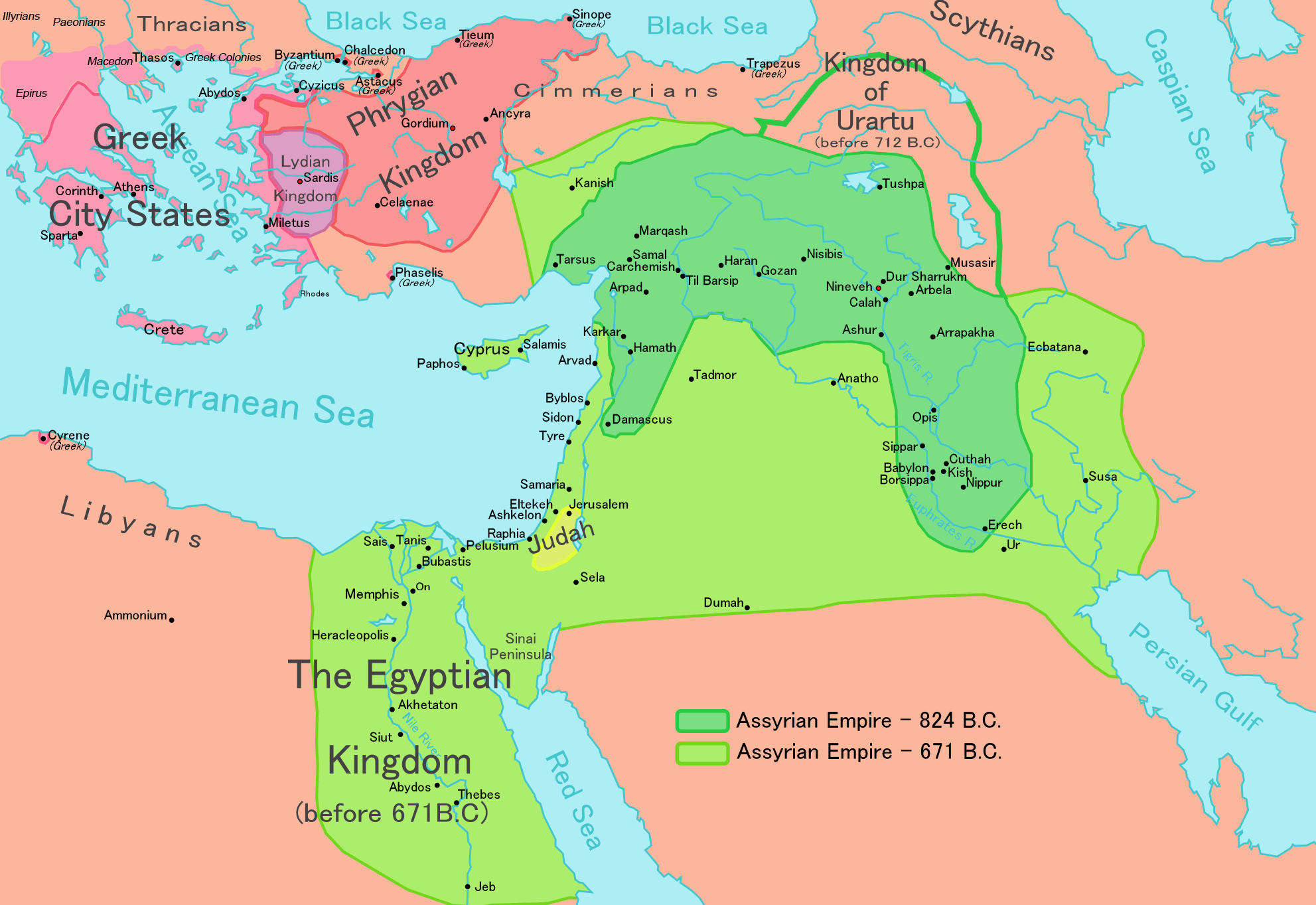
Phrygia at the height of its power and Assyria, 9th–7th century BCE.

Before 1200 BC, there were four Greek-speaking settlements in Anatolia, including Miletus. Around 1200–1000 BC, Greeks started migrating to the west coast of Anatolia.

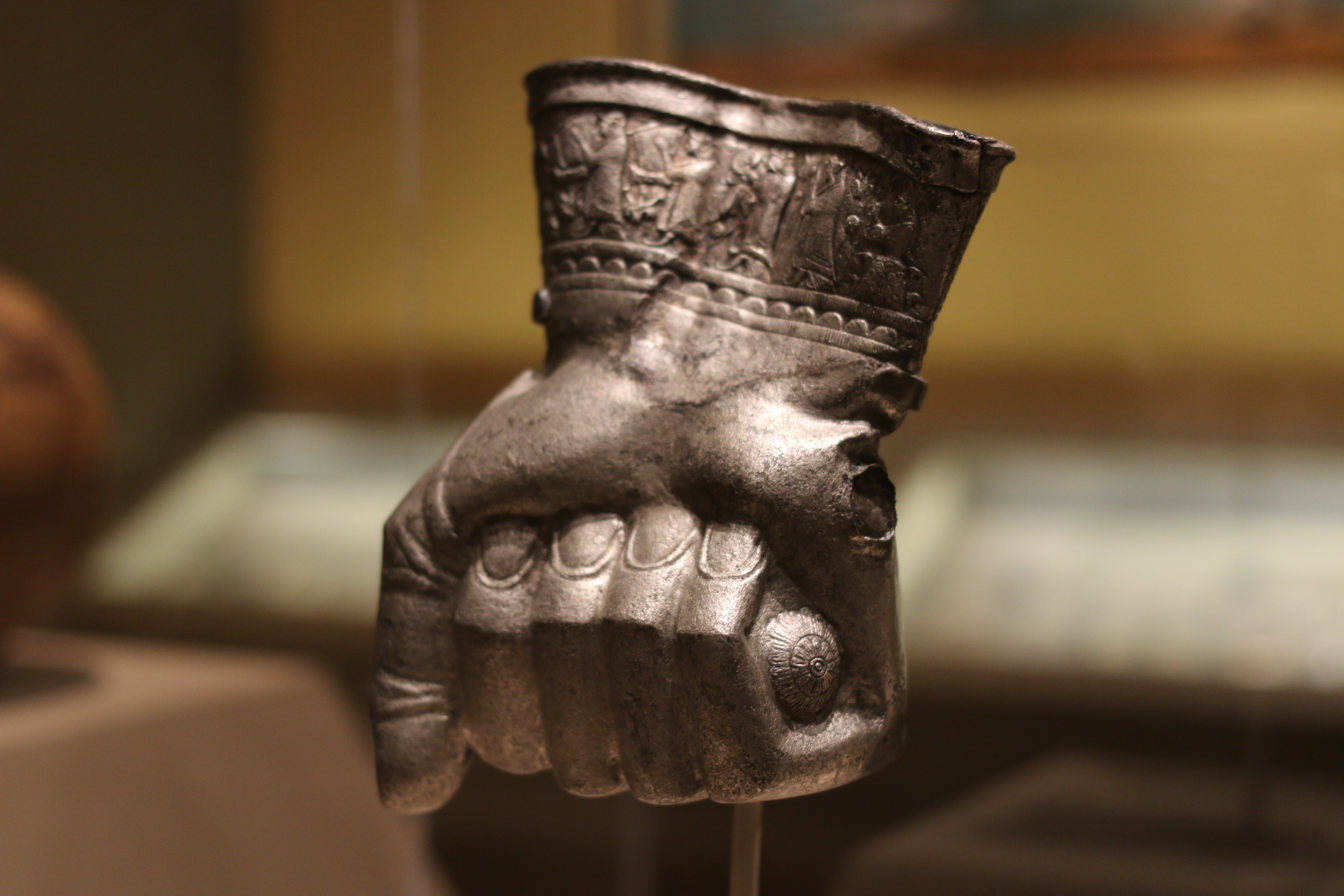
Hittite drinking cup in the shape of a fist; 1400–1380 BCE.

The Phrygian Kingdom essentially came into being after the fragmentation of the Hittite Empire during the 12th century BCE, and existed independently until the 7th century BCE. Possibly from the region of Thrace, the Phrygians eventually established their capital of Gordium (now in Yassıhüyük, Polatlı). Known as Mushki by the Assyrians, the Phrygian people lacked central control in their style of government, and yet established an extensive network of roads. They also held tightly onto a lot of the Hittite facets of culture and adapted them over time.

Shrouded in myth and legend promulgated by ancient Greek and Roman writers is King Midas, the last king of the Phrygian Kingdom. The mythology of Midas revolves around his ability to turn objects to gold by mere touch, as granted by Dionysos, and his unfortunate encounter with Apollo from which his ears are turned into the ears of a donkey. The historical record of Midas shows that he lived approximately between 740 and 696 BCE, and represented Phrygia as a great king. Most historians now consider him to be King Mita of the Mushkis as noted in Assyrian accounts. The Assyrians thought of Mita as a dangerous foe, for Sargon II, their ruler at the time, was quite happy to negotiate a peace treaty in 709 BCE. This treaty had no effect on the advancing Cimmerians, who streamed into Phrygia and led to the downfall and suicide of King Midas in 696 BCE.

=== Maeonia and the Lydian Kingdom ===
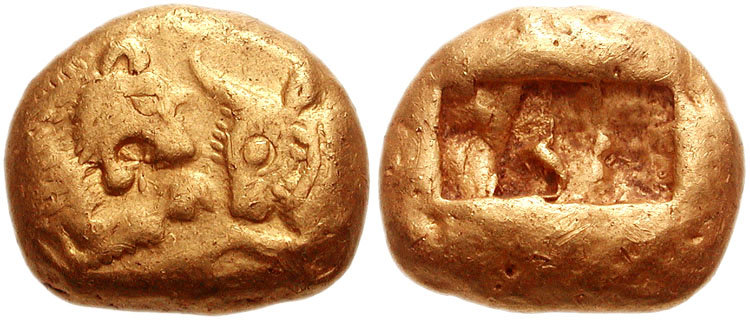
Silver Croeseid, minted by King Croesus, circa 560–546 BCE in Lydia. The gold and silver Croeseids formed the world's first bimetallic monetary system c. 550 BCE.

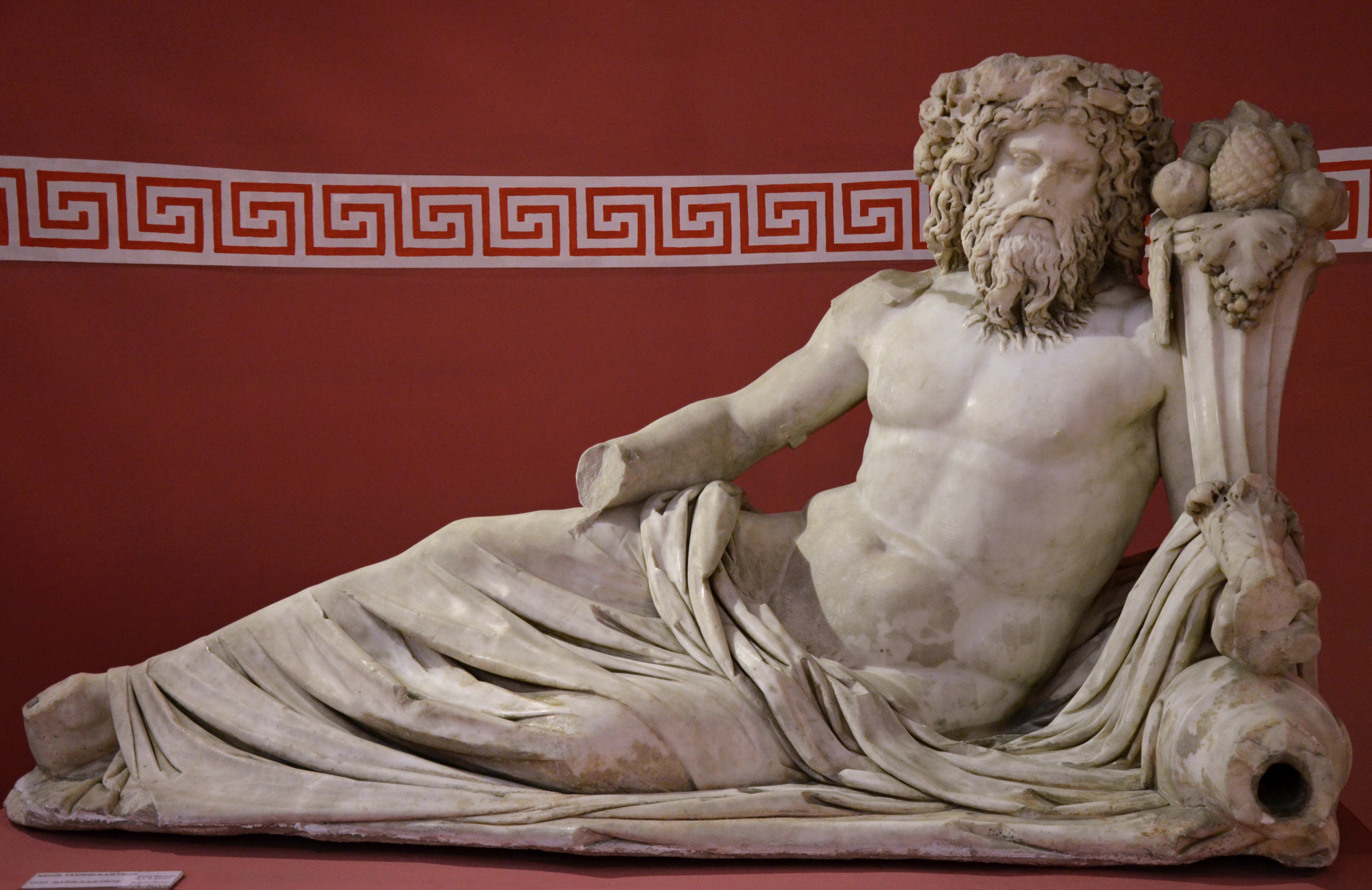
The statue of the river god Kaystros with a cornucopia in İzmir Museum of History and Art at Kültürpark, İzmir.

Lydia, or Maeonia as it was called before 687 BCE, was a major part of the history of western Anatolia, beginning with the Atyad dynasty, who first appeared around 1300 BCE. The succeeding dynasty, the Heraclids, managed to rule successively from 1185 to 687 BCE despite a growing presence of Greek influences along the Mediterranean coast. As Greek cities such as Smyrna, Colophon, and Ephesus rose, the Heraclids became weaker and weaker. The last king, Candaules, was murdered by his friend and lance-bearer named Gyges, and he took over as ruler. Gyges waged war against the intruding Greeks, and soon faced by a grave problem as the Cimmerians began to pillage outlying cities within the kingdom. It was this wave of attacks that led to the incorporation of the formerly independent Phrygia and its capital Gordium into the Lydian domain. It was until the successive rules of Sadyattes and Alyattes, ending in 560 BCE, that the attacks of the Cimmerians ended for good. Under the reign of the last Lydian king Croesus, Persia was invaded first at the Battle of Pteria ending without a victor. Progressing deeper into Persia, Croesus was thoroughly defeated in the Battle of Thymbra at the hands of the Persian Cyrus II in 546 BCE.

== Classical Anatolia ==
=== Achaemenid Empire ===
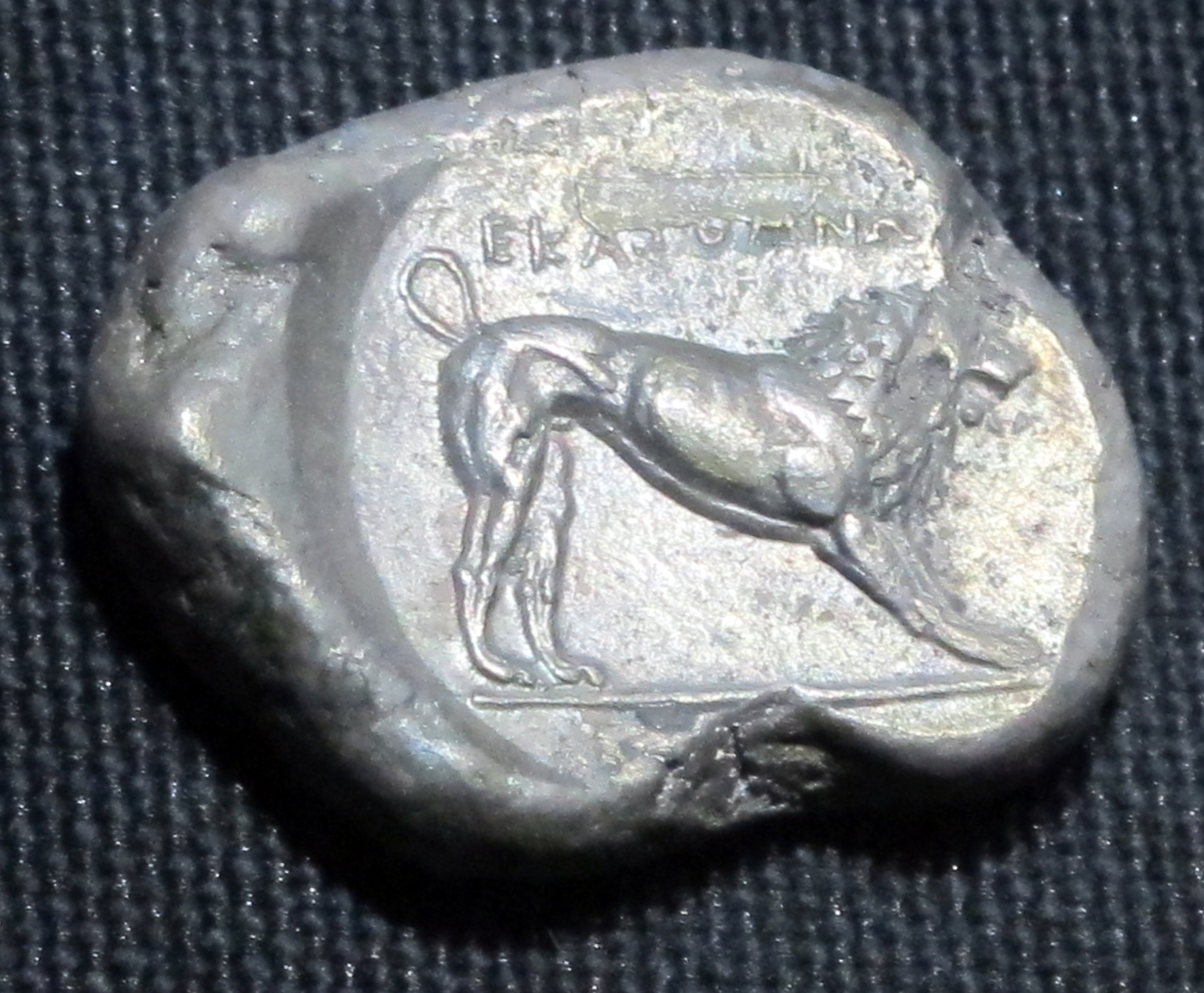
Hecatomnus coin, Bodrum Museum of Underwater Archaeology, Bodrum, Turkey.

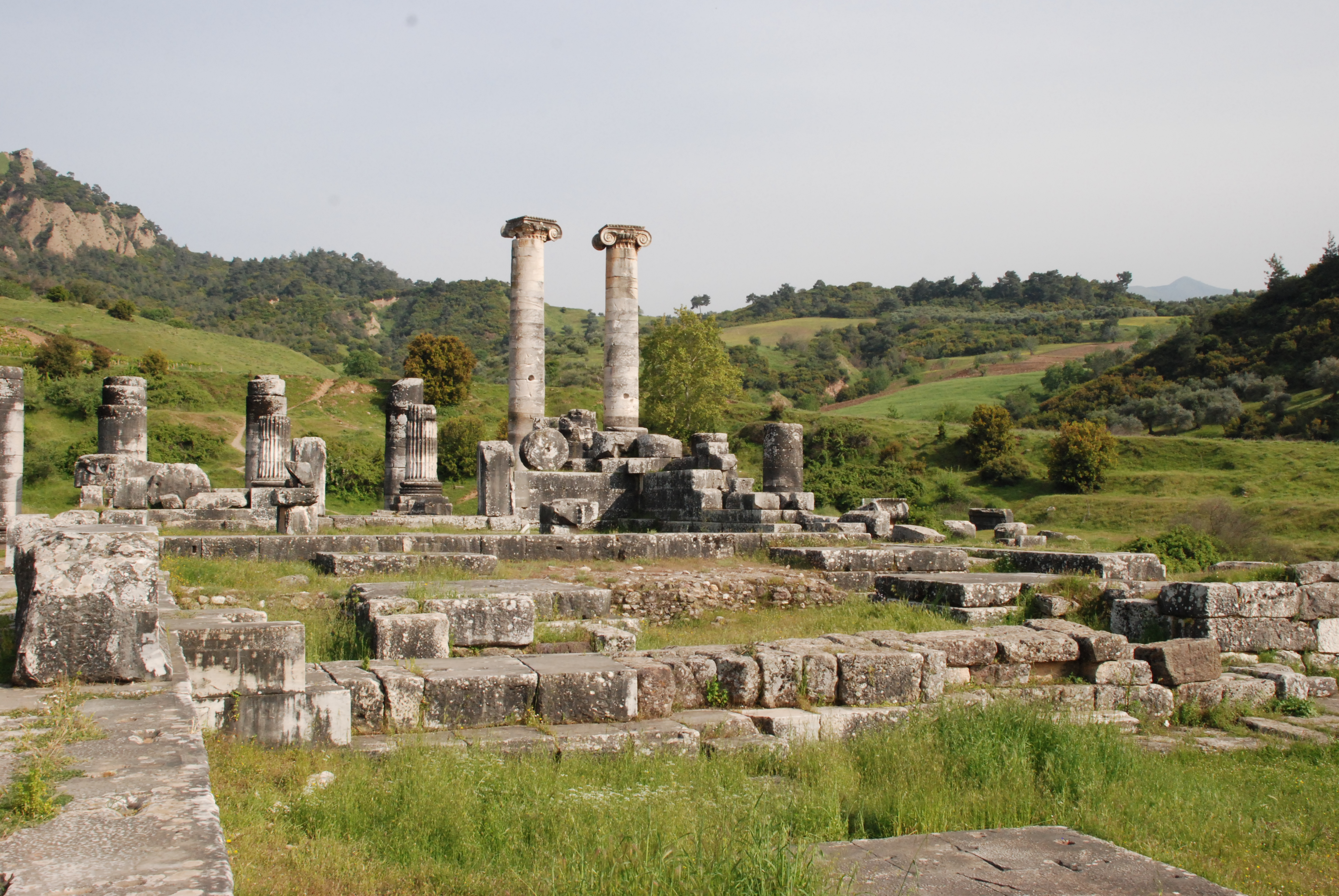
The archaeological site of Sardis, today known as Sart in Turkey.

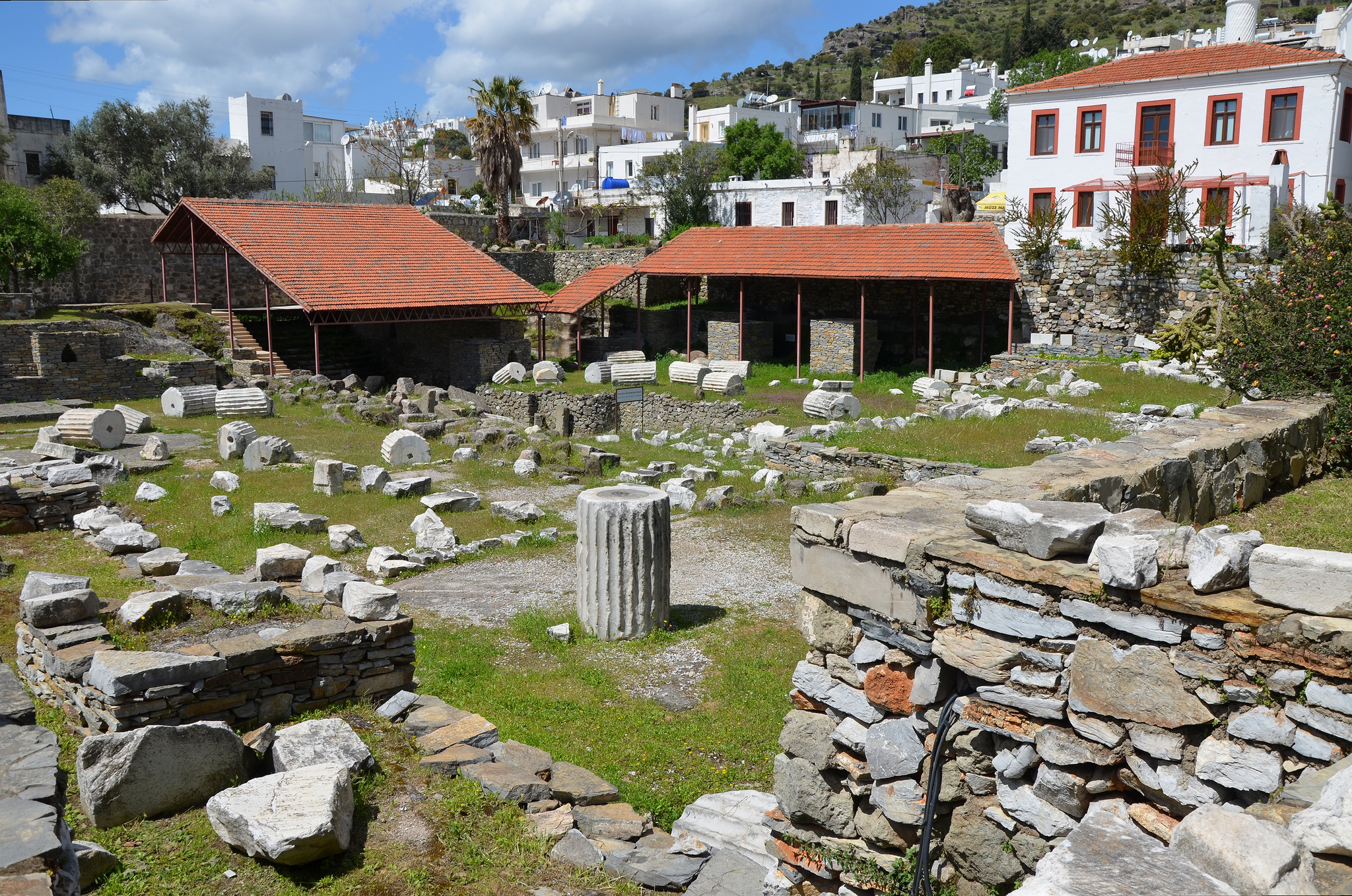
The ruins of the Mausoleum at Halicarnassus in Bodrum, one of the Seven Wonders of the Ancient World.

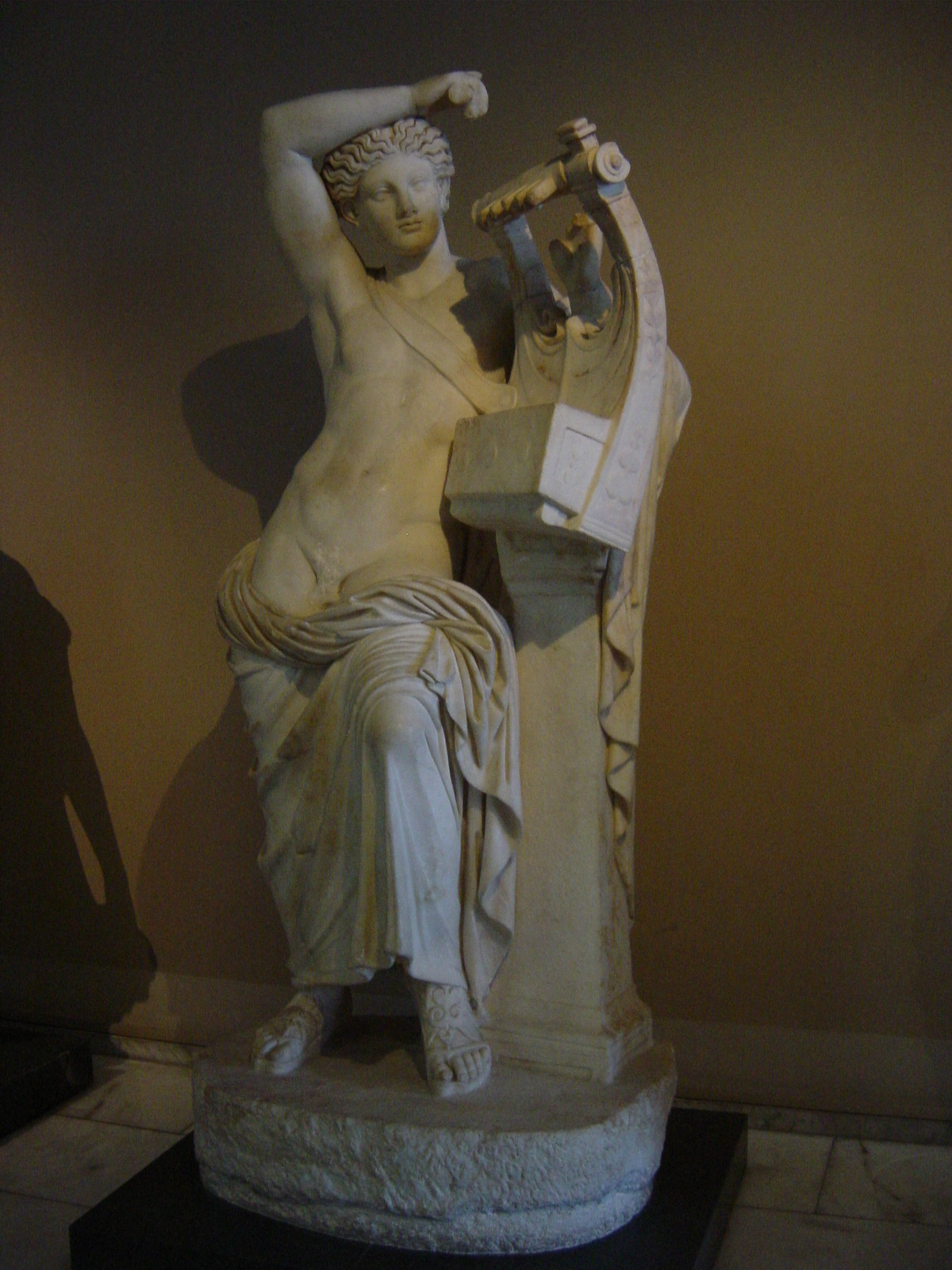
Apollo statue from Miletus in Istanbul Archaeology Museums.

By 550 BCE, the Median Empire, which had existed for barely a hundred years, was suddenly torn apart by a Persian rebellion. As Lydia's king, Croesus had a large amount of wealth which to draw from, and he used it to go on the offensive against the Persian king Cyrus the Great. In the end, Croesus was thrust back west and Cyrus burned the Lydian capital Sardis, taking control of Lydia in 546 BCE.

The remaining kingdom of Ionia and several cities of Lydia still refused to fall under Persian domination, and prepared defenses to fight them and sending for aid from Sparta. Since no aid was promised except for a warning to Cyrus from their emissary, eventually their stance was abandoned and they submitted, or they fled as in citizens from Phocaea to Corsica or citizens from Teos to Abdera in Thrace.

The Achaemenid Persian Empire, thus founded by Cyrus the Great, continued its expansion under the Persia king Darius the Great, in which the satrap system of local governors continued to be used and upgraded and other governmental upgrades were carried out. A revolt by Naxos in 502 BCE prompted Aristagoras of Miletus to devise a grandiose plan by which he would give a share of Naxos's wealth to Artaphernes, satrap of Lydia, in return for his aid in quashing the revolt. The failure of Aristagoras in fulfilling his promise of rewards and his conduct disturbed the Persians, so much so that he resorted to convincing his fellow Ionians to revolt against the Persians. This revolt, known as the Ionian Revolt, spread across Anatolia, and with Athenian aid, Aristagoras held firm for a time, despite the loss in the Battle of Ephesus. The burning of Sardis in 498 BCE enraged Darius so much that he swore revenge upon Athens. This event brought down the hammer upon Aristagoras as the Persian army swept through Ionia, re-taking city by city. It was the eventual Battle of Lade outside Miletus in 494 BCE that put an end to the Ionian Revolt once and for all.

Although the Persian Empire had official control of the Carians as a satrap, the appointed local ruler Hecatomnus took advantage of his position. He gained for his family an autonomous hand in control of the province by providing the Persians with regular tribute, avoiding the look of deception. His son Mausolus continued in this manner, and expanded upon the groundwork laid by his father. He first removed the official capital of the satrap from Mylasa to Halicarnassus, gaining a strategic naval advantage as the new capital was on the ocean. On this land he built a strong fortress and a works by which he could build up a strong navy. He shrewdly used this power to guarantee protection for the citizens of Chios, Kos, and Rhodes as they proclaimed independence from Athenian Greece. Mausolus did not live to see his plans realized fully, and his position went to his widow Artemisia. The local control over Caria remained in Hecatomnus's family for another 20 years before the arrival of Alexander the Great.

=== Hellenistic Anatolia ===
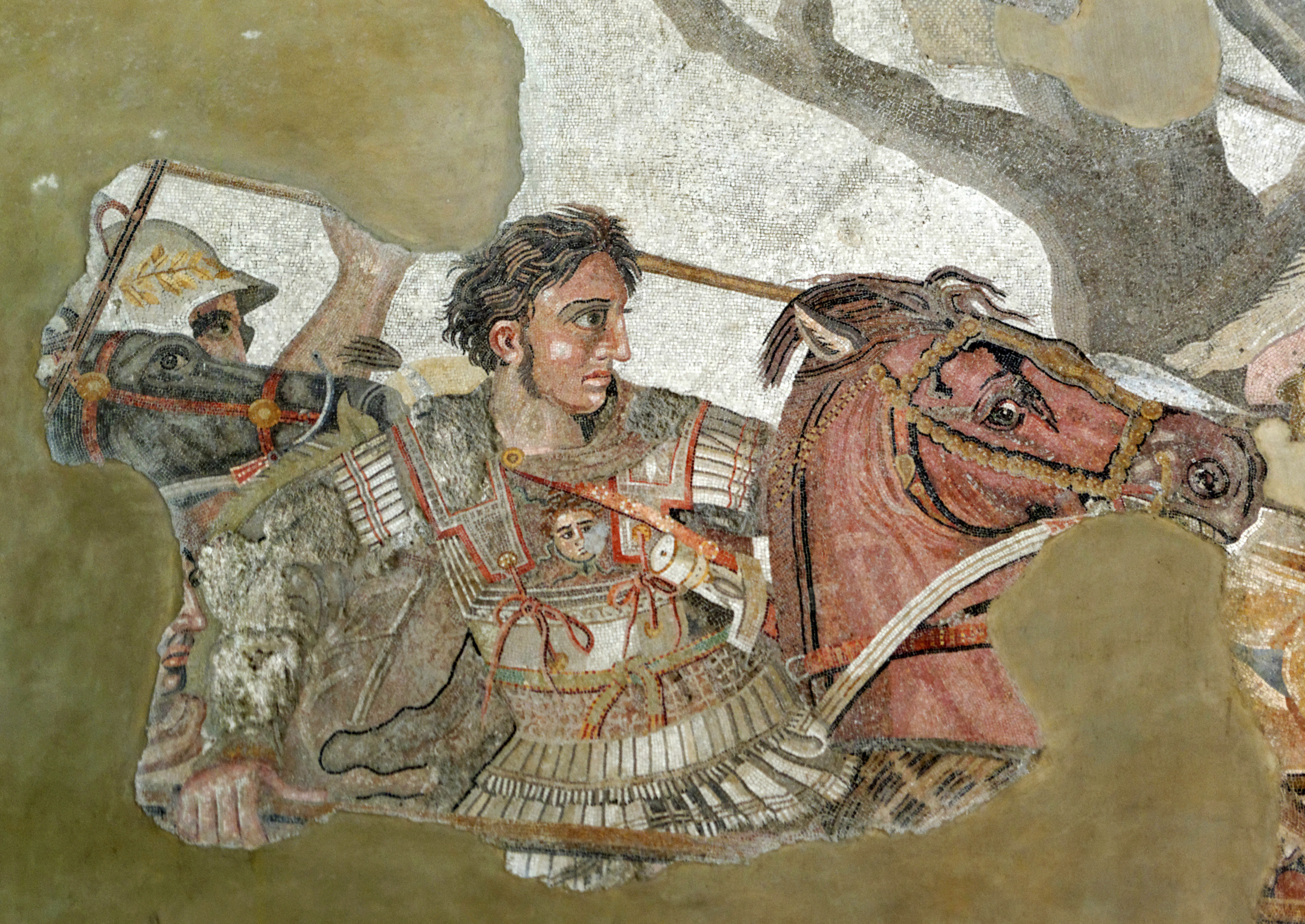
Alexander before the Battle of Issus, the best representation of his likeness

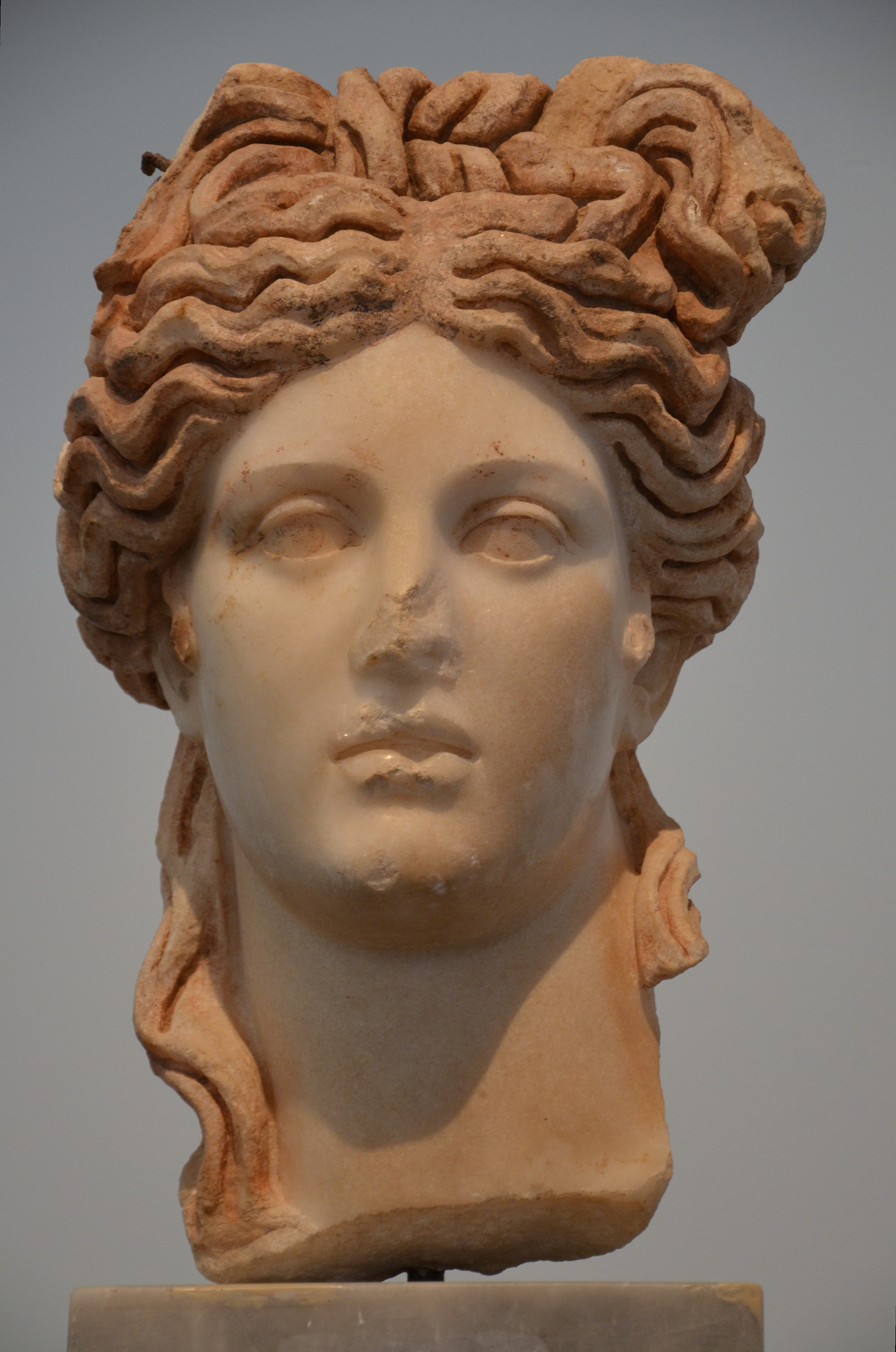
Marble head of a goddess, found in the Hadrianic Baths of Aphrodisias, 2nd century CE.

==== Alexander the Great ====
In 336 BCE, King Philip of Macedon was unexpectedly killed, making his son Alexander the new ruler of Macedon as he was very popular. He immediately went to work, raising a force large enough to go up against the Persians, gathering a navy large enough to counter any threats by their powerful navy. Landing on the shores of Anatolia near Sestos on the Gallipoli in 334 BCE, Alexander first faced the Persian army in the Battle of the Granicus, in which the Persians were effectively routed. Using the victory as a springboard for success, Alexander turned his attention to the rest of the western coast, liberating Lydia and Ionia in quick succession. The eventual fall of Miletus led to the brilliant strategy by Alexander to defeat the Persian navy by taking every city along the Mediterranean instead of initiating a very high-risk battle on the sea. By reducing this threat, Alexander turned inland, rolling through Phyrgia, Cappadocia, and finally Cilicia, before reaching Mount Amanus. Scouts for Alexander found the Persian army, under its king Darius III, advancing through the plains of Issus in search of Alexander. At this moment, Alexander realized that the terrain favored his smaller army, and the Battle of Issus began. Darius's army was effectively squeezed by the Macedonians, leading to not only an embarrassing defeat for Darius, but that he fled back across the Euphrates river, leaving the rest of his family in Alexander's hands. Thus, Anatolia was freed from the Persian yoke for good.

==== Wars of the Diadochi and division of Alexander's empire ====
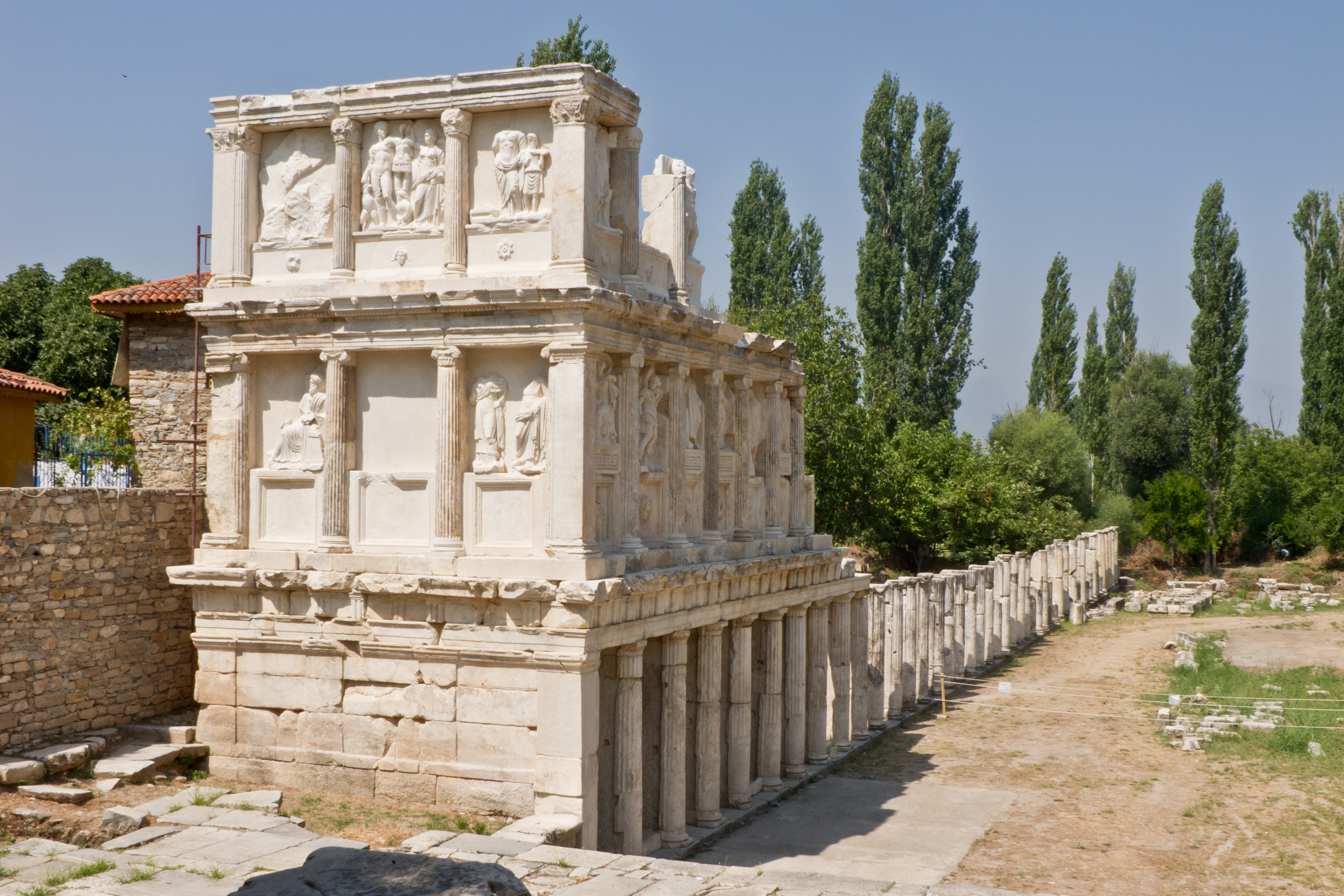
The Sebasteion of Aphrodisias

In June 323 BCE, Alexander died suddenly, leaving a power vacuum in Macedon, putting all he had worked for at risk. Being that his half-brother Arrhidaeus was unable to rule effectively due to a serious disability, a succession of wars over the rights to his conquests were fought known as the Wars of the Diadochi. Perdiccas, a high-ranking officer of the cavalry, and later Antigonus, the Phrygian satrap, prevailed over the other contenders of Alexander's empire in Asia for a time.

Ptolemy, the governor of Egypt, Lysimachus, and Seleucus, strong leaders of Alexander's, consolidated their positions after the Battle of Ipsus, in which their common rival Antigonus was defeated. The former empire of Alexander was divided as such: Ptolemy gained territory in southern Anatolia, much of Egypt and the Levant, which combined to form the Ptolemaic Empire; Lysimachus controlled western Anatolia and Thrace, while Seleucus claimed the rest of Anatolia as the Seleucid Empire. Only the kingdom of Pontus under Mithridates I managed to gain their independence in Anatolia due to the fact that Antigonus had been a common enemy.

==== Seleucid Empire ====
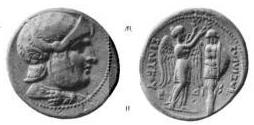
Seleucus I Nicator, namesake of the Seleucid Empire

Seleucus I Nicator first created a capital city over the span of 12 years (299–287 BCE) worthy of his personage, Antioch, named after his father Antiochus. He concentrated also on creating a large standing army, and also divided his empire into 72 satrapies for easier administration. After a peaceful beginning, a rift occurred between Lysimachus and Seleucus that led to open warfare in 281 BCE. Even though Seleucus had managed to defeat his former friend and gain his territory at the Battle of Corupedium, it cost him his life as he was assassinated by Ptolemy Keraunos, future king of Macedon, in Lysimachia.

After the death of Seleucus, the empire he left faced many trials, both from internal and external forces. Antiochus I fought off an attack from the Gauls successfully, but could not defeat the King of Pergamon Eumenes I in 262 BCE, guaranteeing Pergamon's independence. Antiochus II named Theos, or "divine", was poisoned by his first wife, who in turn poisoned Berenice Phernophorus, second wife of Antiochus and the daughter of Ptolemy III Euergetes. Antiochus II's son from his first wife, Seleucus II Callinicus, ended up as ruler of the Seleucids after this tragedy. These turn of events made Ptolemy III very angry, and led to the invasion of the empire (the Third Syrian War) in 246 BCE. This invasion leads to victory for Ptolemy III at Antioch and Seleucia, and he grants the lands of Phrygia to Pontus's Mithridates II in 245 BCE as a wedding gift.

==== Parthia and Pergamon before 200 BCE ====
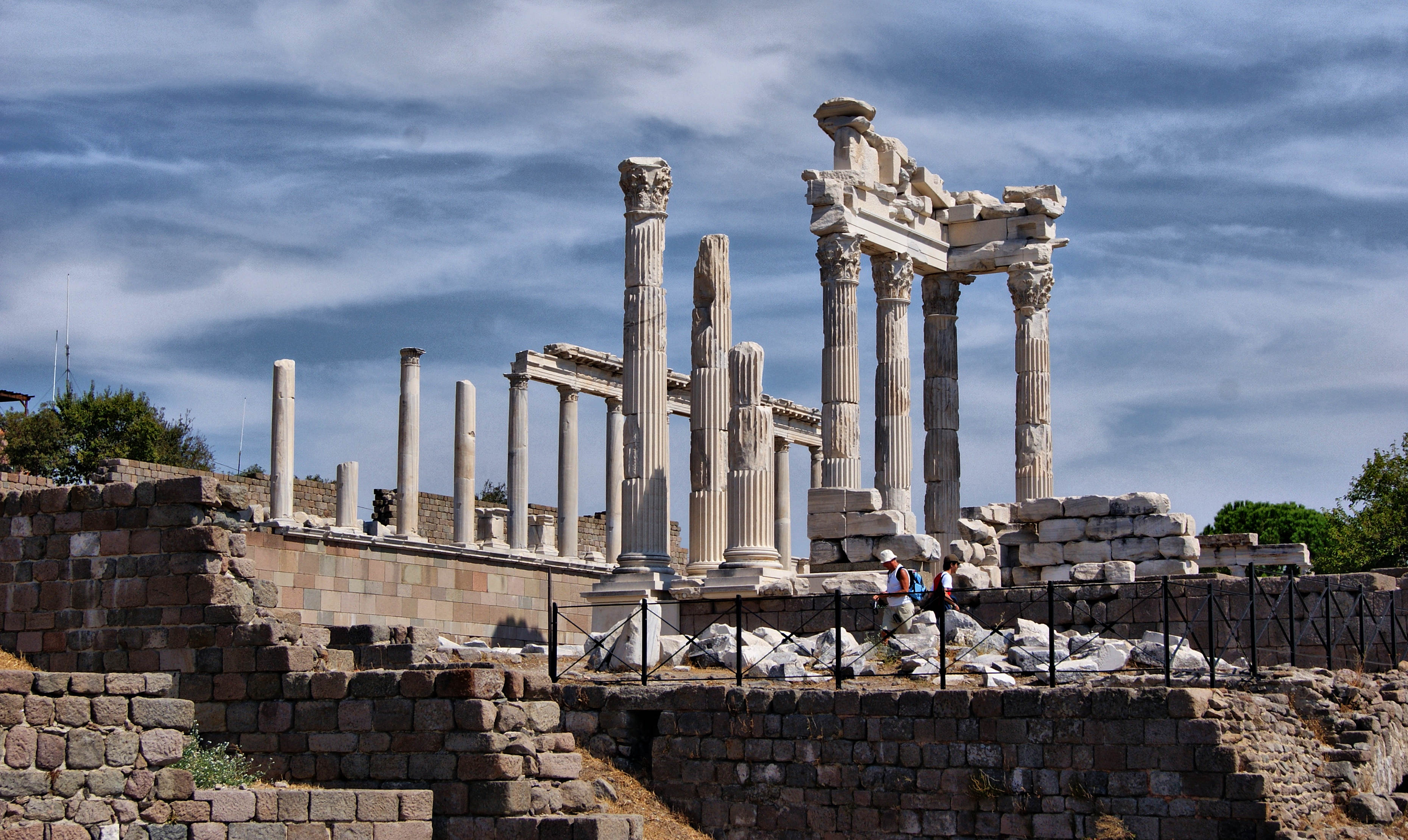
The ruins of the ancient city of Pergamon

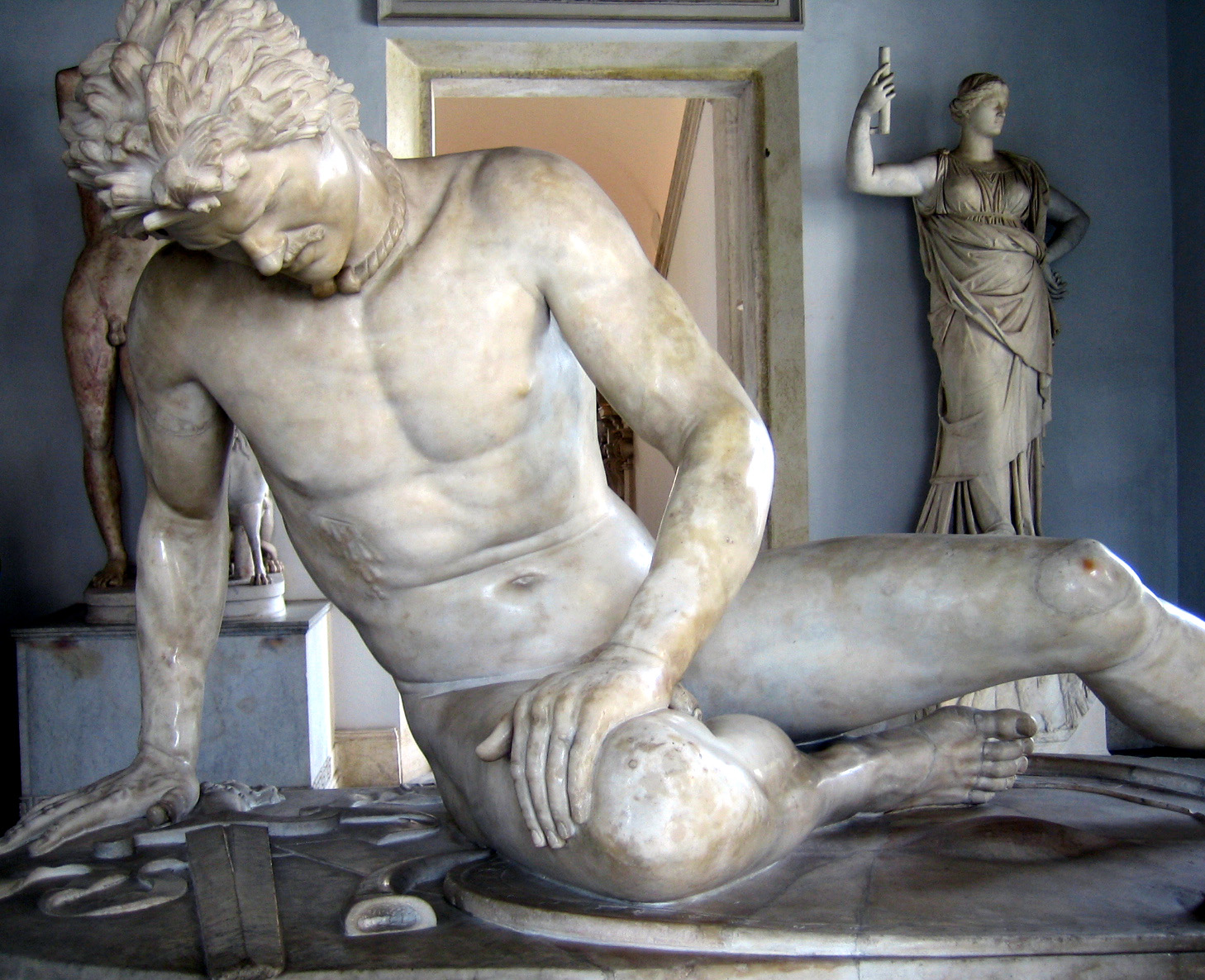
The Dying Gaul representing the defeat of the Galatians by Attalus I.

Events in the east showed the fragile nature of the Seleucids as a Bactrian-inspired revolt in Parthia begun by its satrap Andragoras in 245 BCE led to the loss of territory bordering Persia. This was coupled with an unexpected invasion of northern Parthia by the nomadic Parni in 238 BCE and a subsequent occupation of the whole of Parthia by one of their leaders, Tiridates. Antiochus II Theos of the Seleucids failed to end the rebellion, and therefore a new kingdom was created, the Parthian Empire, under Tiridates's brother Arsaces I. Parthia extended to the Euphrates river at the height of its power.

The kingdom of Pergamon under the Attalid dynasty was an independent kingdom established after the rule of Philetaerus by his nephew Eumenes I. Eumenes enlarged Pergamon to include parts of Mysia and Aeolis, and held tightly onto the ports of Elaia and Pitane. Attalus I, successor of Eumenes I, remained active outside of the boundaries of Pergamon. He refused protection payment to the Galatians and won a fight against them in 230 BCE, and then defeated Antiochus Hierax three years later in order to secure nominal control over Anatolia under the Seleucids. The victory was not to last as Seleucus III reestablished control of his empire, but Attalus was allowed to retain control of former territories of Pergamon.

The dealings with Attalus proved to be the last time the Seleucids had any meaningful success in Anatolia as the Roman Empire lay on the horizon. After that victory, Seleucus's heirs would never again expand their empire.

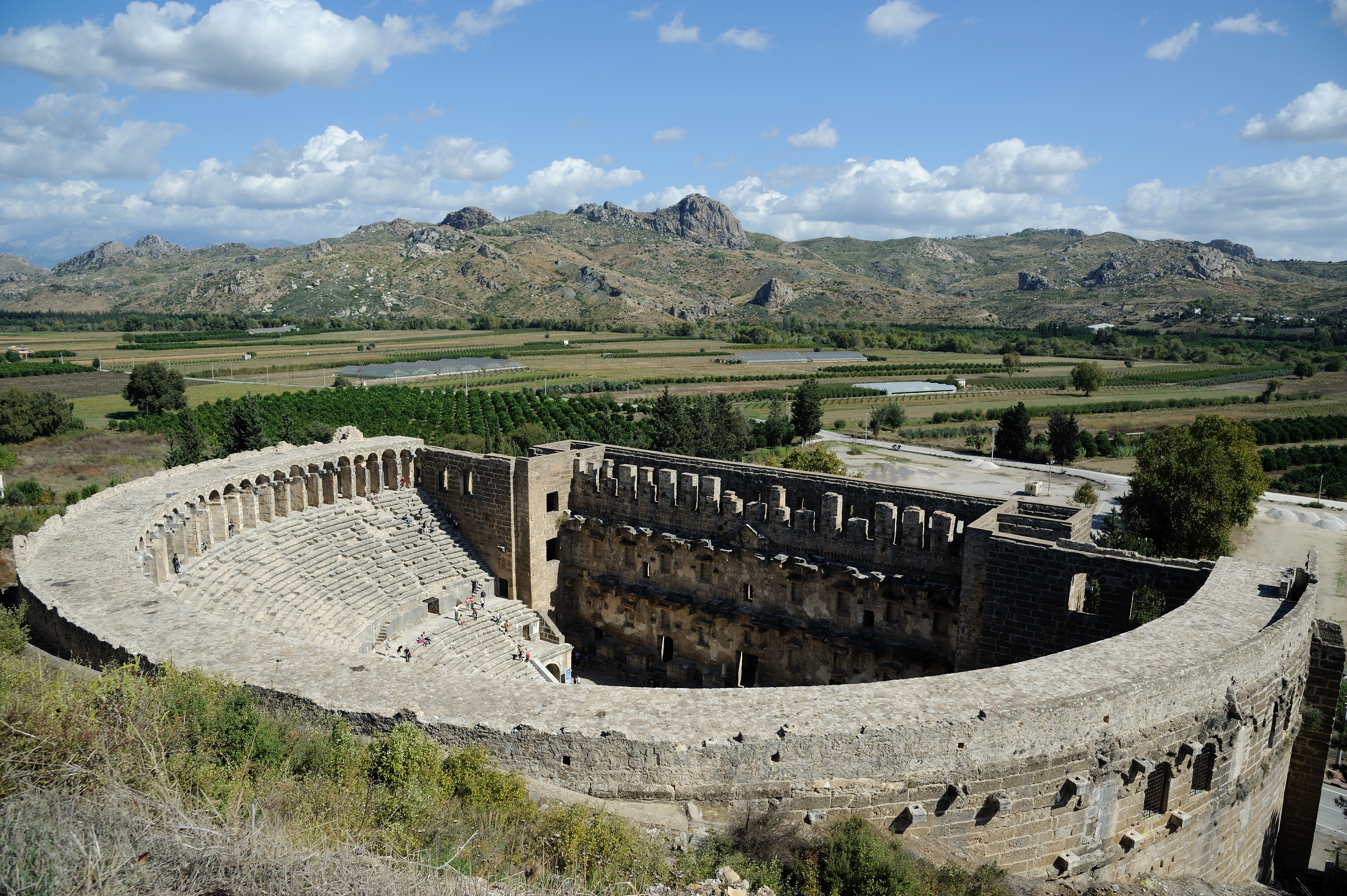
The Roman theatre in Aspendos has been preserved remarkably well.

=== Roman Anatolia ===
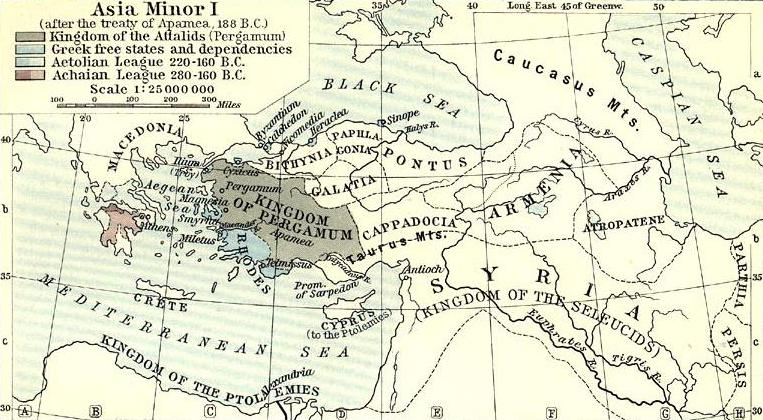
Anatolia after the Treaty of Apamea in 188 BCE.

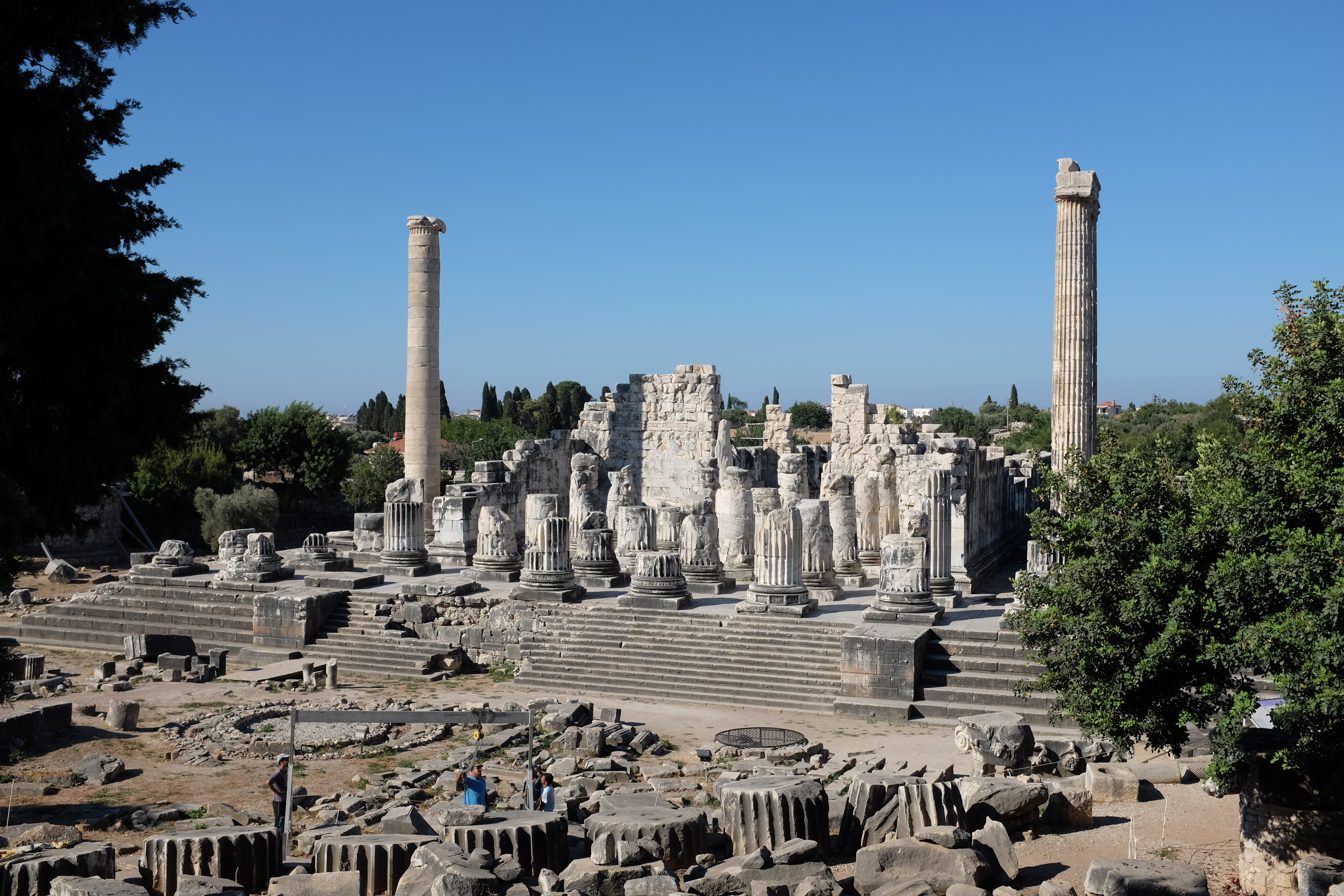
Ancient city of Didyma

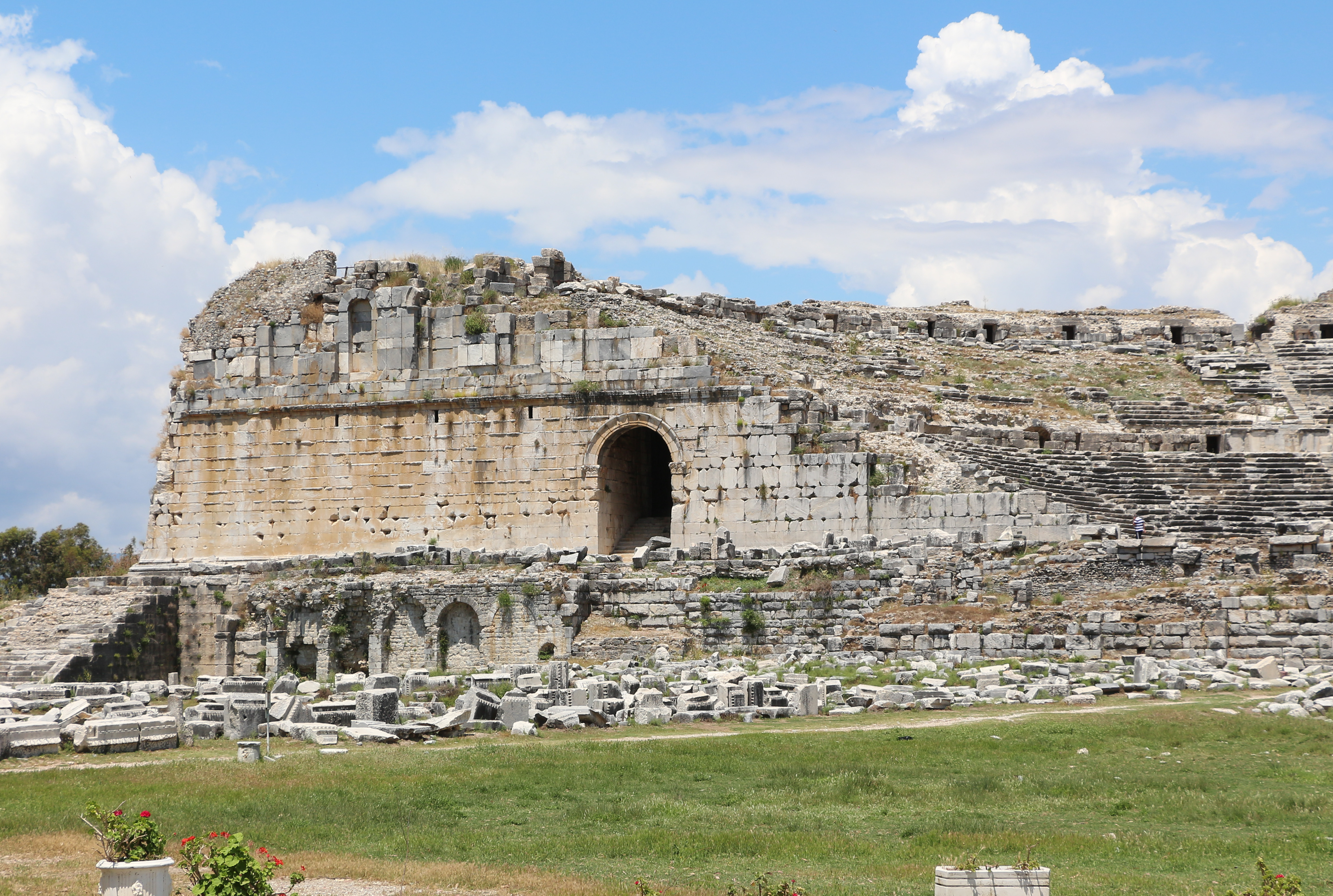
Ancient Greek theatre in Miletus. It is the birthplace of Thales

==== Roman intervention in Anatolia ====
In the Second Punic War, Rome had suffered in Spain, Africa, and Italy because of the impressive strategies of Hannibal, the famous Carthaginian general. When Hannibal entered into an alliance with Philip V of Macedon in 215 BCE, Rome used a small naval force with the Aetolian League to help ward off Hannibal in the east and to prevent Macedonian expansion in western Anatolia. Attalus I of Pergamon, along with Rhodes, traveled to Rome and helped convince the Romans that war against Macedon was supremely necessary. The Roman general Titus Quinctius Flamininus not only soundly defeated Philip's army in the Battle of Cynoscephalae in 197 BCE, but also brought further hope to the Greeks when he said that an autonomous Greece and Greek cities in Anatolia was what Rome desired.

During the period just after Rome's victory, the Aetolian League desired some of the spoils left in the wake of Philip's defeat, and requested a shared expedition with Antiochus III of the Seleucids to obtain it. Despite warnings by Rome, Antiochus left Thrace and ventured into Greece, deciding to ally himself with the League. This was intolerable for Rome, and they soundly defeated him in Thessaly at Thermopylae before Antiochus retreated to Anatolia near Sardis. Combining forces with the Romans, Eumenes II of Pergamon met Antiochus in the Battle of Magnesia in 189 BCE. There Antiochus was thrashed by an intensive cavalry charge by the Romans and an outflanking maneuver by Eumenes.

Because of the Treaty of Apamea the very next year, Pergamon was granted all of the Seleucid lands north of the Taurus Mountains and Rhodes was given all that remained. This seemingly great reward would be the downfall of Eumenes as an effective ruler, for after Pergamon defeated Prusias I of Bithynia and Pharnaces I of Pontus, he delved too deeply into Roman affairs and the Roman senate became alarmed. When Eumenes put down an invasion by the Galatians in 184 BCE, Rome countered his victory by freeing them, providing a heavy indicator that the scope of Pergamon's rule was now stunted.

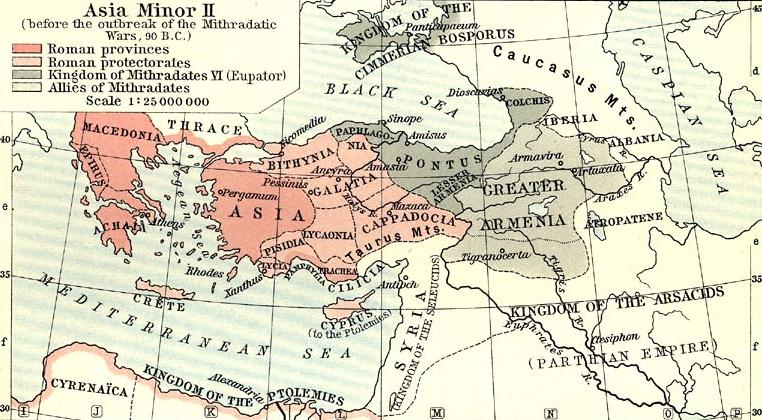
Anatolia before the Mithridatic War, 90 BCE.

The interior of Anatolia had been relatively stable despite occasional incursions by the Galatians until the rise of the kingdoms of Pontus and Cappadocia in the 2nd century BCE. Cappadocia under Ariarathes IV initially was allied with the Seleucids in their war against Rome, but he soon changed his mind and repaired relations with them by marriage and his conduct. His son, Ariarathes V Philopator, continued his father's policy of allying with Rome and even joined with them in battle against Prusias I of Bithynia when he died in 131 BCE. Pontus had been an independent kingdom since the rule of Mithridates when the threat of Macedon had been removed. Despite several attempts by the Seleucid Empire to defeat Pontus, independence was maintained. When Rome became involved in Anatolian affairs under Pharnaces I, an alliance was formed that guaranteed protection for the kingdom. The other major kingdom in Anatolia, Bithynia, established by Nicomedes I at Nicomedia, always maintained good relations with Rome. Even under the hated Prusias II of Bithynia when that relationship was strained it did not cause much trouble.

The rule of Rome in Anatolia was unlike any other part of their empire because of their light hand with regards to government and organization. Controlling unstable elements within the region was made simpler by the bequeathal of Pergamon to the Romans by its last king, Attalus III in 133 BCE. The new territory was named the province of Asia by Roman consul Manius Aquillius the Elder.

==== The Mithridatic Wars ====
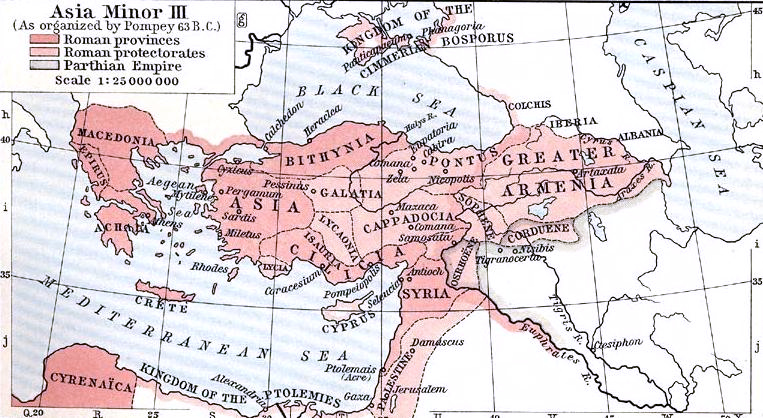
Anatolia as divided by Pompey, 63 BCE.

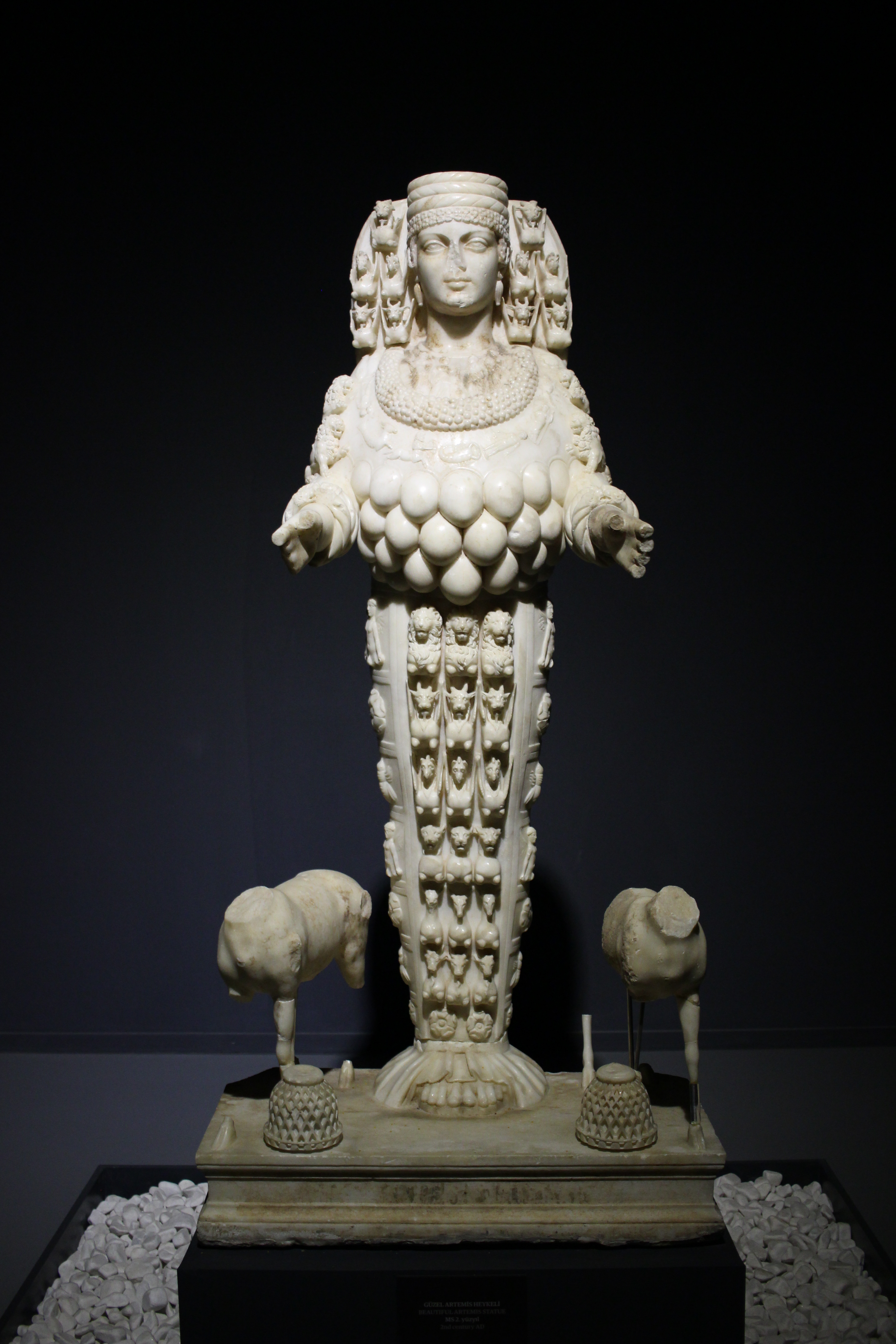
Statue of Artemis of Ephesus

The Mithridatic Wars were preceded by infighting that drew Rome into a war against Italian rebels known as the Social War in 90 BCE. Mithridates VI of Pontus decided that it was time to strike in Anatolia while Rome was occupied, overrunning Bithynia. Though he withdrew when this was demanded of him by Rome he did not agree to all Rome's demands. As a result, Rome encouraged Bithynia to attack Pontus but Bithynia was defeated. Mithridates then marched into the Roman province of Asia, where he persuaded Greeks to slaughter as many Italians as possible (the Asiatic Vespers). Despite a power struggle within Rome itself, consul Cornelius Sulla went to Anatolia to defeat the Pontian king. Sulla defeated him thoroughly in and left Mithridates with only Pontus in the Treaty of Dardanos.

In 74 BCE, another Anatolian kingdom passed under Roman control as Nicomedes IV of Bithynia instructed it to be done after his death. Making Bithynia a Roman province soon after roused Mithridates VI to once again go after more territory, and he invaded it in the same year. Rome this time sent consul Lucius Licinius Lucullus to take back control of the province. The expedition proved to be very positive as Mithridates was driven back into the mountains.

The failure of Lucius Licinius Lucullus to rid Rome once and for all of Mithridates brought a lot of opposition back at home, some fueled by the great Roman consul Pompey. A threat by pirates on the Roman food supply in the Aegean Sea brought Pompey once again to the forefront of Roman politics, and he drove them back to Cilicia. The powers granted Pompey after this success allowed him to not only throw back Mithridates all the way to the Bosphorus, but made neighboring Armenia a client kingdom. In the end, Mithridates committed suicide in 63 BCE, and therefore allowed Rome to add Pontus as a protectorate along with Cilicia as a Roman province. This left only Galatia, Pisidia and Cappadocia, all ruled by Amyntas in whole, as the last remaining kingdom not under a protectorate or provincial status. However, in 25 BCE, Amyntas died while pursuing enemies in the Taurus Mountains, and Rome claimed his lands as a province, leaving Anatolia completely in Roman hands.

==== Christianity in Anatolia during Roman times ====
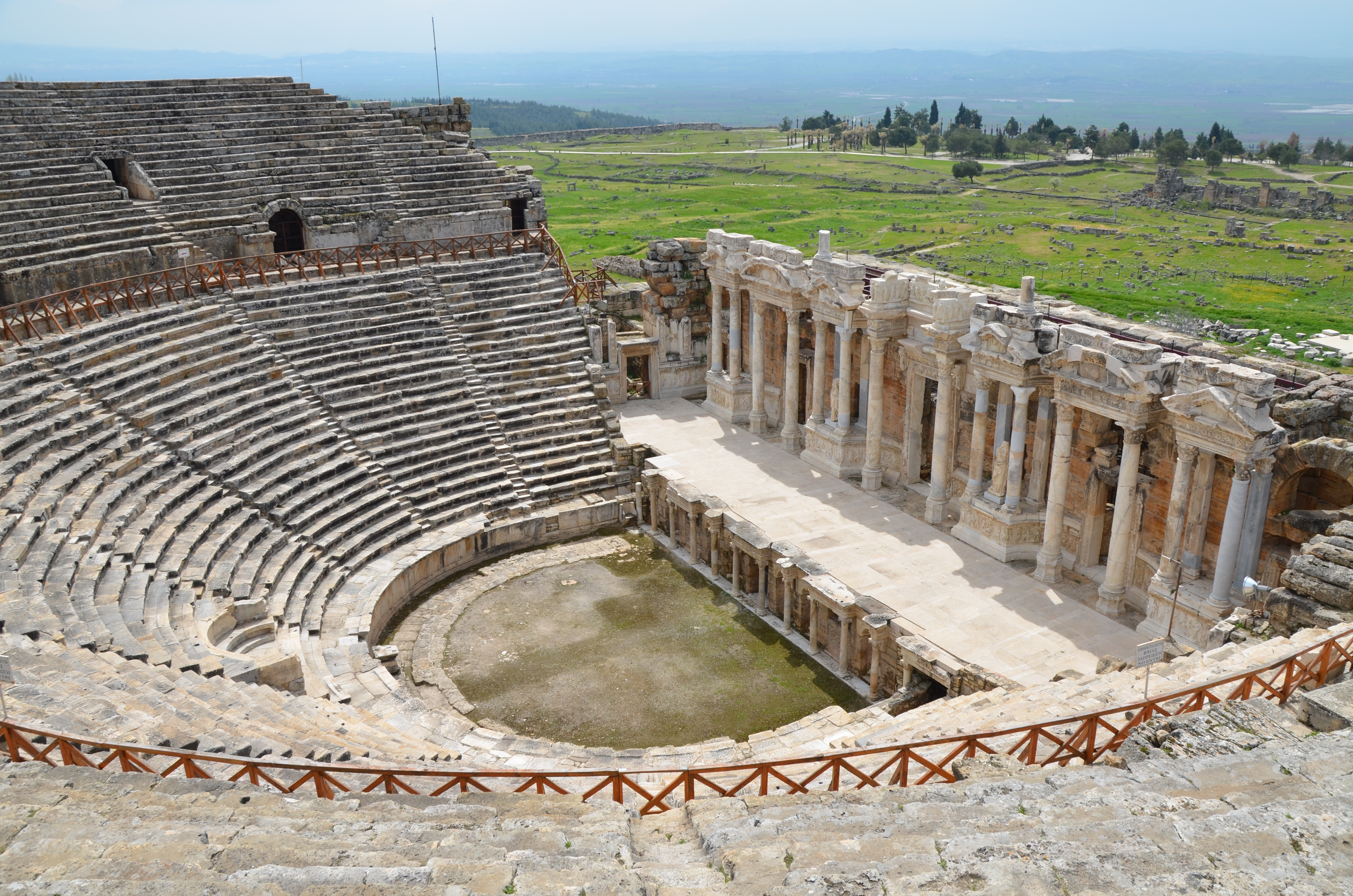
Philip the Apostle lived and buried in Hierapolis, Turkey

Jewish influences in Anatolia were changing the religious makeup of the region as Rome consolidated its power. In about 210 BCE, Antiochus III of the Seleucid Empire relocated 2,000 families of Jews from Babylonia to Lydia and Phrygia, and this kind of migration continued throughout the remainder of the Empire's existence. Additional clues to the size of the Jewish influence in the area were provided by Cicero, who noted that a fellow Roman governor had halted the tribute sent to Jerusalem by Jews in 66 BCE, and the record of Ephesus, where the people urged Agrippina to expel Jews because they were not active in their religious activities.

The blossoming religious following of Christianity was evident in Anatolia during the beginning of the 1st century. The letters of St. Paul in the New Testament reflect this growth, particularly in his home province of Asia. From his home in Ephesus from 54 AD to 56 AD he noted that "all they which dwelt in Asia heard the word" and verified the existence of a church in Colossae as well as Troas. Later he received letters from Magnesia and Tralleis, both of which already had churches, bishops, and official representatives who supported Ignatius of Antioch. After the references to these institutions by St. Paul, the Book of Revelation mentions the Seven Churches of Asia: Ephesus, Magnesia, Thyatira, Smyrna, Philadelphia, Pergamon, and Laodicea. Even other non-Christians started to take notice of the new religion. In 112 the Roman governor in Bithynia wrote to the Roman emperor Trajan that so many different people were flocking to Christianity that it was leaving the temples vacated.

==== Anatolia before the 4th century: Peace and the Goths ====
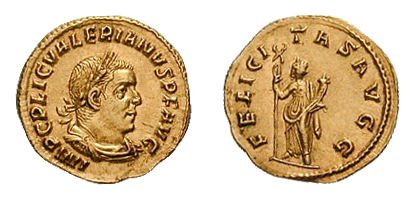
Aureus of emperor Valerian.

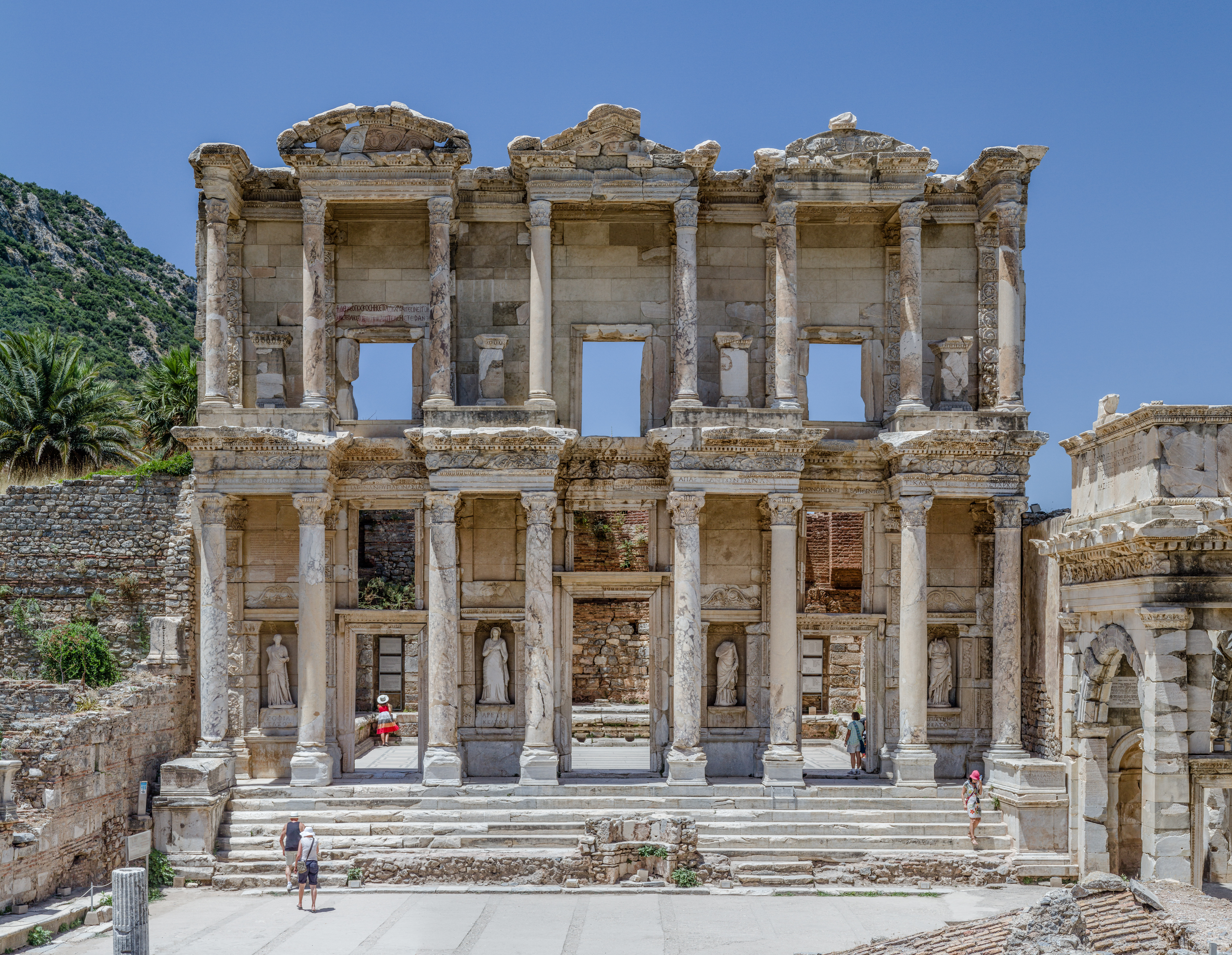
Paul the Apostle lived in Ephesus, Turkey. Ephesus was one of the seven cities addressed in the Book of Revelation.

From the rule of Augustus onwards until that of Constantine I, Anatolia enjoyed relative peace that allowed itself to grow as a region. The emperor Augustus removed all debts owed to the Roman Empire by the provinces and protectorates there, making advanced progress possible. Roads were built to connect the larger cities in order to improve trade and transportation, and the abundance of high outputs in agricultural pursuits made more money for everyone involved. Settlement was encouraged, and local governors did not place a heavy burden upon the people with regards to taxation. The wealth gained from the peace and prosperity prevented great tragedy as powerful earthquakes tore through the region, and help was given from the Roman government and other parties. Through it all was produced some of the most respected scientific men of that period–the philosopher Dio of Bithynia, the medical mind of Galen from Pergamon, and the historians Memnon of Heraclea and Cassius Dio of Nicaea.

By the middle of the 3rd century, everything that had been built by peace was being threatened by a new enemy, the Goths. As the inroads to central Europe through Macedonia, Italy, and Germania were all defended successfully by the Romans, the Goths found Anatolia to be irresistible due to its wealth and deteriorating defenses. Using a captured fleet of ships from the Bosphorus and flat-bottomed boats to cross the Black Sea, they sailed in 256 around the eastern shores, landing in the coastal city of Trebizond. What ensued was a huge embarrassment for Pontus — the wealth of the city was absconded, a larger number of ships were confiscated, and they entered the interior without much to turn them back. A second invasion of Anatolia through Bithynia brought even more terror inland and wanton destruction. The Goths entered Chalcedon and used it as a base by which to expand their operations, sacking Nicomedia, Prusa, Apamea, Cius, and Nicaea in turn. Only the turn of the weather during a fall season kept them from doing any more harm to those outside the realm of the province. The Goths managed a third attack upon not only the coastline of western Anatolia, but in Greece and Italy as well. Despite the Romans under their emperor Valerian finally turning them away, it did not stop the Goths from first destroying the Temple of Diana in Ephesus and the city itself in 263.

== Byzantine Anatolia ==
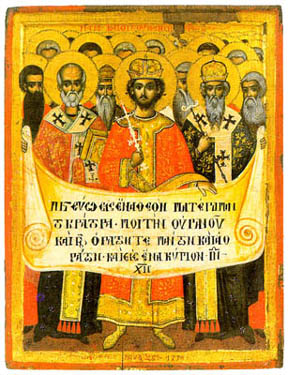
An icon representing Constantine as a saint and others in Nicaea in 325, as well as the Nicaean Creed.

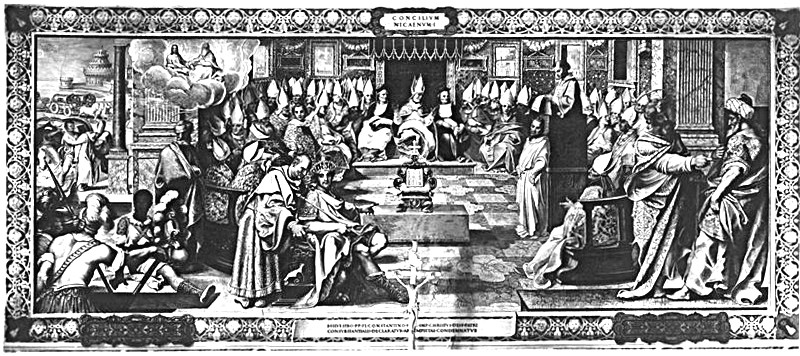
Fresco depicting the First Council of Nicaea.

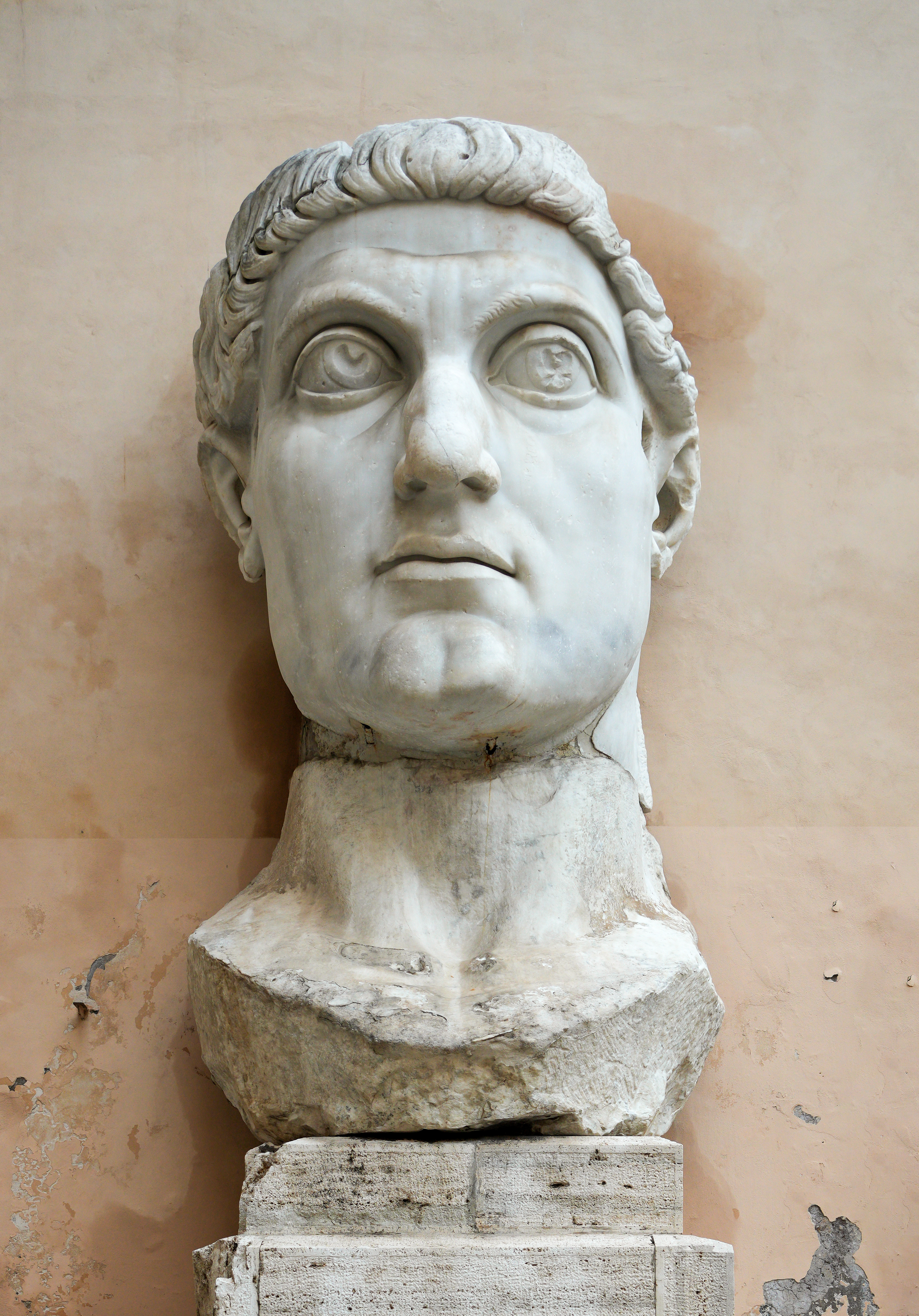
Constantine the Great was the first Roman emperor to convert to Christianity

The constant instability of the Roman Empire as a whole gradually made it more and more difficult to control. Upon the ascension of the emperor Constantine in 330, he made a bold decision by removing himself from Rome and into a new capital. Located in the old city of Byzantium, now known as Constantinople after the emperor, it was strengthened and improved in order to assure more than adequate defense of the whole region. What added to the prestige of the city was Constantine's favor of Christianity. He allowed bishops and other religious figures to aid in the government of the empire, and he personally intervened in the First Council of Nicaea to prove his sincerity.

The next forty years after the death of Constantine in 337 saw a power struggle amongst his descendants for control of the empire. His three sons, Constantine, Constans, and Constantius were unable to coexist peacefully under a joint rule, and they eventually resorted to violent means to end the arrangement. A short time after taking power, a purge of a majority of their relations began and the blood of Constantine's progeny flowed. Eventually Constans came after and killed Constantine II near Aquileia, but was soon removed and himself murdered by his own army. This left Constantius II as the sole emperor of the Byzantines, but even this would not last. Despite supporting his cousin Julian as commander of the armies in Gaul, events soon forced Julian to ignore Constantine's orders to move eastward with his armies and to head straight for Constantinople to claim the imperial purple. The death of Constantius II in Tarsus resulted in a bloodless transfer of power in 361. Julian did not survive but a scant year and a half thanks to a Persian spear, but during that time he tried to revert what progress Christianity had made after the founding of the empire. Even on his deathbed he was supposed to have said "Thou hast conquered, Galilean.", a reference to Christianity besting him.

The threat of barbarian invasion and its effects upon the Roman Empire in the west carried over into the east. After a short rule by the emperor Jovian and a joint rule of both empires by Valentinian II in the west and Valens in the east, the young emperor Gratian made what was to be a very fortunate decision. He chose the favored general Theodosius I to rule with his as a co-emperor, granting him authority over all of the domains of the Byzantine empire in 379. This proved to be a wise decision with regards to the survival of his newly obtained dominion, for he immediately set about healing the religious rifts that had emerged during the insecurity of past years. The practice of Arianism and pagan rites were abolished, and the standards set by Constantine in Nicaea were restored by law. By 395, the year in which the Roman Empire was officially divided in half and the aptly named Theodosius the Great died, the east was so strong that it could now be considered an equal.

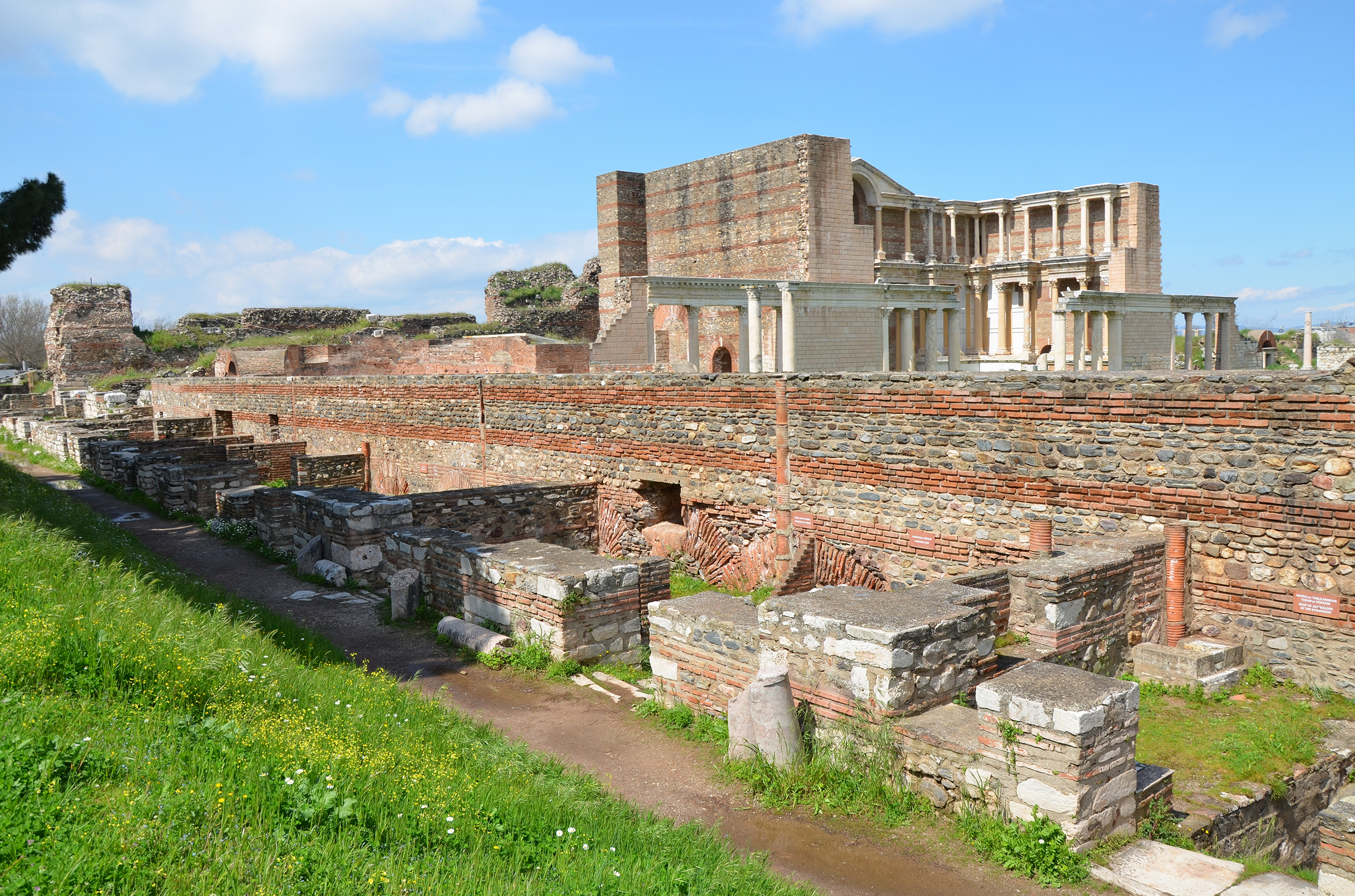
Remains of the Greek Byzantine shops and the Bath-Gymnasium Complex in Sardis

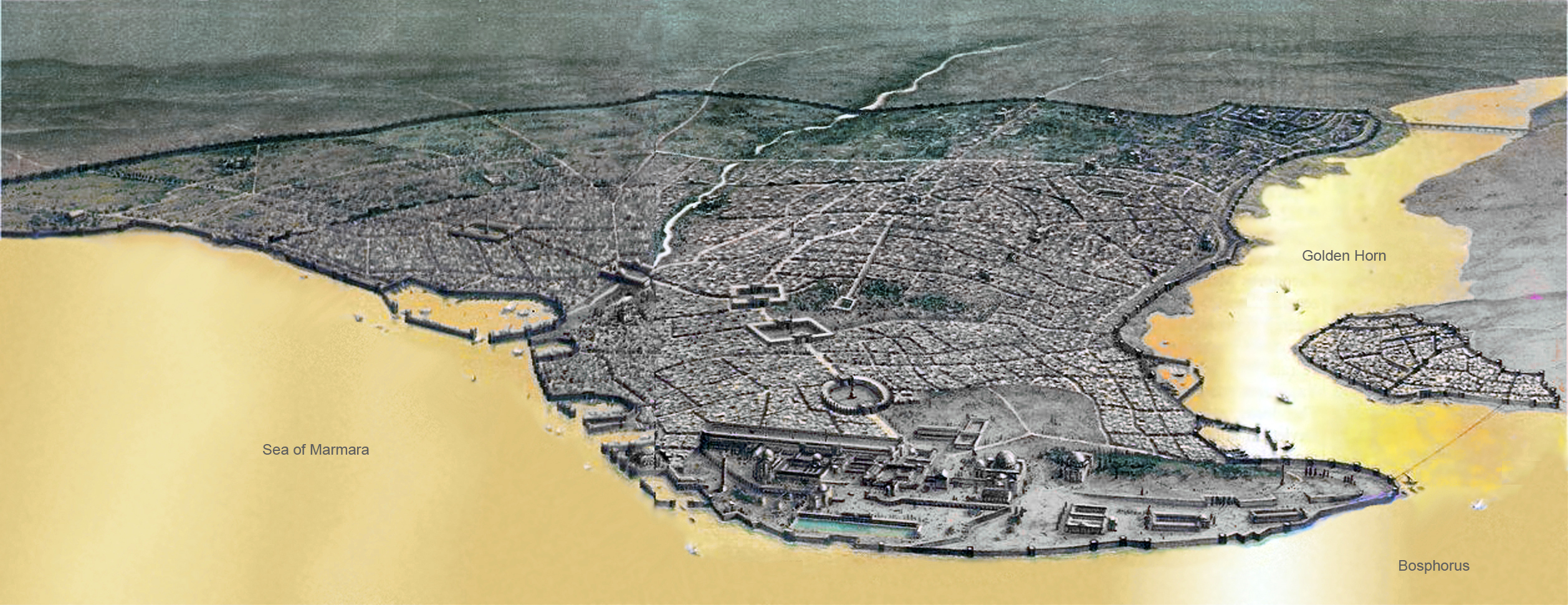
Constantinople in Byzantine times

As a symbol and expression of the universal prestige of the Patriarchate of Constantinople, Justinian I built the Church of the Holy Wisdom of God, Hagia Sophia, which was completed in the short period of four and a half years (532–537).

The Byzantine Empire was the predominantly Greek-speaking continuation of the Roman Empire during Late Antiquity and the Middle Ages. Its capital city was Constantinople (modern-day Istanbul), originally known as Byzantium. Initially the eastern half of the Roman Empire (often called the Eastern Roman Empire in this context), it survived the 5th century fragmentation and fall of the Western Roman Empire and continued to exist for an additional thousand years until it fell to the Ottoman Turks in 1453.

=== Persian intervention ===
The Sassanid Persians, after having fought centuries of wars against the Byzantines and at their peak sieged Constantinople together with the Avars, paved the way for a new threat to enter onto the scene; the Arabs.

=== Arab conquests and threats ===
Arab attacks throughout the empire reduced significantly the territory once held under Justinian. While this resulted in the loss of much of the Byzantine Empire's diversity in languages and religious views, regions such as Cappadocia experienced the influx of Armenians, Jacobite Syrians and Georgians who were invited by the Byzantine emperors as settlers in this border region.

== The Seljuks and Anatolian beyliks ==
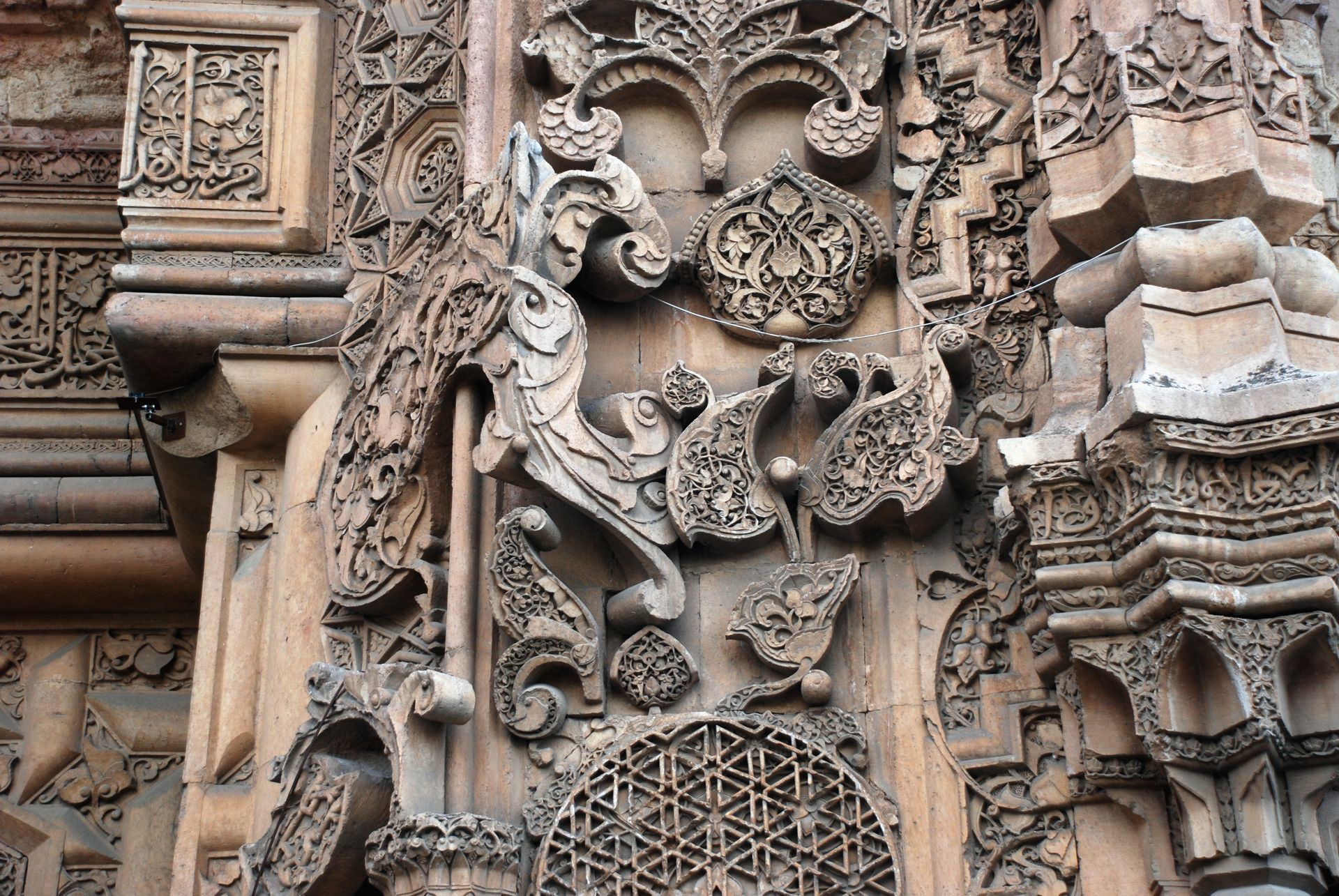
Divriği Great Mosque and Hospital in Turkey built between 1228 and 1229 by the local dynasty of the Mengujekids

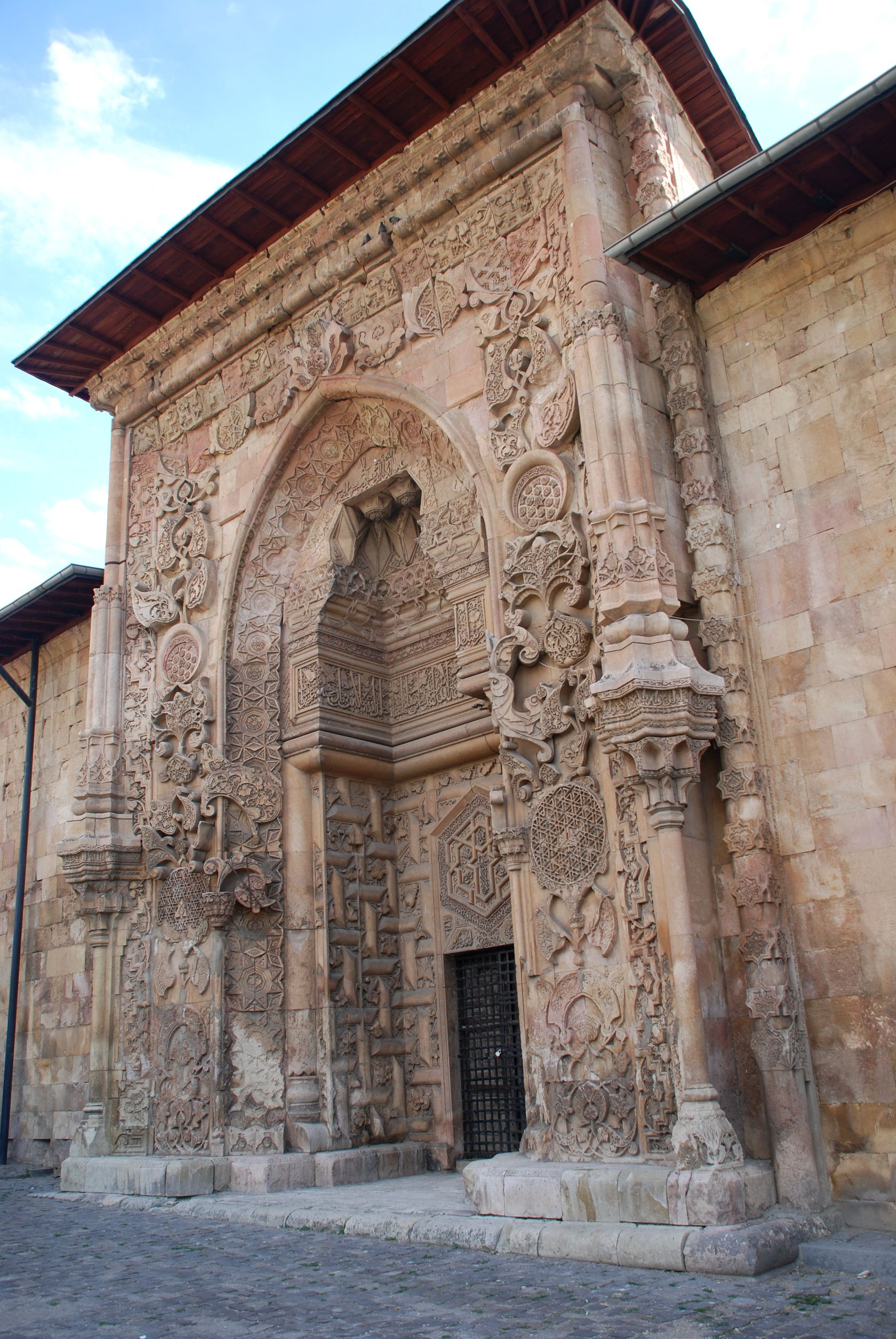
Divriği Great Mosque and Hospital is a UNESCO World Heritage Site

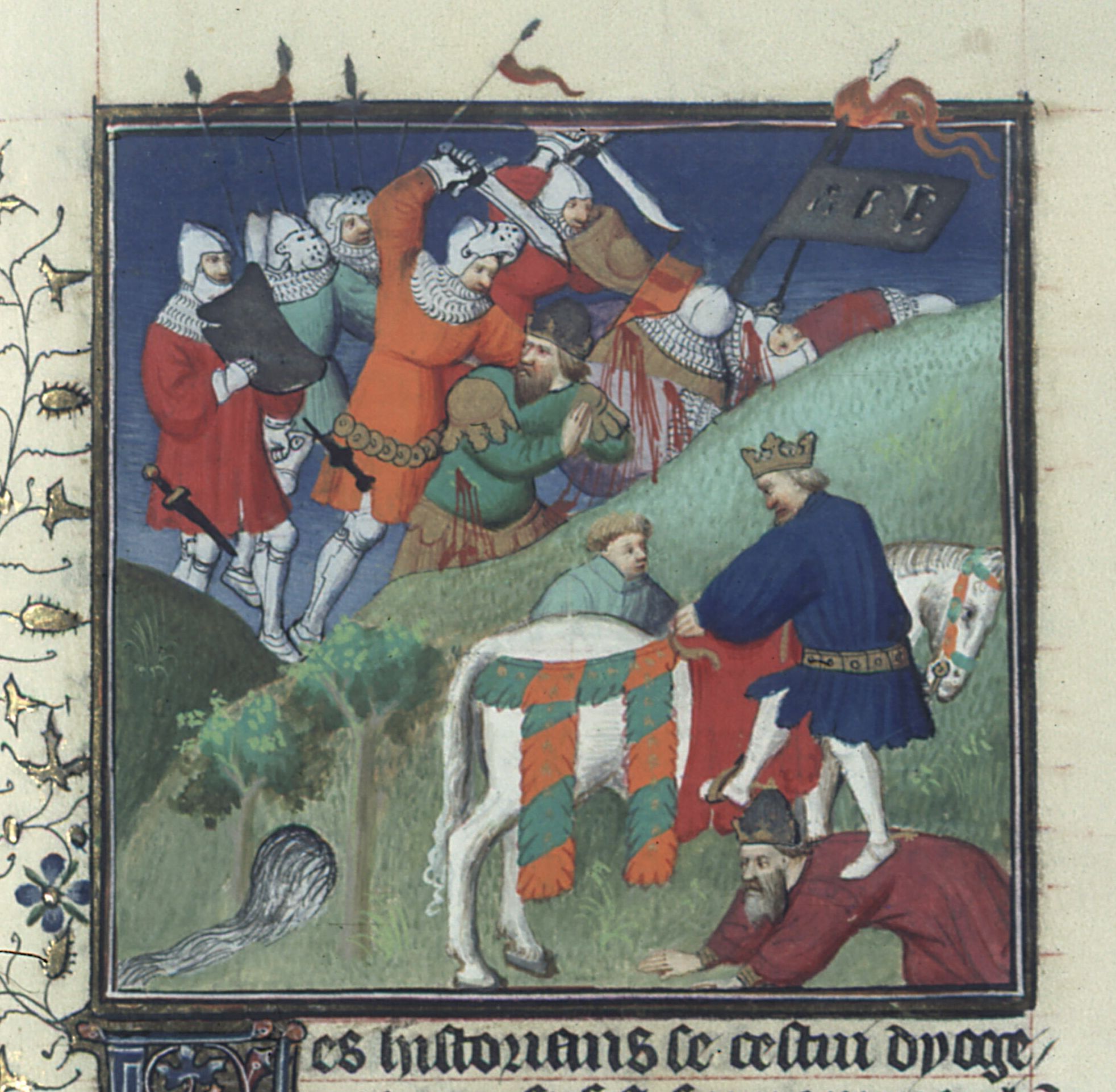
Battle of Manzikert

The population of Anatolia and Balkans including Greece was estimated at 10.7 million in 600 CE, whereas Asia Minor was probably around 8 million during the early part of Middle Ages (950 to 1348 CE). The estimated population for Asia Minor around 1204 CE was 6 million, including 3 million in Seljuk territory. The migration of Turks to the country of modern Turkey occurred during the main Turkic migration across most of Central Asia and into Europe and the Middle East which was between the 6th and 11th centuries. Mainly Turkic people living in the Seljuk Empire arrived in Turkey during the eleventh century. The Seljuks proceeded to gradually conquer the Anatolian part of the Byzantine Empire.

The House of Seljuk was a branch of the Kınık Oğuz Turks who resided on the periphery of the Muslim world, north of the Caspian and Aral Seas in the Yabghu Khaganate of the Oğuz confederacy in the 10th century. In the 11th century, the Turkic people living in the Seljuk Empire started migrating from their ancestral homelands towards east of Anatolia, which eventually became a new homeland of Oğuz Turkic tribes following the Battle of Manzikert on August 26, 1071.

The victory of the Seljuks gave rise to the Seljuk Sultanate of Rum, a separate branch of the larger Seljuk Empire and to some Turkish principalities (beyliks), mostly situated towards the east which were vassals of or at war with Seljuk Sultanate of Rum.

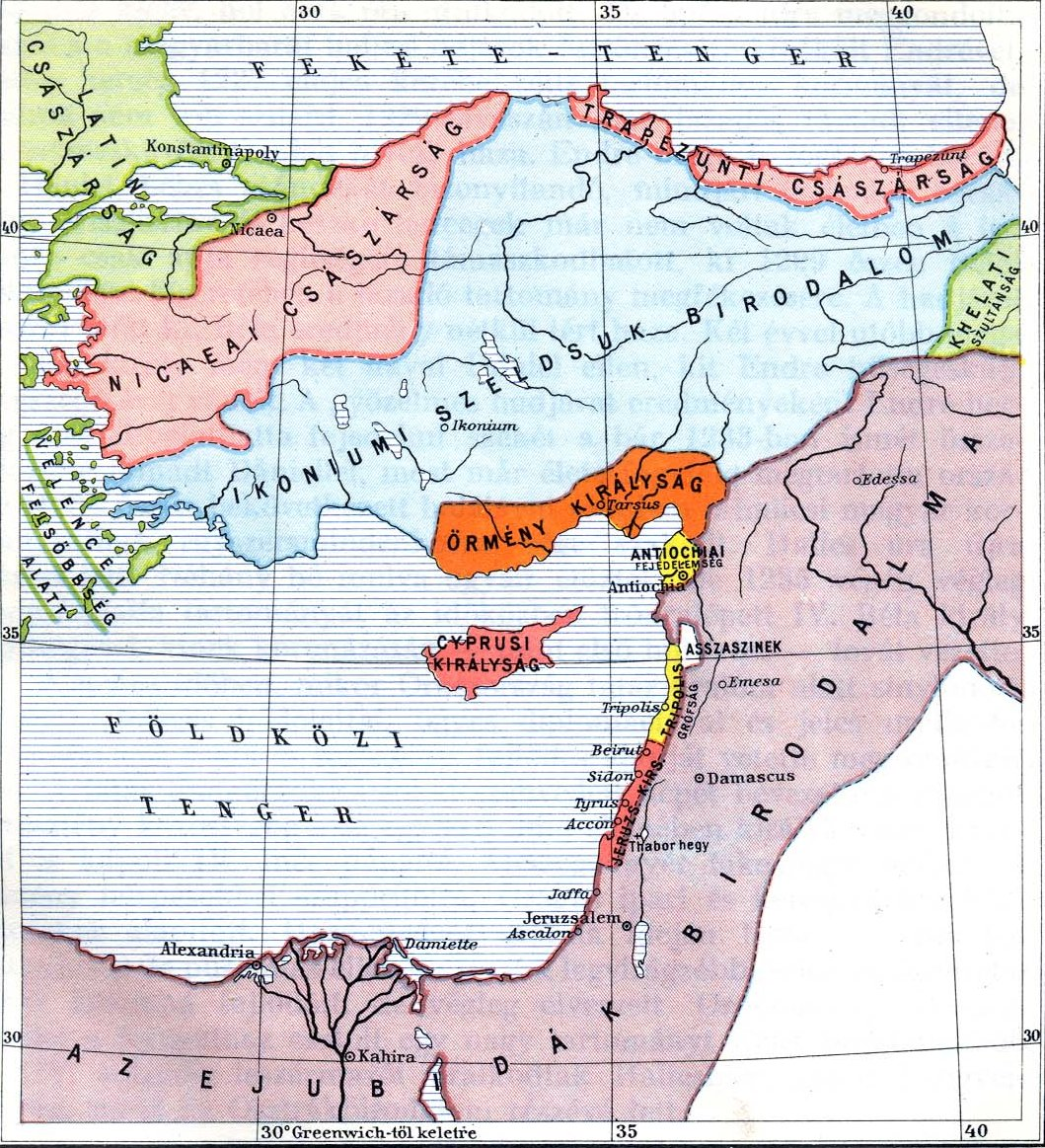
Map of Anatolia and the Levant in 1218

=== The Crusades and their effects ===
The four Crusades that involved the Byzantines severely weakened their power, and led to a disunity that would never be successfully restored.

=== Mongol invasion and aftermath ===
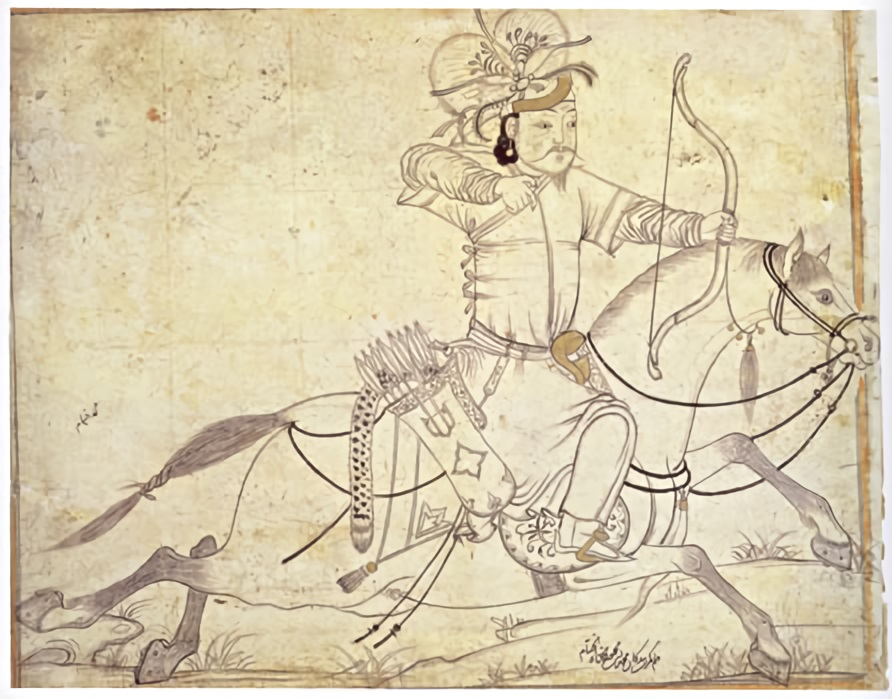
A Ilkanid horse archer in the 13th century

On June 26, 1243, the Seljuk armies were defeated by the Mongols in the Battle of Kosedag, and the Seljuk Sultanate of Rûm became a vassal of the Mongols. This caused the Seljuks to lose their power. Hulegu Khan, grandson of Genghis Khan founded the Ilkhanate in the southwestern part of the Mongol Empire. The Ilkhanate ruled Anatolia through Mongol military governors. The last Seljuk sultan Mesud II, died in 1308. The Mongol invasion of Transoxiana, Iran, Azerbaijan and Anatolia caused Turkomens to move to Western Anatolia. The Turkomens founded some Anatolian principalities (beyliks) under the Mongol dominion in Turkey. The most powerful beyliks were the Karamanids and the Germiyanids in the central area. Along the Aegean coast, from north to south, stretched Karasids, Sarukhanids, Aydinids, Menteşe and Teke principalities. The Jandarids (later called Isfendiyarids) controlled the Black Sea region round Kastamonu and Sinop. The Beylik of the Ottoman Dynasty was situated in the northwest of Anatolia, around Söğüt, and it was a small and insignificant state at that time. The Ottoman beylik would, however, evolve into the Ottoman Empire over the next 200 years, expanding throughout the Balkans, Anatolia.

=== Breakaway successor states and the fall ===
The newly forming states of the Turks gradually squeezed the empire so much that it was only a matter of time before Constantinople was taken in 1453.

== See also ==
- History of Turkey
- History of the Middle East
- Timeline of Middle Eastern history
- Anatolianism
- Anatolian peoples
- Anatolian hypothesis

== Sources ==
- Akurgal, Ekrem (2001). The Hattian and Hittite Civilizations. Ankara: Ministry of Culture. ISBN 978-9751727565. Archived from the original on 2023-01-15.
- Archi, Alfonso (2010). "When Did the Hittites Begin to Write in Hittite?". Pax Hethitica: Studies on the Hittites and Their Neighbours in Honour of Itamar Singer. Wiesbaden: Harrassowitz Verlag. pp. 37–46. ISBN 978-3447061193. Archived from the original on 2023-01-15.
- Barjamovic, Gojko (2011). A Historical Geography of Anatolia in the Old Assyrian Colony Period. Copenhagen: Museum Tusculanum Press. ISBN 978-8763536455. Archived from the original on 2023-01-15.
- Bevan, Edwyn Robert (1902). The House of Seleucus. E. Arnold.
- Botsford, George Willis (1922). Hellenic History. The Macmillan Company.
- Bryce, Trevor R. (2005) [1998]. The Kingdom of the Hittites (2nd revised ed.). New York: Oxford University Press. ISBN 978-0199279081. Archived from the original on 2023-01-15.
- Bryce, Trevor R. (2009). The Routledge Handbook of the Peoples and Places of Ancient Western Asia: The Near East from the Early Bronze Age to the fall of the Persian Empire. London & New York: Routledge. ISBN 978-1134159079.
- Bryce, Trevor R. (2012). The World of The Neo-Hittite Kingdoms: A Political and Military History. New York: Oxford University Press. ISBN 978-0191505027. Archived from the original on 2023-01-15.
- Bury, John Bagnell (1913). A History of Greece to the Death of Alexander the Great. Macmillan.
- Cooper, Eric; Decker, Michael J. (24 July 2012). Life and Society in Byzantine Cappadocia. Springer. ISBN 978-1-137-02964-5.
- Duncker, Max (1879). The History of Antiquity, Volume III. Richard Bentley & Son.
- Forlanini, Massimo (2010). "An Attempt at Reconstructing the Branches of the Hittite Royal Family of the Early Kingdom Period". Pax Hethitica: Studies on the Hittites and Their Neighbours in Honour of Itamar Singer. Wiesbaden: Harrassowitz Verlag. pp. 115–35. ISBN 978-3447061193. Archived from the original on 2023-01-15.
- Freeman, Charles (1999). Egypt, Greece and Rome: Civilizations of the Ancient Mediterranean. Oxford University Press. ISBN 0198721943.
- Gilan, Amir (2010). "Epic and History in Hittite Anatolia: In Search of a Local Hero". Epic and History. Chichester: John Wiley & Sons. pp. 51–65. ISBN 978-1444315646. Archived from the original on 2023-01-15.
- Gilan, Amir (2018). "In Search of a Distant Past: Forms of Historical Consciousness in Hittite Anatolia" (PDF). Anadolu. 44: 1–23. Archived (PDF) from the original on 2021-03-20.
- Greenfield, Jonas C. (1998). "Arameans and Aramaic in Anatolia". XXXIVème Rencontre assyriologique internationale. Ankara: Türk Tarih Kurumu Basımevi. pp. 199–207.
- Hawkins, John David (1982). "The Neo-Hittite States in Syria and Anatolia". The Cambridge Ancient History. Vol. 3. Cambridge: Cambridge University Press. pp. 372–441. ISBN 978-0521224963. Archived from the original on 2023-01-15.
- Hawkins, John David (1986). "Writing in Anatolia: Imported and Indigenous Systems". World Archaeology. 17 (3): 363–76. doi:10.1080/00438243.1986.9979976. JSTOR 124701. Archived from the original on 2021-03-11.
- Hawkins, John David (1994). "The end of the Bronze age in Anatolia: New Light from Recent Discoveries". Anatolian Iron Ages. Vol. 3. London-Ankara: British Institute of Archeology at Ankara. pp. 91–94. ISBN 978-1912090693. Archived from the original on 2023-01-15.
- Hawkins, John David (1995). "The Political Geography of North Syria and South-East Anatolia in the Neo-Assyrian Period". Neo-Assyrian Geography. Roma: Università di Roma. pp. 87–101.
- Hornblower, Simon; Antony Spawforth (1996). The Oxford Classical Dictionary. Oxford University Press.
- Howard, Douglas A. (2016). The History of Turkey (2nd ed.). Santa Barbara, California: Greenwood. ISBN 978-1-4408-3466-0.
- Marek, Christian (2010), Geschichte Kleinasiens in der Antike C. H. Beck, Munich, ISBN 978-3406598531 (review: M. Weiskopf, Bryn Mawr Classical Review 2010.08.13 Archived 2010-10-12 at the Wayback Machine).
- McMahon, Gregory; Steadman, Sharon, eds. (2012). The Oxford Handbook of Ancient Anatolia: (10,000-323 BCE). Oxford University Press. doi:10.1093/oxfordhb/9780195376142.001.0001. ISBN 978-0-19-537614-2.
  - Harl, Kenneth W. "The Greeks in Anatolia: From the Migrations to Alexander the Great". In McMahon & Steadman (2012), pp. 752–774. doi:10.1093/oxfordhb/9780195376142.013.0034
- Mommsen, Theodor (1906). The History of Rome: The Provinces, from Caesar to Diocletian. Charles Scribner's Sons.
- Osborne, James F. (2014). "Settlement Planning and Urban Symbology in Syro-Anatolian Cities". Cambridge Archaeological Journal. 24 (2): 195–214. doi:10.1017/S0959774314000444. S2CID 162223877. Archived from the original on 2022-04-04.
- Osborne, James F. (2017). "Exploring the Lower Settlements of Iron Age Capitals in Anatolia and Syria". Antiquity. 91 (355): 90–107. doi:10.15184/aqy.2016.254. S2CID 164449885. Archived from the original on 2022-04-04.
- Osborne, James F. (2020). The Syro-Anatolian City-States: An Iron Age Culture. New York: Oxford University Press. ISBN 9780199315833. Archived from the original on 2023-01-15.
- Ramsay, W.M. (1904). The Letters to the Seven Churches of Asia. Hodder & Stoughton.
