= Kızılırmak Delta =

Wetland in northern Turkey

- Kızılırmak Deltası
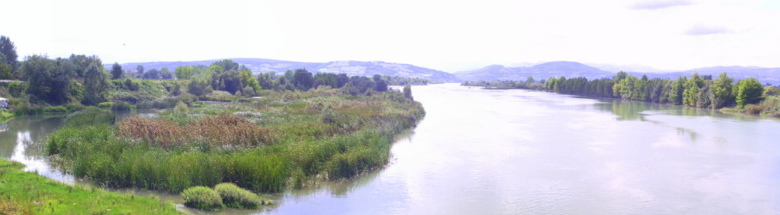
- The delta from a bridge over the river

- Location within Turkey
- Location: Samsun Province, Black Sea Region, Turkey
- Nearest town: Bafra
- Coordinates: 41°39′N 36°3′E
- Area: 560 km^{2} (220 sq mi)
- Website: samsun.ktb.gov.tr/TR-216809/kus-cenneti.html

Ramsar Wetland
- Official name: Kizilirmak Delta
- Designated: 15 April 1998
- Reference no.: 942

The Kızılırmak River's delta in northern Turkey is the third largest in the country. Formed where the river flows into the Black Sea, the delta has the biggest wetland in the region, with many coastal lagoons. The wetland is a key biodiversity area and the most important Ramsar site in Turkey.

With more than 500 kinds of plants and three-quarters of Turkey's bird species, the delta's reserve lets migrating birds rest and feed after the Black Sea crossing. Water buffalo provide milk and meat. The reserve is popular with tourists, particularly on weekends.

The land is some of the most fertile in Turkey: more than half is farmed. The town of Bafra on the delta and the nearby coastal city of Samsun made money from tobacco farming in the 19th and 20th centuries, but in the 2020s the main crop is rice.

The river was channelized near its mouth in the 2010s, which reduced bird habitat. The ecology of the delta is being damaged, such as by eutrophication of some lakes due to fertilizer in water running off fields. The coastline is receding because sediment is caught in upstream dams, and this is forecast to continue. There is a management plan for the delta until 2034, but it is not widely available. (Note: Countries must plan for their Ramsar sites but are only encouraged to publish)

== History ==
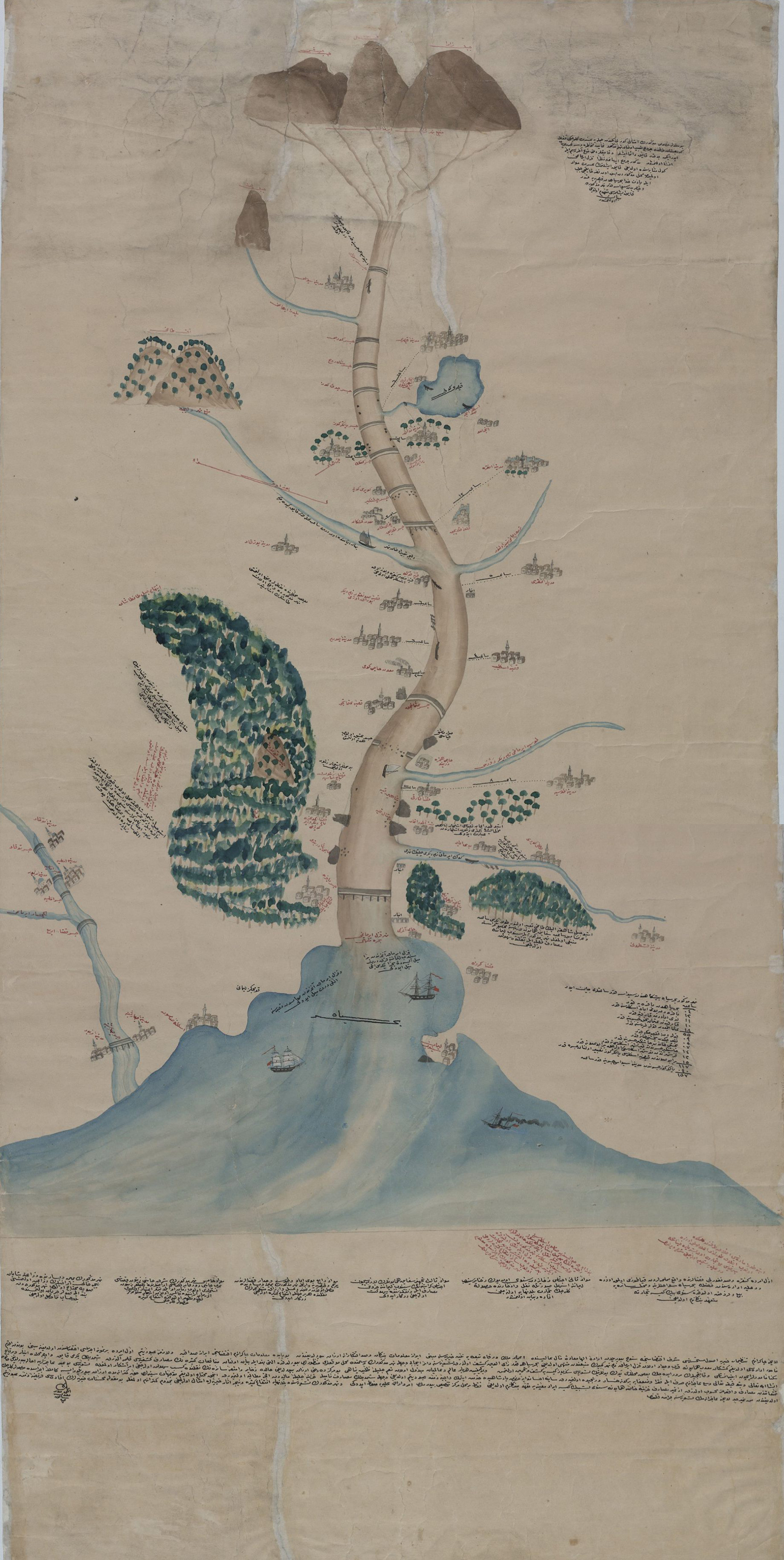
Ottoman map of the delta

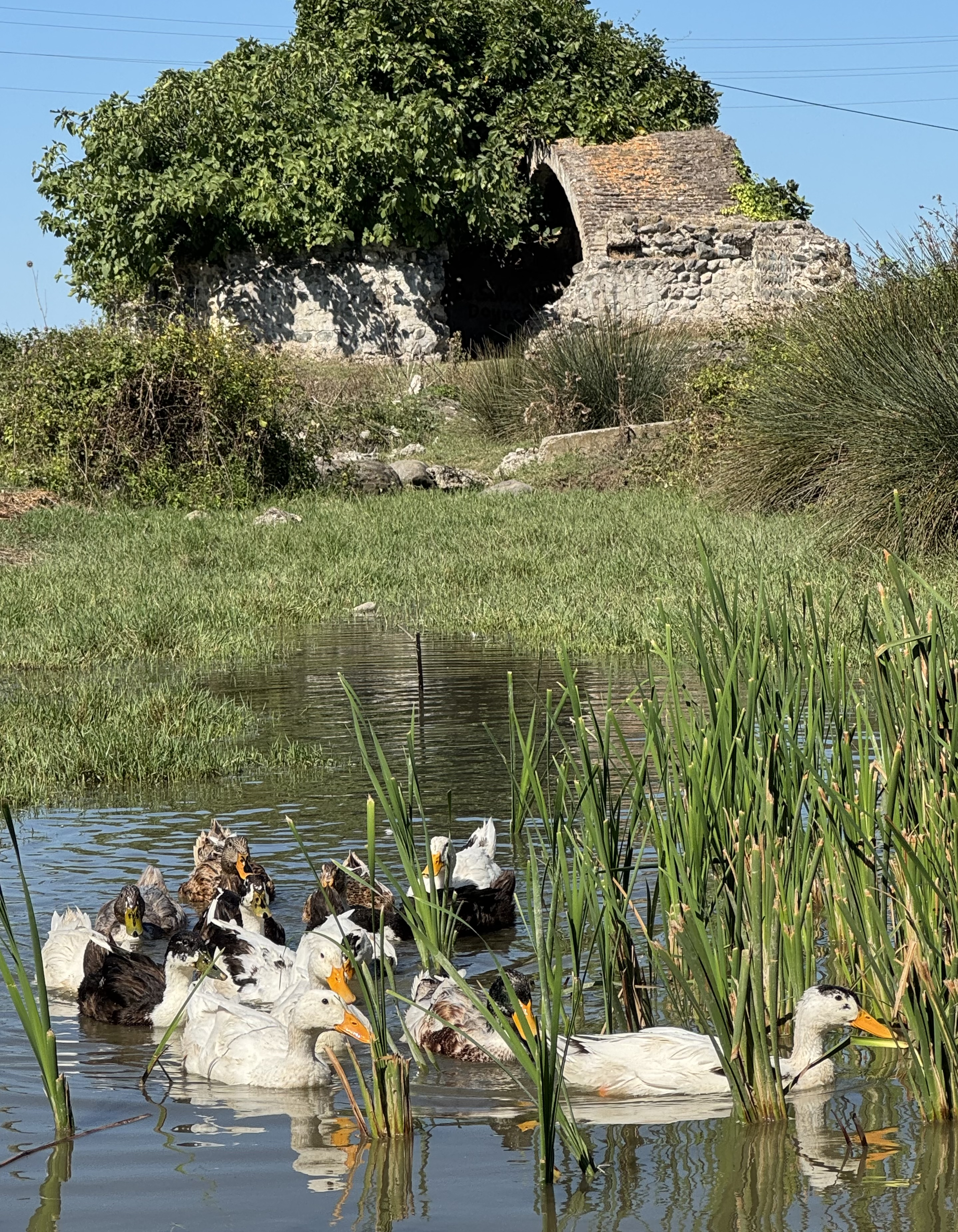
Churches fell into ruin after the population exchange.

A little more than 2000 years ago Greek geographer Strabo described the plains east of the mouth of the river around the town of Gadilon as abundant in fruit, deer, gazelle, and soft-wooled sheep. During the rule of the Ottoman Empire and the early years of the Republic of Türkiye, malaria was widespread in the marshes, and the delta was occupied seasonally. Meanwhile, the higher lands above the delta supported tobacco and hazelnut farming. Tobacco cultivation continued into the 20th century, and Bafra has a tobacco museum to preserve this heritage.

As in some other parts of the country, much of the population was forcibly exchanged between Greece and Turkey in the early 20th century. After the dissolution of the Ottoman Empire, which saw the loss of land for the Turkish state, malaria hindered attempts to resettle migrants from the lost land (for example by killing people who had moved from Circassia); water drainage efforts began in the 1960s to combat mosquitos and provide agricultural land for migrants from Circassia and Turkey's eastern Black Sea region. Roma also grew tobacco in the delta. Members of the Yörük ethnic group settled the delta in the early 20th century and raised camels there until the 1990s. Several Yörük villages exist in the delta, including Yörükler in 19 Mayıs.

Water drainage efforts allowed rice production in the delta to expand and become the delta's dominant crop. Many peasants moved to the delta in the second half of the 20th century. State Hydraulic Works, a state agency, became responsible for managing wetlands in the mid-20th century. Encouraged by the government, some of the delta's woodlands were felled in the 1950s and 1960s to make space for agriculture and search for oil. Dams built on the Kızılırmak, such as the Altınkaya Dam in 1988 and the Derbent Dam in 1990, prevented the lower delta from flooding and allowed for more agriculture on the former floodplains. Soil lost upriver due to deforestation and agriculture had been expanding the delta. However, the dams reduced annual sedimentation from 23 million tonnes to about 300 thousand tonnes, increasing the effects of erosion due to the loss of sediments, especially on the eastern side.

In the late 20th century, the ecological value of the marshes was recognized, and attempts to protect them began, although residents opposed restrictions on agriculture and building. In 1998, the marshes were designated a Ramsar site. Some illegally-built holiday homes were demolished by the Samsun Council in 2015. In 2016 Turkey nominated the wetland as a World Heritage Site: although it did not meet the International Union for Conservation of Nature criteria, as of 2025 Turkey has kept it on the tentative list. (Note: UNESCO encourages countries to revise their lists at least every 10 years) Since 2017, hunting has been banned in part of the delta. Between 2014 and 2019, the last 6 km of the river before its mouth were channalized, which caused habitat fragmentation and loss.

Traditionally, clean water and certain plants and animals were considered sacred, and there were restrictions on the times and manners in which certain organisms could be killed. Various festivals were held, including a stork festival, a festival for the spring release of water buffaloes, and a sheep breeding festival. These beliefs and practices, though prevalent among older residents, have largely not been passed to the younger generations.

== Geography ==
The Kızılırmak is the longest river entirely within Turkey and has the country's second largest drainage basin. The delta covers an area of about 56,000 hectares, of which 11,600 are wetland ecosystems and related habitats, north of the Black Sea coastal road in the Ondokuz Mayıs, Bafra and Alaçam districts. Bafra (80% of the district is in the delta) – which has about 150,000 people – is the largest of the three municipalities located in the delta; the other two are 19 Mayıs (15%) and Alaçam (5%). In addition to these three towns, more than 30 villages are located in the delta. Most of the plain is used for agriculture. From 2010 to 2020, water surface and built-upon areas increased, and the amount of arable land decreased.

In the past half million years, the North Anatolian Fault has pushed up the southern part of the delta, and changes in climate and sea level have created an alternating cycle of lagoons and lakes in the eastern portion. A canyon cut into the previous delta platform during the Last Glacial Period has filled, and the delta is now a plain. For the past 545,000 years, tectonic processes have pushed the delta plain upward at about 0.28 mm per year; terraces then at sea level have been raised to 120 m above the present sea level. The present delta was not formed until the Holocene. As the delta continues to be uplifted, the region occasionally experiences minor earthquakes, though some larger quakes have occurred offshore. A 2010 study showed the coastline had advanced some time in the past, but as of 2023 it is retreating on average, mainly because dams built upstream (such as Altınkaya and Derbent) have reduced the amount of sediment coming down the river. The Yörükler coast accreted at less than half the rate the coast near Lake Liman eroded. Most of the delta's soil is hydromorphic alluvium, either Cambisol or Kastanozem, and there are dunes on the coast.

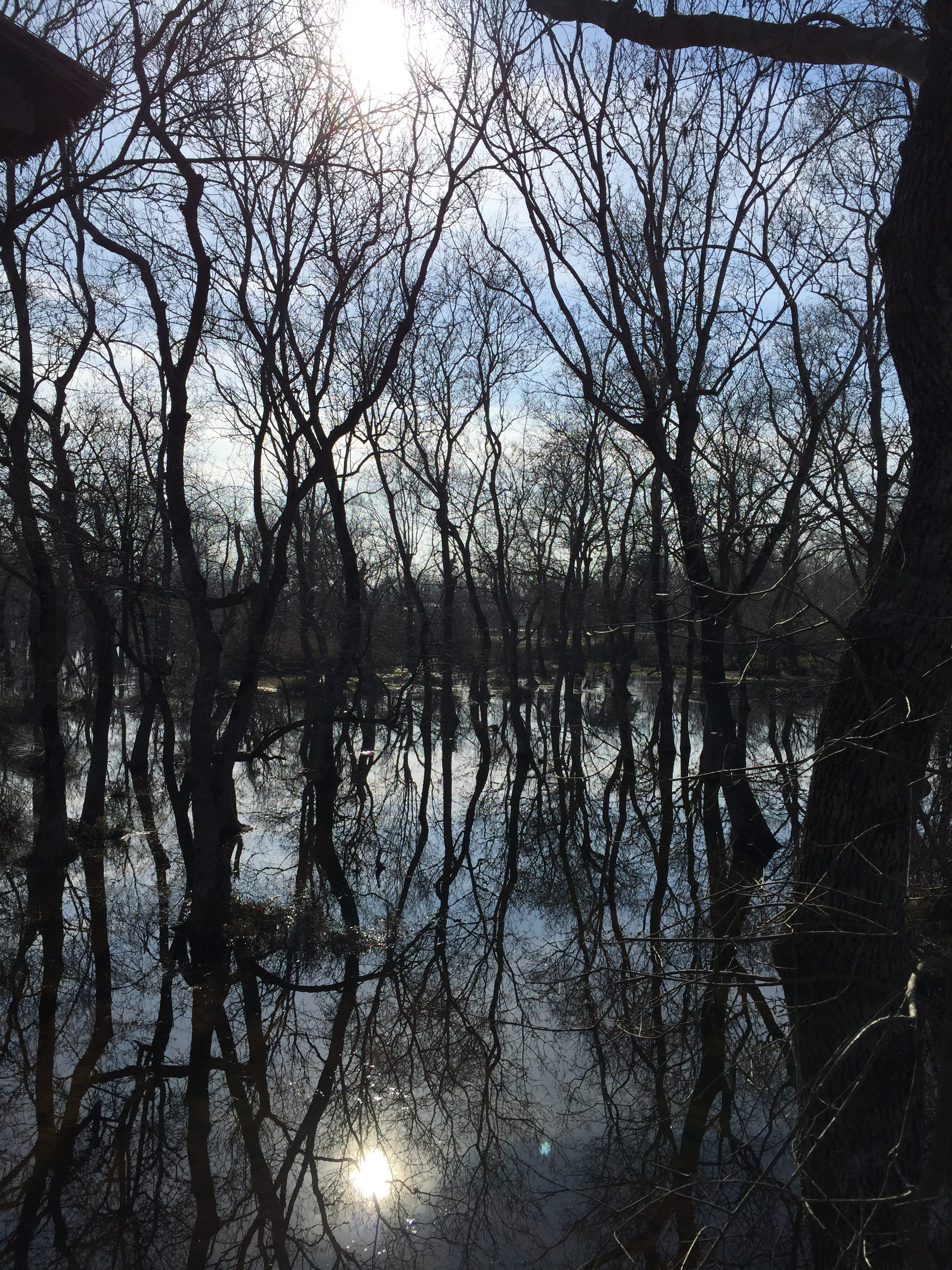
Lake Balık, one of the delta's major lakes

There are more than 20 lakes, which are 1.5 m deep on average but twice as deep in spring, when their surface area can exceed 9,000 hectares. The Tatlı and Gıcı lakes are freshwater; the rest are brackish. Some of the lakes are eutrophic due to agricultural pollution. Thirty channels drain agricultural land. Groundwater flows northeast, north, and northwest freely through the delta's aquifer. An excess of calcium – caused by natural weathering of rocks and overuse of certain fertilisers, such as agricultural lime – has made water in the northeast part unsuitable for drinking.

The climate is temperate, with hot and dry summers, warm and wet winters, and foggy and rainy springs. Rainfall averages 719 mm per year, and temperature 13.7 °C. The wind usually blows from the west, which has shaped the delta such that most of the marshland is in the eastern part of the delta.

== Ecology ==
Wetland ecosystems, almost all of them, cover 21,700 hectares. Its habitats are classified in the European Nature Information System as 37% constant coastal dunes with grass, 3% coastal dune bushes, 11% permanent mesotrophic lakes and ponds, 1% wide reed beds, 26% Juncus marshes, 3% humid or wet eutrophic and mesotrophic meadows, 5% flooded forests, 1% thermophilic deciduous forests, and 11% mixed market gardens and agricultural sites. The delta is designated as an Important Bird Area, Important Plant Area and Key Biodiversity Area.

=== Flora ===
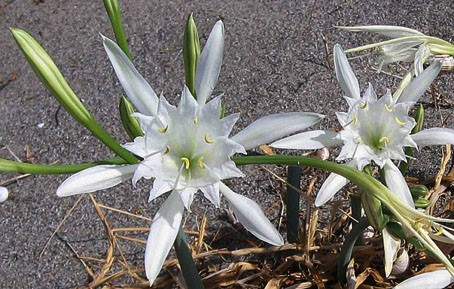
Sea daffodils, which are endangered in Turkey, grow on the dunes.

The delta is home to more than 500 plant species. Seagrass is a rather important species in the marine wetlands. Lagoons with a higher salt concentration have less volume of phytoplankton and fewer phytoplankton species than their less salty counterparts. When the lake water recedes in the summer, knotgrass grows and is eaten by water buffalo.

Dunes further from the coast have a greater variety of plant species. Larger dunes tend to develop relatively far from the coast on the west side of the delta; these dunes are dominated by grasses and various bushes, including the coniferous prickly juniper. Herds of sheep have damaged plants in the dunes on the east side of the river between Lake Cernek and the coast. Extract of searocket collected in the delta have been analysed and show the species may have therapeutic potential.

=== Fauna ===
The Eurasian otter lives in the river, but numbers decreased due to the channelization. About 12,000 water buffalo inhabit the delta, many of which have been branded and are set free to roam in the summer. Marsh frogs climb on them to catch flies, and up to 20 frogs can be found on a single buffalo. There are about 450 feral horses.

Reptile species found in the delta include the Greek tortoise, European pond turtle, European green lizard, Balkan green lizard, European cat snake, Caspian whipsnake, dice snake, and horned viper. Of the nine species of amphibians found in the delta, two species are salamanders and seven species are frogs. These include the southern crested newt, European green toad, European tree frog, eastern spadefoot toad, agile frog, and Uludağ frog.

The species status of sturgeon in the estuary is unclear, but they may still attempt to migrate upstream. Fifteen species of freshwater snails inhabit the delta. Invasive Prussian carp have disrupted the native fishes and are avoided by fishers. Other invasive aquatic species include mosquitofish (both eastern and western), topmouth gudgeon, and warty comb jelly. There is a wild animals first aid unit. Breakwaters created where there was formerly sand created new habitat for shellfish such as barnacles, limpets and bivalves.

==== Birds ====
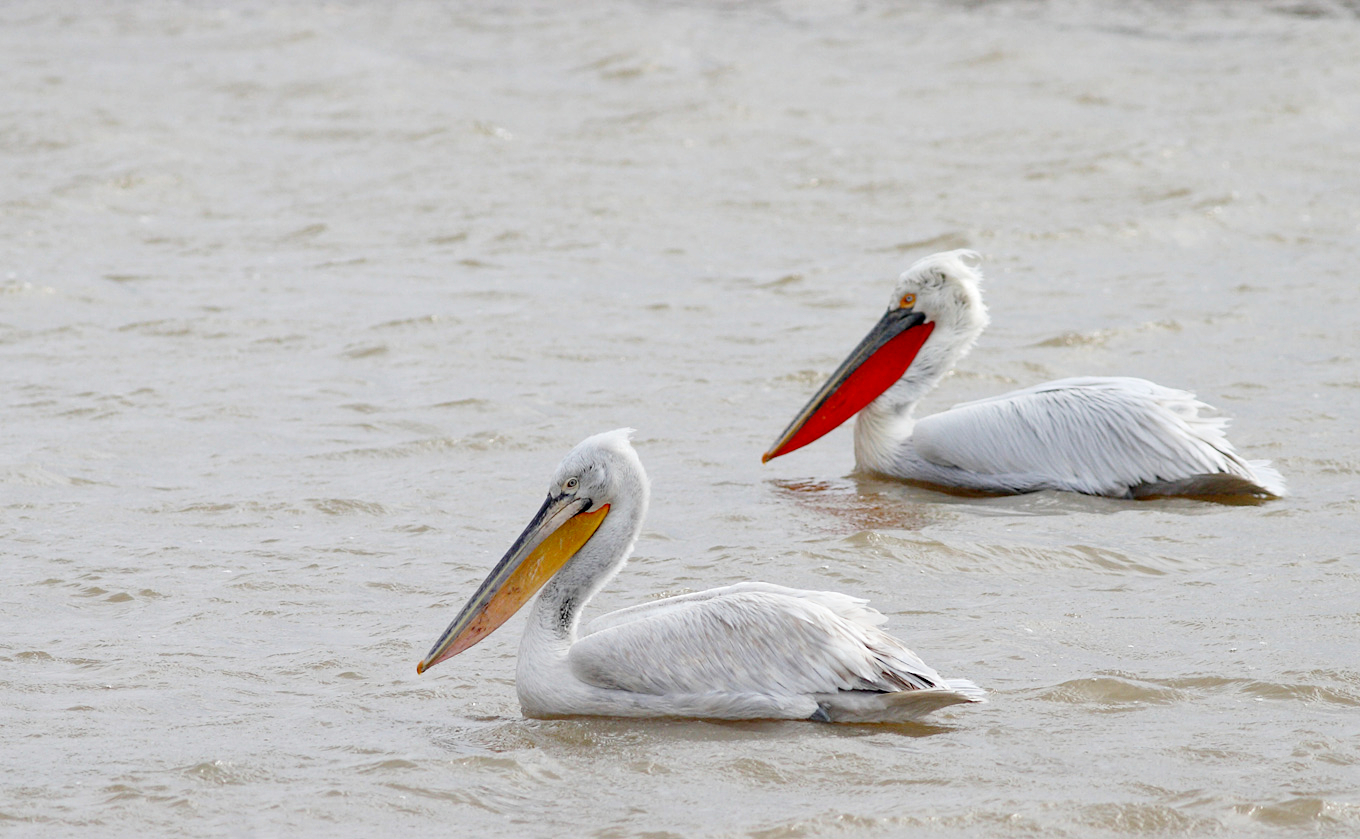
Dalmatian pelican

The delta is important for birds crossing the Black Sea, and three-quarters of bird species in Turkey have been recorded in the delta. About 950 pairs of white storks migrate to Africa and return to breed in the delta, and their numbers are increasing. Although elsewhere storks commonly nest on manmade structures such as electricity pylons, in the delta almost all nest in trees. Rather than their usual migration to Mozambique, Kenya or Egypt, storks which are injured or cannot fly can survive year-round in the delta. Other birds species in the region include the grey-headed swamphen and the great egret. Birds are ringed during both the spring and autumn migrations, but mostly during the autumn, as they need longer to rest due to coming over Black Sea and returning with young. Birds are ringed at the Cernek Ringing Station and Ondokuz Mayıs University's bird research center, which has ringed 165 thousand birds from 175 species. 23 years of ringing has shown that climate change is affecting migration timing. The university's two bird watching towers are open to visitors. Several bird species decreased due to channalization of the river.

== Management ==
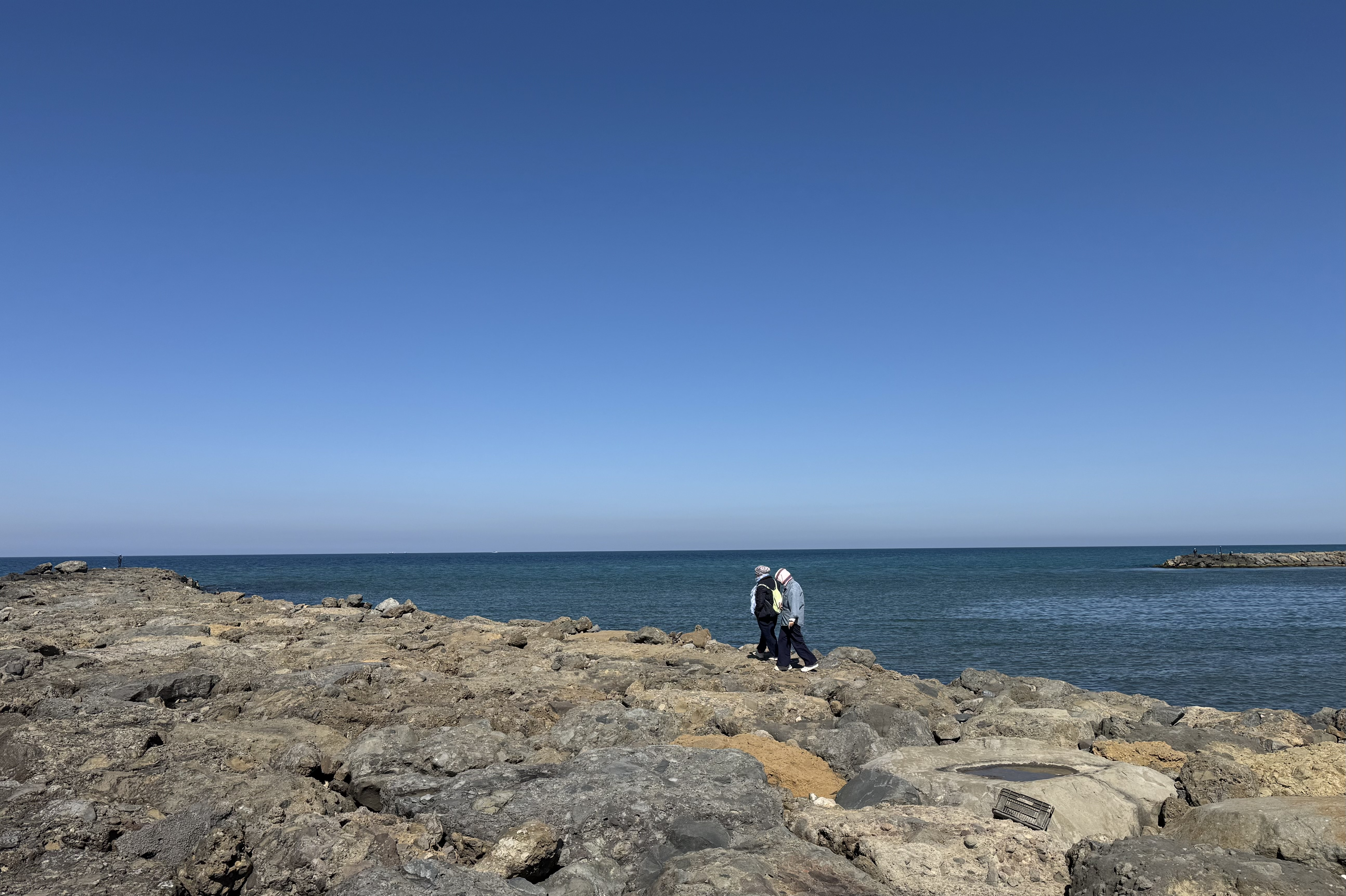
I and Y shaped groynes at the mouth of the Kızılırmak were constructed to reduce erosion of the coastline east of the river mouth, which was caused by reduced sediment due to dams.

The management plan for 2025–2034 is available at the Samsun office of the national park management part of the Ministry of Agriculture and Forestry, and there is a local wetlands commission. A protection and monitoring project runs from 2024 to mid-2028, with 6 people employed to protect the reserve. It is proposed to be made a Special Environmental Protection Area.

In the late 2010s, experts issued a management plan for the delta but could not agree with residents on what should be done. In 2012 the delta was a pilot site for more effective management of Ramsar sites in Turkey. The 2017–2023 management plan called for sub-plans to manage water, visitors, grazing and aquaculture. A buffer zone was created around the strictly protected area. Land within the region was classified by whether it is owned by individuals, owned by the government, or disputed. Several government departments were responsible, which might have caused confusion. In 2020 it was registered as a "sensitive area to be strictly protected". A plan for some coastal protection of Liman Lagoon was published in 2019. In October 2023, a strategic environmental assessment drought plan was released for the river basin.

Academics have called for possible sea level rise to be planned for. In 2025 Doğa, a conservationist organization in Turkey, is checking all Key Biodiversity Areas in Turkey; the delta was last assessed in 2004. The European Union is funding a "coastal city living lab", and ecosystem-based adaptations that might be considered include floodplain enlargement and restoration of dunes and seagrass meadows. A year-long project for young farmers to receive training in sustainable agriculture began in 2025. Some traditional practices help with environmental management, for example water buffalo and fishing boats help keep the connections between the lakes open.

=== Agriculture ===
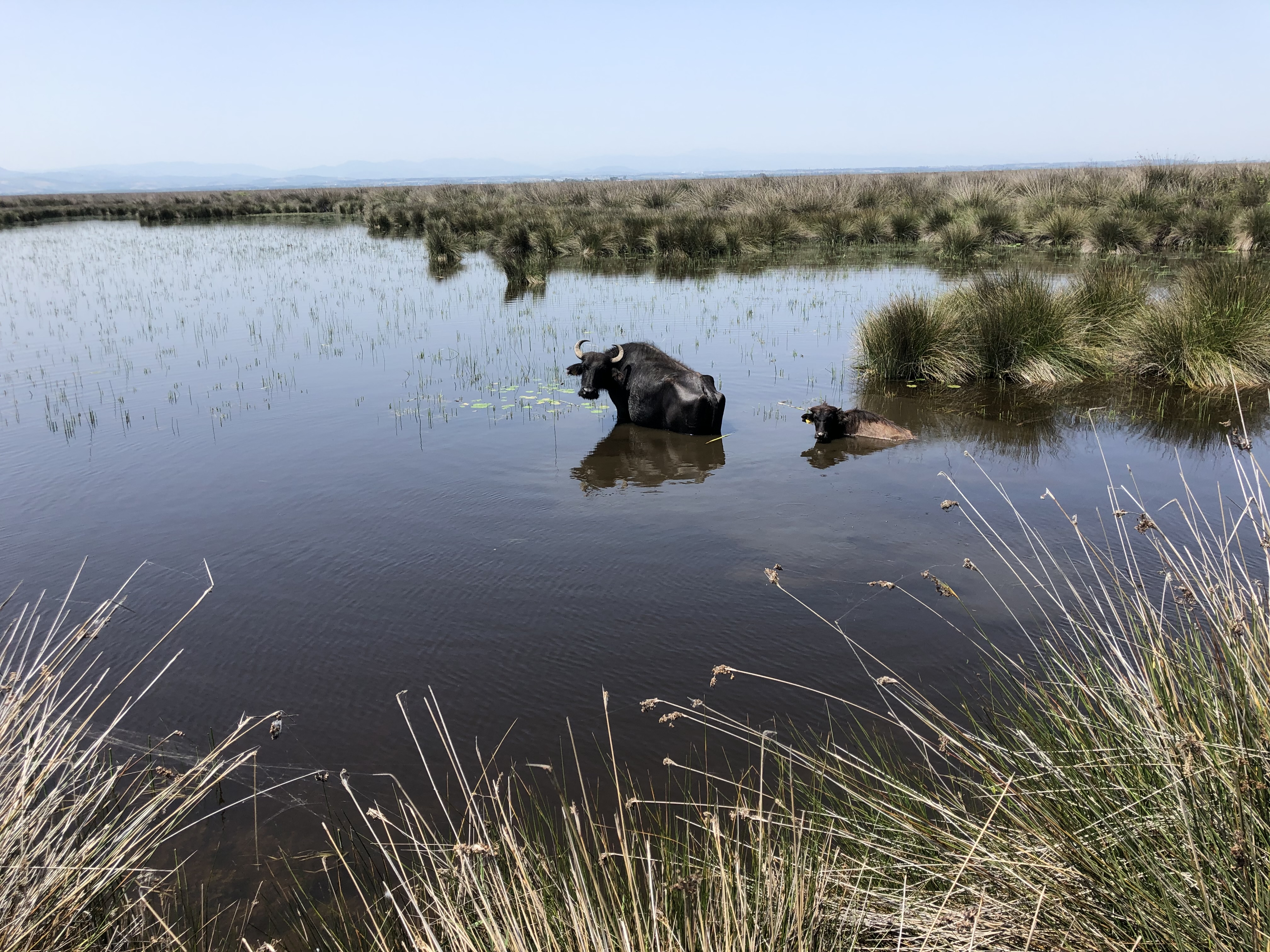
Water buffaloes

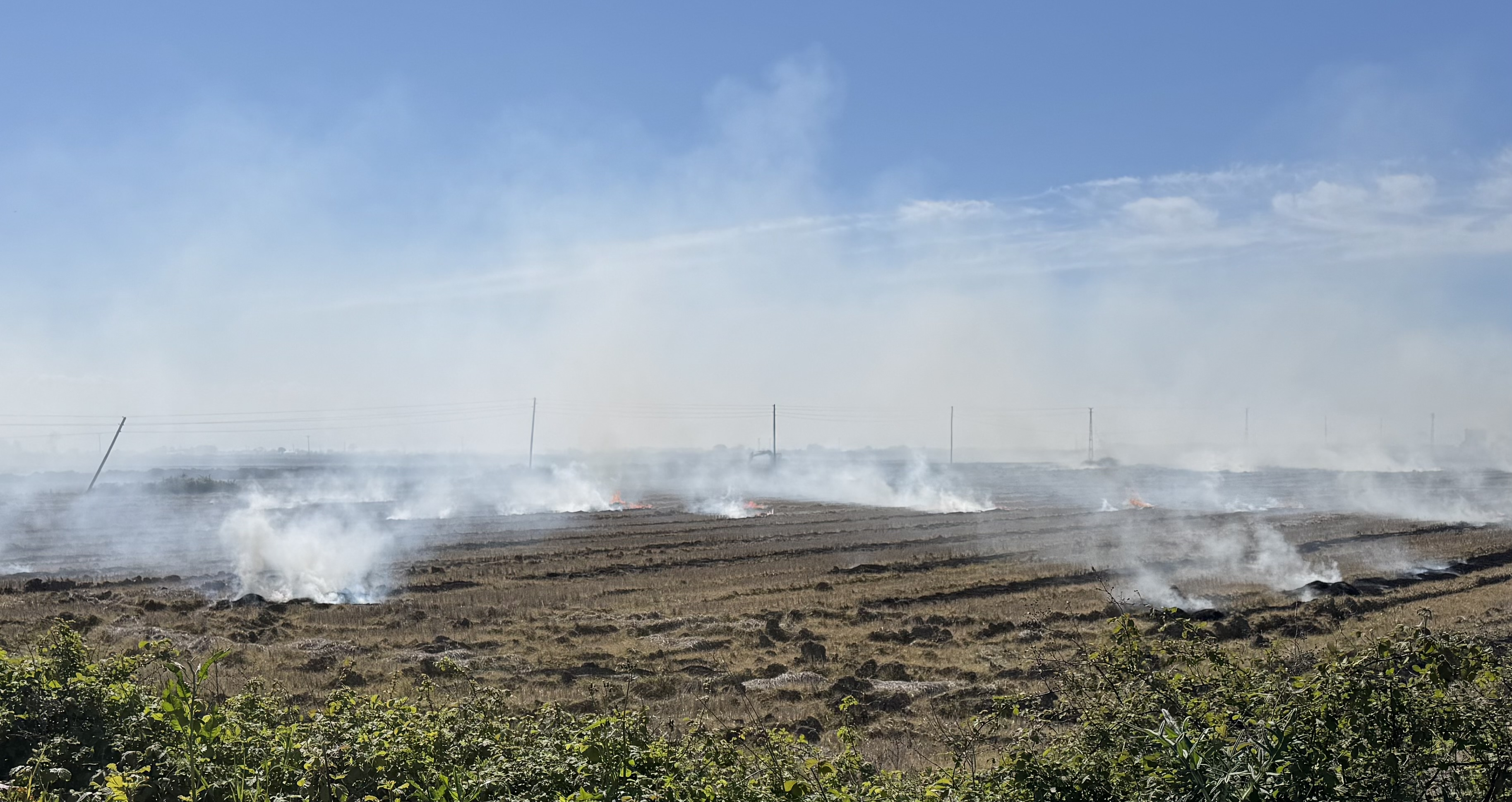
Stubble burning is illegal and bad for birds.

The delta is one of the most fertile plains for agriculture in Turkey. Rice is the most important crop, but its water-intensive cultivation takes water away from water buffaloes, aquatic species, and other crops. Chemicals in rice runoff water have affected plants and animals, such as by nutrient pollution.

Vegetables and other grains are also grown. Some farmers lease land from the government and irrigation and fishing is managed by co-operatives and there are permits for reed cutting. The delta is also a source of cut reeds and medicinal leeches. A study of meadow plants found that grazing affects "not only species composition but also functional diversity through strategic flexibility within the same species".

Meat from buffalo in the delta is used in sujuk sausages, and people have tried to breed buffalo which produce more meat. To vary the gene pool (to reduce negative genetic effects) some buffalo were artificially inseminated with sperm from Italy, and extra males were brought from Kandira in 2025. A project due to be completed in 2026 aims to restore grassland by having the buffalo eat juncus reeds to restore nesting areas for grassland nesting birds such as northern lapwings.

=== Fishing ===
Lake fishing is regulated by local offices of the Agriculture Ministry, with three cooperatives being the only fishers allowed. They catch carp, mullet, zander and Turkish crayfish. Young carp were released into a lake in 2025 to be fished. Several non-native aquatic species, some of which have economic value, have been introduced into the delta's lakes and nearby sea. Of these introduced species, so-iuy mullet has a relatively small ecological impact but is valuable to fishers. Veined rapa whelk, an invasive shellfish, is dredged from the sea around Samsun and exported to the Far East. In the 2010s new construction made the river mouth easier for fishing boats to shelter in.

=== Tourism ===
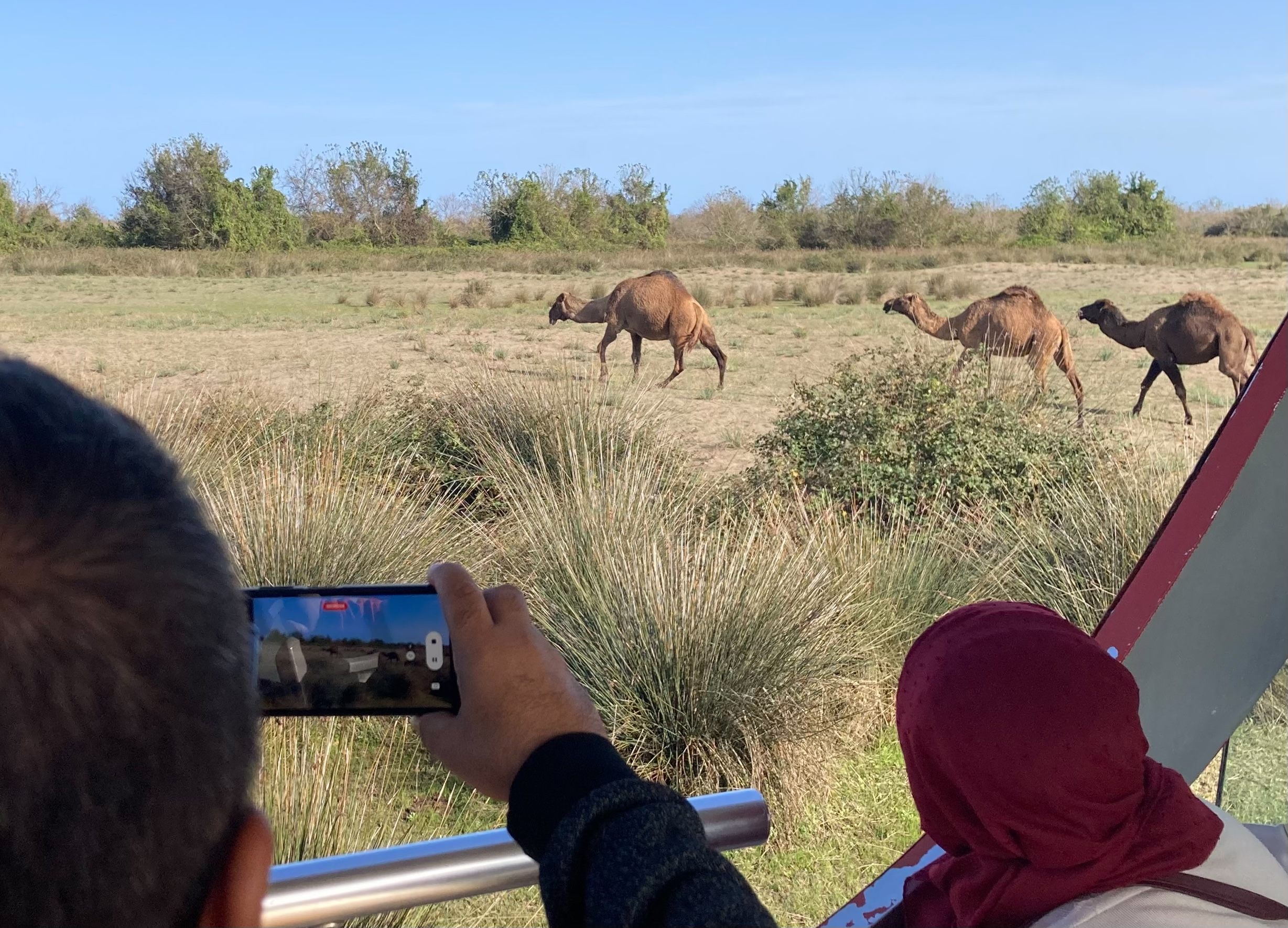
Tourists on open-top bus. Camels are released by locals at certain times of year.

About 100,000 people visit the delta each year. Rural tourism activities (which is included in the Samsun tourism master plan 2024 to 2028) include walking, enjoying the landscape, photography, picnicking, cycling and watching wildlife. A 2019 study said that with over 50 km of beach ecotourism could be expanded. Botanical tourism has also been suggested. Most people questioned by the study associated the Kızılırmak Delta with wetlands, agriculture, being one of the largest deltas of Turkey, being Turkey's largest river, fertile lands, and fertile fields. More than 70% had not heard of the Ramsar site designation, and more than 70% thought wetlands are at risk of climate change.

=== Threats ===
The ecology of the delta is being damaged by eutrophication of some lakes due to fertilizer in water running off fields.

A 2020 study found sewage in drainage channels. Calcium and magnesium levels in the groundwater exceed the limits set by the World Health Organization. Additionally, pumping of groundwater has caused seawater intrusion, which prompted academics in 2021 to call for such pumping to be stopped. Although prohibited in Ramsar sites, illegal sand extraction was still occurring as of 2015; construction of groynes only halted coastal erosion in some places. From 1984 to 2022, coastal retreat averaged seven meters per year partly due to sediment being caught in upstream dams, and this was expected to continue. In 2025, reeds were damaged by wildfires in Turkey. The river was channelized near its mouth in the 2010s, and some of the oxbow lakes from the former river bed are drying up. Lawsuits contesting agricultural use of some of this new land (which is now classified as "sensitive area to be strictly protected") continue as of 2024. Discharge from the Bafra Wastewater Treatment Plant is bad for the river. Fish migrating between sea and river have seriously decreased due to various human activities, such as pesticide water pollution.

Climate change has changed bird migrations: some birds (such as geese and swans) have become less common, while others (such as black storks) have begun wintering at the delta. Gendarmes are stationed to prevent illegal hunting. From the mid-1980s to the 2010s average temperature increased and average dry season water area decreased.
