= Kızılırmak River =

River in Turkey

Kızılırmak Halys
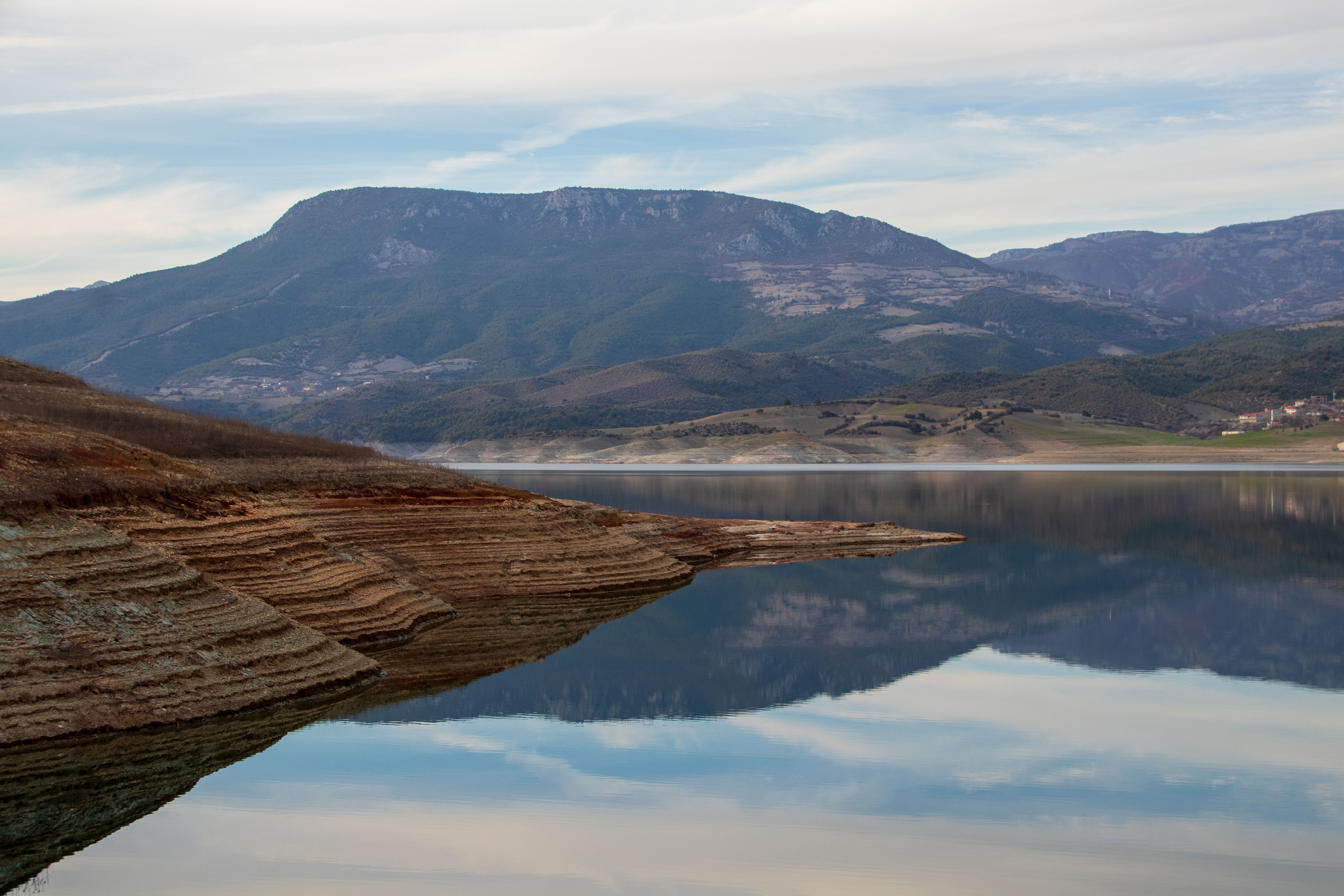
- Kızılırmak in Samsun

- Map of the Kızılırmak watershed

Location
- Country: Turkey
- Cities: Sivas, Kırşehir, Kırıkkale

Physical characteristics
- Source
  - location: İmranlı, Sivas Province
  - coordinates: 39°48′N 38°18′E
  - elevation: 2,000 m (6,600 ft)
- Mouth: Black Sea
  - location: Bafra, Samsun Province
  - coordinates: 41°44′04″N 35°57′23″E
  - elevation: 0 m (0 ft)
- Length: 1,355 km (842 mi)
- Discharge
  - average: 128 m^{3}/s

Basin features
- Tributaries
  - left: Devrez River, Gök River
  - right: Delice River

Ramsar Wetland
- Official name: Kizilirmak Delta
- Designated: April 15, 1998

The Kızılırmak (Turkish pronunciation: [kɯˈzɯɫɯɾmak], Turkish for "Red River"), historically known as the Halys River (Ancient Greek: Ἅλυς), is the longest river flowing entirely within Turkey. It is a source of hydroelectric power and is not used for navigation.

== Geography ==
The Kızılırmak flows for a total of 1,355 kilometres (842 mi), rising in Eastern Anatolia around 39.8°N 38.3°E, flowing first to the west and southwest until 38.7°N 34.8°E, then forming a wide arch, the "Halys bend", flowing first to the west, then to the northwest, passing to the northeast of Lake Tuz (Tuz Gölü in Turkish), then to the north and northeast, where it is joined by its major tributary, the Delice River (once known in Greek as the Cappadox river) at 40.47°N 34.14°E. After zigzagging to the northwest to the confluence with the Devrez River at 41.10°N 34.42°E, and back to the northeast, it joins the Gökırmak (Sky River in Turkish) before finally flowing via a wide delta into the Black Sea northwest of Samsun at 41.72°N 35.95°E.

=== Delta ===
The Kızılırmak River's delta in northern Turkey is the third largest in the country. Formed where the river flows into the Black Sea, the delta has the biggest wetland in the region, with many coastal lagoons. The wetland is a key biodiversity area and the most important Ramsar site in Turkey.

With more than 500 kinds of plants and three-quarters of Turkey's bird species, the delta's reserve lets migrating birds rest and feed after the Black Sea crossing. Water buffalo provide milk and meat. The reserve is popular with tourists, particularly on weekends.

The land is some of the most fertile in Turkey: more than half is farmed. The town of Bafra on the delta and the nearby coastal city of Samsun made money from tobacco farming in the 19th and 20th centuries, but in the 2020s the main crop is rice.

The river was channelized near its mouth in the 2010s, which reduced bird habitat. The ecology of the delta is being damaged, such as by eutrophication of some lakes due to fertilizer in water running off fields. The coastline is receding because sediment is caught in upstream dams, and this is forecast to continue. There is a management plan for the delta until 2034, but it is not widely available. (Note: Countries must plan for their Ramsar sites but are only encouraged to publish)

== History ==
The Hittites called the river the Maraššantiya, and it formed the western boundary of Hatti, the core land of the Hittite empire. Thales of Miletus is said to have used early engineering techniques to allow the Lydian army to cross the river.

Until the Roman conquest of Anatolia the Halys River (later renamed the Kızılırmak by the Turks) served as a natural political boundary in central Asia Minor, first between the kingdom of Lydia and the Persian Empire, and later between the Pontic Kingdom and the Kingdom of Cappadocia. As the site of the Battle of Halys, or the Battle of the Eclipse, on May 28, 585 BC, the river formed the border between Lydia to the west and Media to the east until Croesus of Lydia crossed it to attack Cyrus the Great in 547 BC. He was defeated and Persia expanded to the Aegean Sea.

In the 1st century AD Vespasian combined several provinces, including Cappadocia, to create one large province with its eastern boundary marked by the Euphrates River. This province once again splintered during Trajan's reign - the newly created province of Cappadocia, bounded by the Euphrates to the East, included Pontus and Lesser Armenia. The Halys River became an interior river and never regained its significance as a political border. In the 130s a governor of Cappadocia wrote: "long ago the Halys River was the boundary between the kingdom of Croesus and the Persian Empire; now it flows under Roman dominion."

== Dams and agriculture ==
The river's water is used to grow rice and in a few areas water buffalo are kept. There are dams on the river at Boyabat, Altınkaya and Derbent. Dams have reduced the flow of sediment to the delta, allowing coastal erosion.
