= Altınkaya Dam =

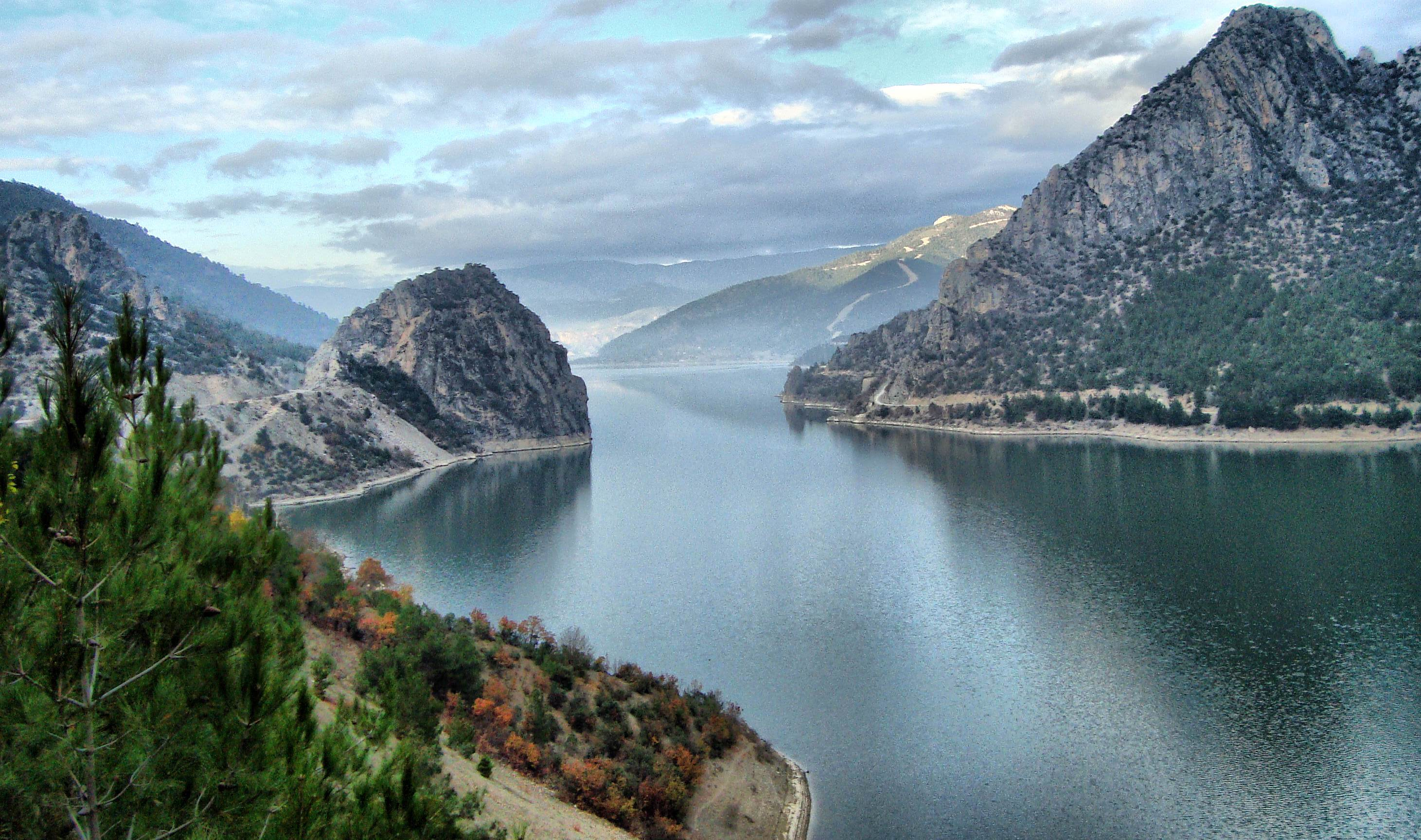
- Altınkaya Dam

- Location within Turkey
- Official name: Altınkaya Dam
- Location: Samsun Province, Turkey
- Coordinates: 41°21′49.08″N 35°43′28.43″E
- Construction began: 1980
- Opening date: 1988
- Operator: State Hydraulic Works (DSİ)

Dam and spillways
- Impounds: Kızılırmak
- Height: 195 m (640 ft)
- Length: 634 m (2,080 ft)

Reservoir
- Creates: Lake Altınkaya Dam

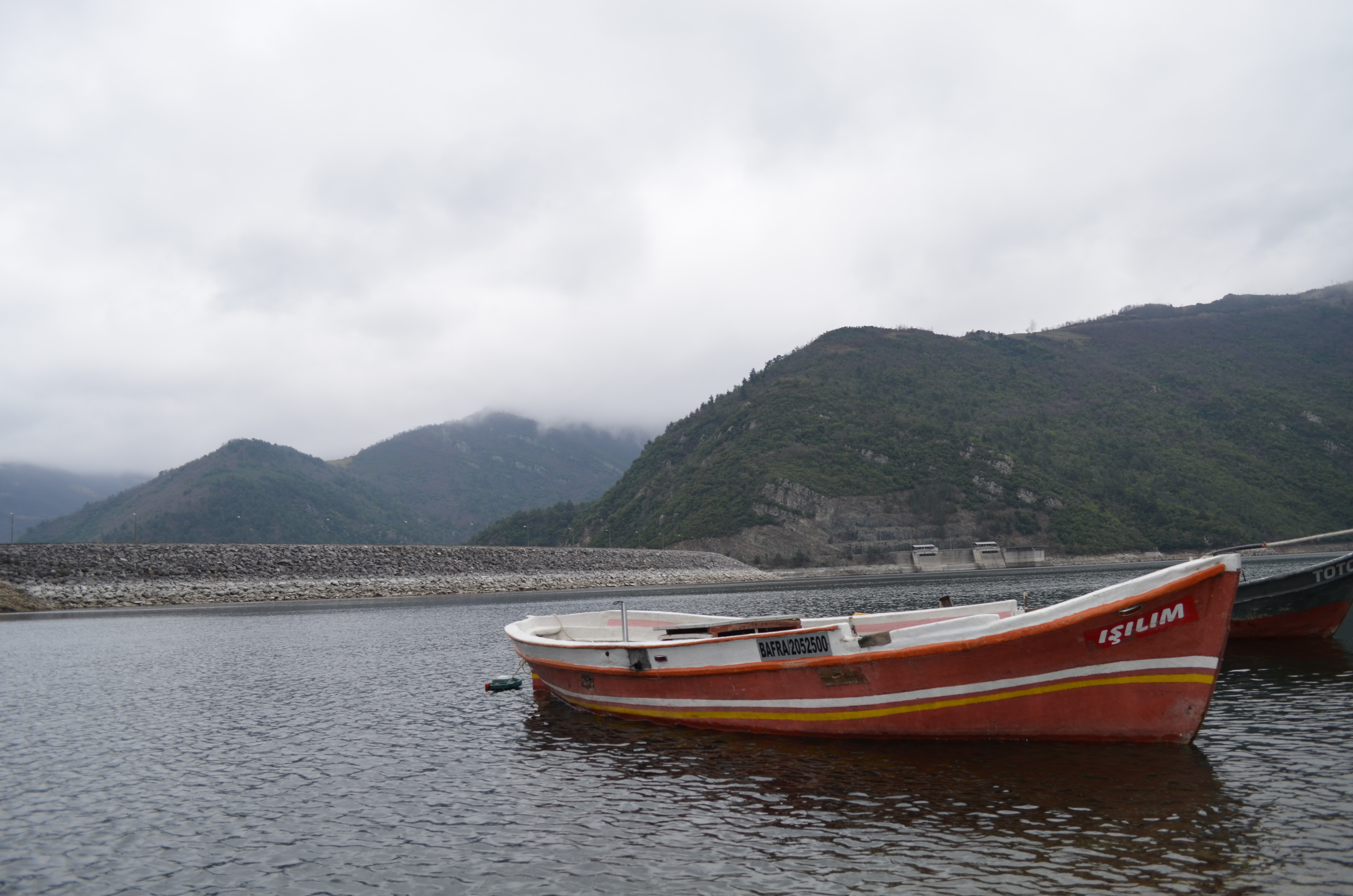
Altınkaya Dam

Altınkaya Dam is a rock-fill dam for irrigation and hydro power, on the River Kızılırmak, 23 km south of Bafra and 35 km west of Samsun in northern Turkey. It feeds Lake Derbent.

Having a dam volume of 15,920,000 m^{3}, Altınkaya Dam was completed in 1988. It has a storage volume of 5,763 billion m^{3} in a reservoir area at normal water surface elevation of 118 km^{2}.

Total power from the facility is 4 x 175 MW, for an installed capacity of 700 MW giving an annual electricity production of 1,630 GWh.

== See also ==
- Boyabat Dam - upstream
- Derbent Dam - downstream
