= Delice River =

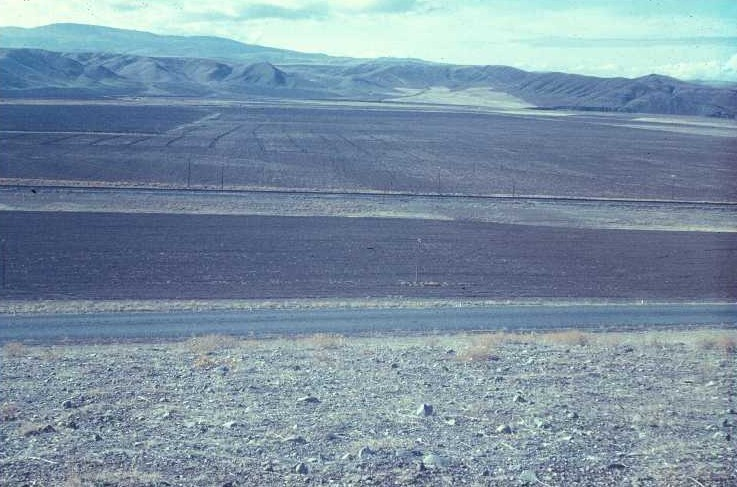
- Delice River valley near Yeni Yapan, Kırıkkale

Location
- Country: Turkey

Physical characteristics
- Source
  - location: Cappadocia
- Mouth
  - location: Kızılırmak

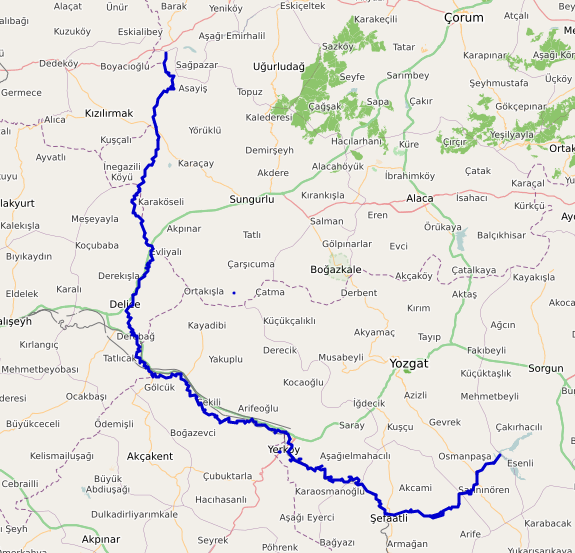
Delice River map

The Delice River (Turkish: Delice Irmağı), perhaps the ancient Cappadox (Ancient Greek: Καππάδοξ), is the major river of Cappadocia in Anatolia, Turkey. It flows into the Kızılırmak River (Halys) at 40.47°N 34.14°E before flowing into the Black Sea.
