= Doğa =

Nature organisation in Turkey

- Doğa Derneği
- Website: dogadernegi.org/en

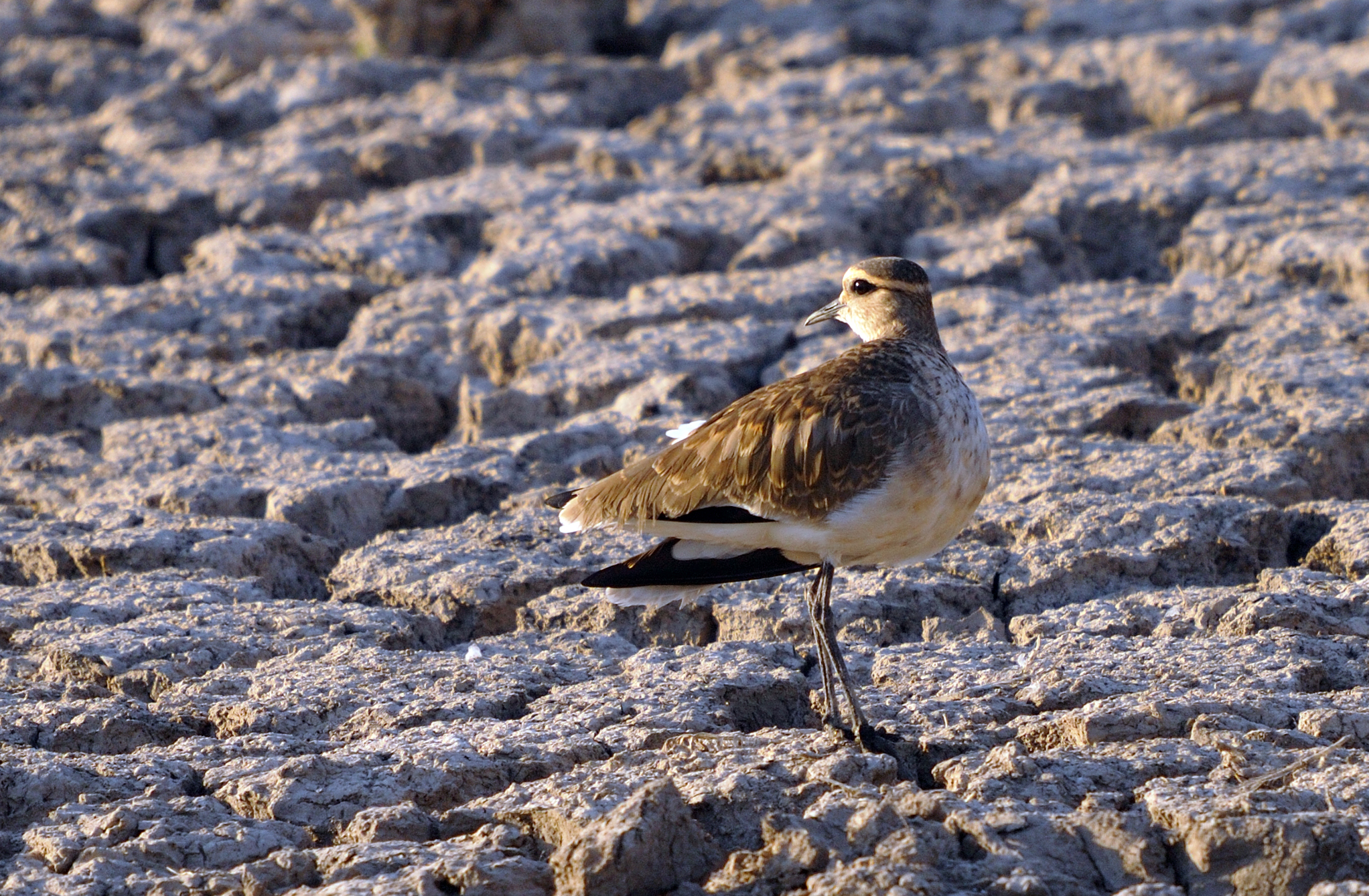
The sociable lapwing is one of the birds studied

Doğa (meaning 'nature' in Turkish) or Doğa Derneği ('Nature Association') is an organisation which defends the rights of nature in Turkey, both birds and biodiversity in general. It is the Turkish partner of BirdLife International, and a member of the International Union for Conservation of Nature.

Erciyes University helped with the national bird observations database Kuşbank, which is part of eBird.

== See also ==
- KuzeyDoğa - conservation organization in Turkey
