= Large-scale coastal behaviour =

Modelling of the large-scale morphodynamic changes of coastal environments

Large-scale coastal behaviour is an attempt to model the morphodynamics of coastal change at time and space scales appropriate to management and prediction. Temporally this is at the decade to century scale, spatially at the scale of tens of kilometers. It was developed by Huib J. de Vriend.

Modelling large-scale coastal behaviour involves some level of parameterisation rather than simply upscaling from process or downscaling from the geological scale. It attempts to recognise patterns occurring at these scales. Cowell and Thom (2005) recognize the need to admit uncertainty in large-scale coastal behaviour, given incomplete process knowledge.
