= Derbent Dam =

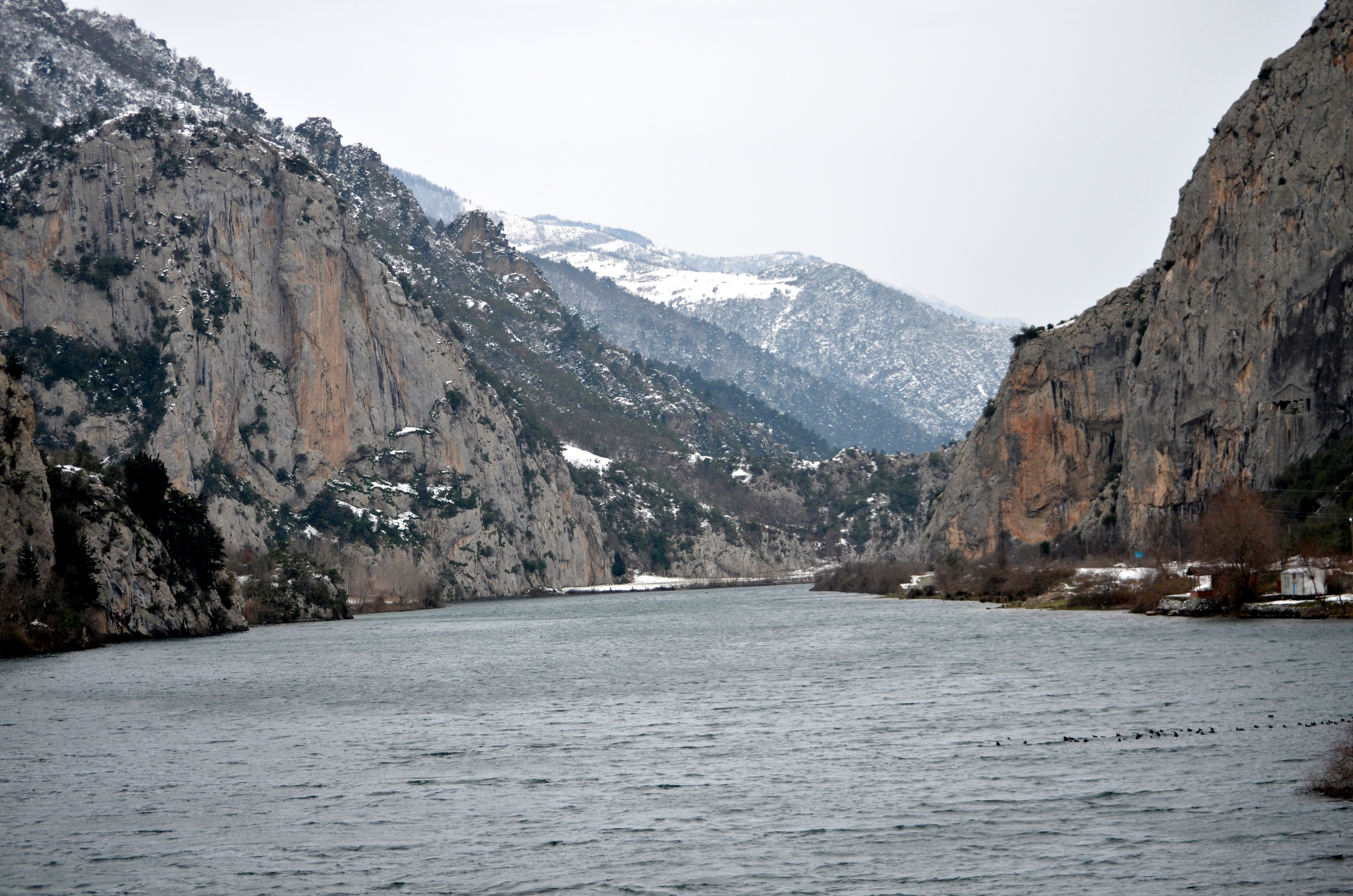

- Location within Turkey
- Location: Turkey
- Coordinates: 41°27′40″N 35°50′30″E
- Construction began: 1984
- Opening date: 1990

Dam and spillways
- Impounds: Kızılırmak River
- Height: 33 m (108 ft)

Reservoir
- Total capacity: 213,000,000 m^{3} (172,682 acre⋅ft)
- Surface area: 16 km^{2} (6 mi^{2})

Power Station
- Installed capacity: 58 MW
- Annual generation: 257 GWh

Derbent Dam is a gravity/embankment dam on the Kızılırmak River in Samsun Province, Turkey. The development was backed by the Turkish State Hydraulic Works.

== See also ==
- List of dams and reservoirs in Turkey
