= List of caves in Turkey =

This is a list of some of the approximately 40,000 caves in Turkey, which provide an important tourist attraction for the country. There are such a high number due to karstification in the west and central Taurus Mountains. The Cavern Research Society (MAD) established in 1964 initially monitored and investigates these caves, a role which has been taken up by BÜMAK (Boğaziçi University Speleological Society) and Karst and Cavern Exploration Unit (under the MTA Geology Studies Department). 800 caves and caverns have been investigated thus far.

== List ==
The following is an incomplete list of caves in Turkey. Show caves are shown in bold. Show caves shoen in italic can be toured by appropriate equipped visitors and under guidance. Not specially indicated caves are reserved for professional cavers only.

Cave	Location	Length
**Buzluk Cave, Ağrı**	Ağrı	
Aşıklar Cave	Antalya	
Altinbesik Cave	Antalya, Akseki	5,481 m (17,982 ft)
Beldibi Cave	Antalya	
Bűyŭkdipsiz Cave	Antalya	
Çimeniçi Cave	Antalya	
**Damlataş Cave**	Antalya, Alanya	
Derya Cave	Antalya	
**Dim Cave**	Antalya	
Fosforlu Cave, Alanya	Antalya	
Geyikbayiri Cavern	Antalya	
Gürleyik Cave, İbradi	Antalya, İbradi	
İnilti Pazarı Yaylacık Caves	Antalya	5,929 m (19,452 ft)
**Karain Cave**	Antalya, Döşemealtı	
Kocadǚden Cave	Antalya	
Kocain Cave	Antalya	633 m (2,077 ft)
Korsaniar Cave	Antalya	
Küçükdipsiz Cave	Antalya	
Mahrumçali Cave	Antalya	
Orçudǚdeni Cave	Antalya	
Papazkayasi Cave	Antalya	
Peynirdeligi Cave	Antalya	
Tilkiler Cave	Antalya, Manavgat	6,818 m (22,369 ft)
**Yalandünya Cave**	Antalya	
Yerköprü Cavern	Antalya	
**Zeytintaşı Cave**	Antalya	
Aslanli Cave	Aydın	
Karaca Cave, Kuşadası	Aydın, Kuşadası	
Yazören Cave	Balıkesir, Savaştepe	3,554 m (11,660 ft)
Baltalıın Cave	Balıkesir	
İnkaya Cave (Balıkesir)	Balıkesir	
**Gürcüoluk Cave**	Bartın	
Kalkanlı Cave	Bingöl	
**İnsuyu Cave**	Burdur	
Ayvaini Cave	Bursa, Ayvaköy	4,866 m (15,965 ft)
**Oylat Cave**	Bursa	
**Kaklık Cave**	Denizli	
**Keloğlan Cave**	Denizli	
Beyyayla Cave	Eskişehir	
Cindi Cave	Eskişehir	
Īnönü Cave	Eskişehir	
Kara Cave	Eskişehir	
Karakaya Cave	Eskişehir	
Karamikini Cave	Eskişehir	
Kőçekkiran Cave	Eskişehir	
Manasır Pit	Eskişehir	
Mayislar Cave	Eskişehir	
Sarikaya Cave	Eskişehir	
Kőçekkiran Cave	Eskişehir	
Yelinüstü Cave	Eskişehir	
Yelini Cave	Eskişehir	
Buzluk Cave, Elazığ	Elazığ	
**Karaca Cave, Torul**	Gümüşhane, Torul	
Sariseki Cave	Hatay	
Ayiini Cave	Isparta	
Inönü Cave	Isparta	
Kuz Cave	Isparta	
Pınargözü Cave	Isparta, Yenisarbademli	5,275 m (17,306 ft)
**Zindan Cave**	Isparta	
İkigöz Cave	Istanbul, Çatalca	4,816 m (15,801 ft)
Yarımburgaz Cave	Istanbul, Başakşehir	
Inkaya Cave	İzmir	
Kurudag Cave	İzmir	
**Mencilis Cave**	Karabük, Safranbolu	5,250 m (17,220 ft)
Düdenağzı Cave'	Karaman, Başyayla	2,528 m (8,294 ft)
Gürlevik Cave, Taşkale	Karaman, Taşkale	
Hislayik Cave	Karaman	
İncesu Cave	Karaman	
Ilgarini Cave	Kastamonu	
Sarpunalinca Cave	Kastamonu	
Kuyluç Cave	Kastamonu	
**Dupnisa Cave**	Kırklareli, Demirköy	3,150 m (10,330 ft)
*Yenesu Cave	Kırklareli	
*Balatini Cave	Konya	
Bǖyǖkdǖden Cave	Konya	
Derebucak Çamlık Caves Natural Monument	Konya	
Körükini Cave	Konya	
Pinarbasi Cave	Konya	
Suluin Cave	Konya	
Susuk Guvercinlik Cave	Konya	
**Tinaztepe Cave System**	Konya	
Caves of Frig Valley	Kütahya	
Akhayat sinkhole	Mersin	
Cehennem Cave	Mersin	
**Cennet Cave**	Mersin	
Çukurpinar Sinkhole	Mersin, Anamur	3,350 m (10,990 ft)
**Dilek Cave**	Mersin	
**Eshab-ı Kehf Cave, Tarsus**	Mersin, Tarsus	
Gilindire Cave	Mersin	
**Köşekbükü Cave**	Mersin	
Morca Cave	Mersin, Anamur	
Narlikuyu Cave	Mersin	
Peynirlikönü-EGMA Sinkhole	Mersin, Anamur	3,118 m (10,230 ft)
Yalan Dünya Cave	Mersin	
Fosforlu Cave, Marmaris	Muğla, Marmaris	
Nimara Cave	Muğla	
Yerküpe Cave	Muğla	
Kuzgun Sinkhole	Niğde	3,187 m (10,456 ft)
**Inalti Cave**	Sinop	
Kunduz Cave	Tokat	
**Ballica Cave**	Tokat	
**Çalköy Cave**	Trabzon	
Akarsu Village Cave	Trabzon	
Çayırköy Cave	Zonguldak, Çayırköy	
Cumayanı Cave	Zonguldak, Çatalağzı	
Erçek Cave	Zonguldak	
**Gökgöl Cave**	Zonguldak	3,350 m (10,990 ft)
Ilıksu Cave	Zonguldak, Ilıksu	
İnağzı Cave	Zonguldak	
Kızılelma Cave	Zonguldak, Ayiçi	6,630 m (21,750 ft)
Sofular Cave	Zonguldak, Sofular	

== See also ==
- List of caves
- Speleology
