= Wetlands of Turkey =

Protected areas of Turkey
Type	Number	Area (ha)
National parks (list)	52	3,287,103
Marine parks (list)	52	3,287,103
Nature parks (list)	274	94,294
Nature preserve areas (list)	32	56,386
Wildlife protection areas (list)	85	1,169,873
Nature monuments (list)	111	8,389
Protected Plains (list)	25	221,229
Wetlands (National)	59	869,697
Wetlands (Local)	65	142,184
Other	1,098	342,138
Grand total	1790	6,154,551
Wetlands (Ramsar) (list)	14	184,487

Wetlands in Turkey are diverse, ranging from alluvial forests, lagoons, saltmarshes and even a caldera lake. Around the time of the formation of modern Turkey after WW1 there were almost 1400 natural wetlands covering almost 14 thousand km^{2}, but by 2014 over 20% of wetland area had been drained (mostly - but some was lost due to changes in precipitation) and 900 wetlands remained. In the early 21st century a law was passed to protect wetlands.

In 2023 the Turkish Nature Association called for Turkish agriculture policy to be changed to protect the water cycle, and they say that water policy is the biggest threat to biodiversity.

As of 2025, there are 14 Ramsar sites, which were designated between 1994 and 2013. As well as Ramsar sites there are also nationally and locally important wetlands, and as of 2021 there are 66 plans. According to Caterina Scaramelli, research assistant professor of anthropology and earth and environment at Boston University, local people are not properly consulted. Because the Directorate of Wetlands Conservation is part of the Ministry of Agriculture and Forestry (it is not part of the Ministry of Environment, Urbanisation and Climate Change), she says there is a conflict of interest. As of 2022 ecosystems services (such as limiting climate change) are not well understood, and some water is not sustainably managed by river basin.

== Peatland ==
Over 80% of peatland has been degraded, but there is a very small area of blanket bog including Ağaçbaşı Peatland, Barma Yaylası Peatland, Yılanlıtaş Yaylası Peatland (Trabzon), Kabaca–Petek Yaylası Peatland, Sazak Peatland (Artvin) and Ciğer Lake Peatland (Çanakkale). Most is high in the north-east. As of 2024 peat was still being extracted in Turkey. Earthquakes may cause methane release which may catch fire.

== See also ==
- List of Ramsar sites in Turkey
