= Lake Meke =

Volcanic crater lake in Konya, Turkey

- Meke Gölü (Turkish)
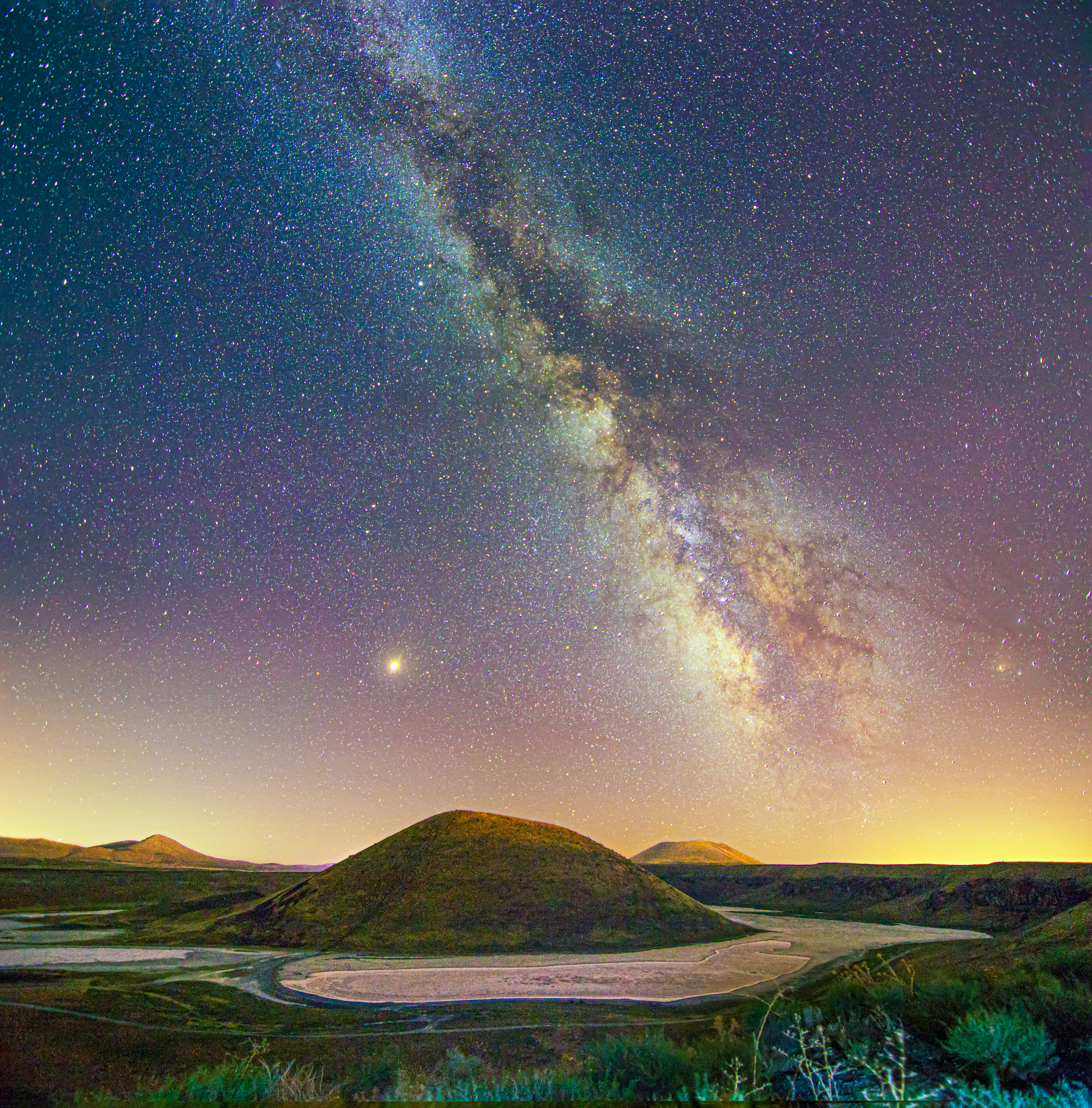
- Lake Meke with volcanic cone inside

- Location of Lake Meke in Turkey.
- Location: Karapınar, Konya Province
- Coordinates: 37°41′07″N 33°38′28″E
- Lake type: Volcanic crater lake
- Basin countries: Turkey
- Max. length: 800 m (2,600 ft)
- Max. width: 500 m (1,600 ft)
- Average depth: 12 m (39 ft)
- Surface elevation: 981 m (3,219 ft)

Ramsar Wetland
- Official name: Meke Maar
- Designated: 21 July 2005
- Reference no.: 1618

Lake Meke (Turkish: Meke Gölü) is a volcanic crater lake composed of two nested lakes located in Konya Province, central Turkey. It is a registered natural monument of the country and a Ramsar site. Lake Meke is located in Karapınar district of Konya Province. It is 9 km (5.6 mi) away from Karapınar, and 2 km (1.2 mi) south of the Konya-Adana highway E981.

It was formed by the flooding of the crater of an extinct volcano, which took shape about 4 million years ago when the volcano erupted. About 9,000 years ago, a second eruption formed another volcanic cone inside the lake with a maar. Lake Meke now consists of two lakes with various islets. It is 800 m (2,600 ft) long and 500 m (1,600 ft) wide with a depth of 12 m (39 ft). The inner lake inside the 50 m (160 ft)-high volcanic cone is 25 m (82 ft) deep, and contains saline water. The volcanic cone island resisted erosion by the harsh weather conditions due to its massive material, and has retained its form for thousands of years.

== Protected areas ==
Lake Meke was declared a first grade protected area in 1989. It was registered as a natural monument in 1998. On June 21, 2005, the lake and its surrounding area was declared a Ramsar site because of its international importance for wildfowl.

== Declining water level ==
A scientist from Selçuk University in Konya stated in 2009 that the lake had nearly dried up. He stated that the reason behind this was the uncontrolled extraction of water for agricultural irrigation and overdrafting. In 2012, it was reported that the lake's capacity had decreased by about 60% within the last twenty years and that there was a risk that it would dry out completely. In many sections of the lake, the water was becoming increasingly saline and crystallization was occurring. A drought season in 2014 caused a lowering of the groundwater level which was responsible for the further drying out of the lake to an extent of almost 99%. The remaining water body was turned red by the large quantity of microorganisms present in the brackish water. Nearly a hundred species of bird which were previously seen at the lake, had by 2015 moved elsewhere.

== Gallery ==
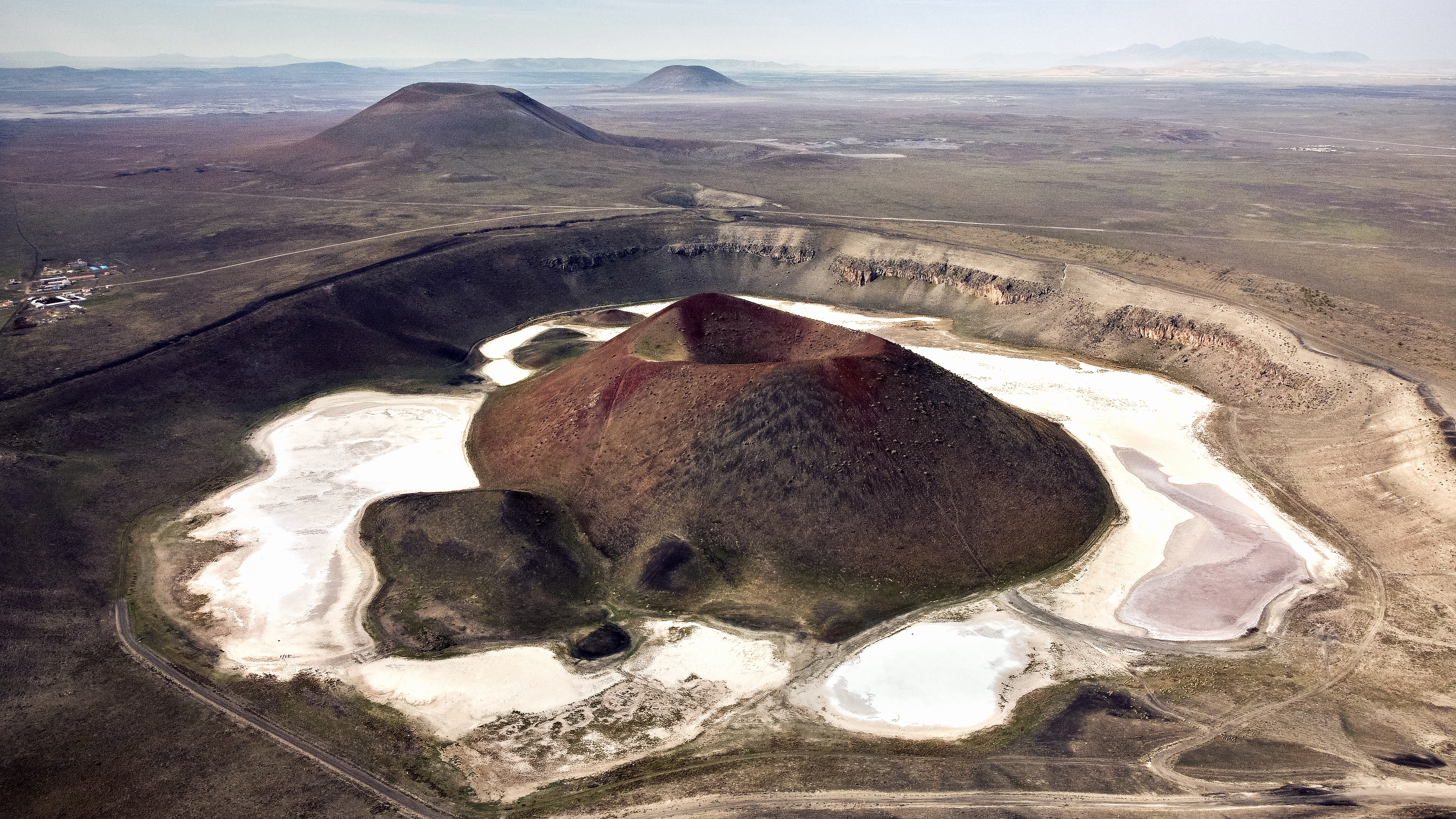
Panorama of Lake Meke

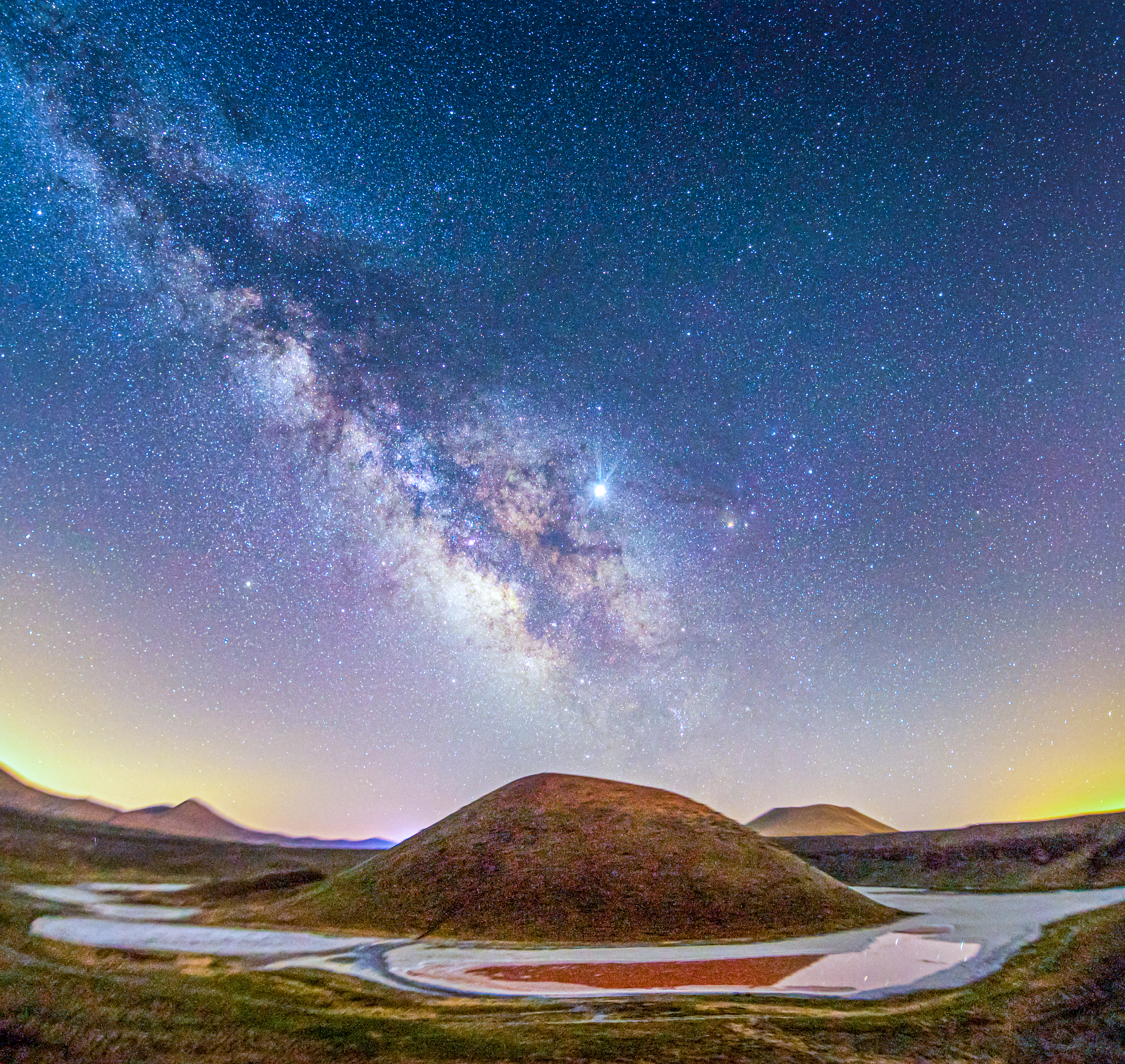
A lighter night shot of Lake Meke

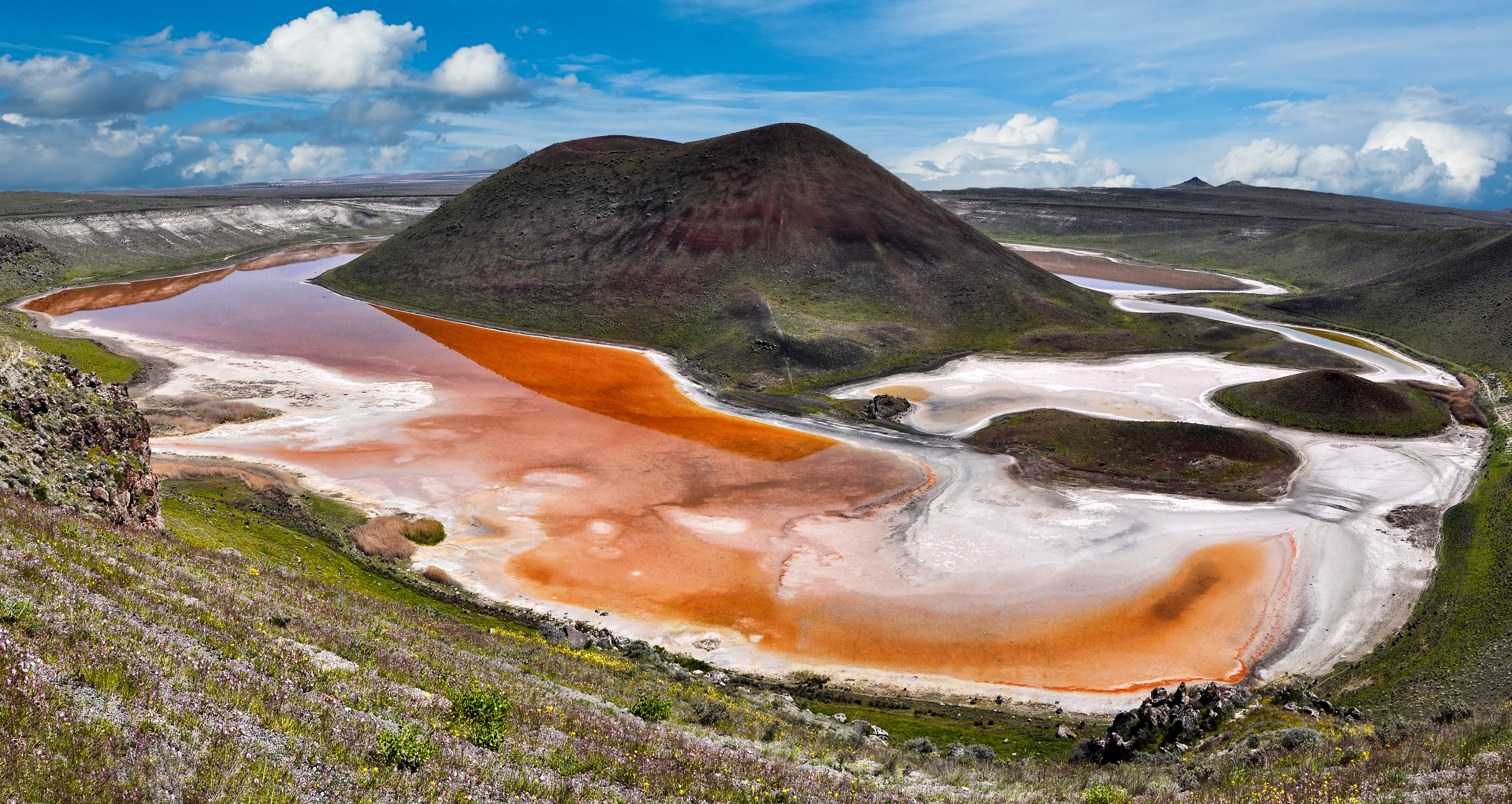
Lake Meke seen from a hill

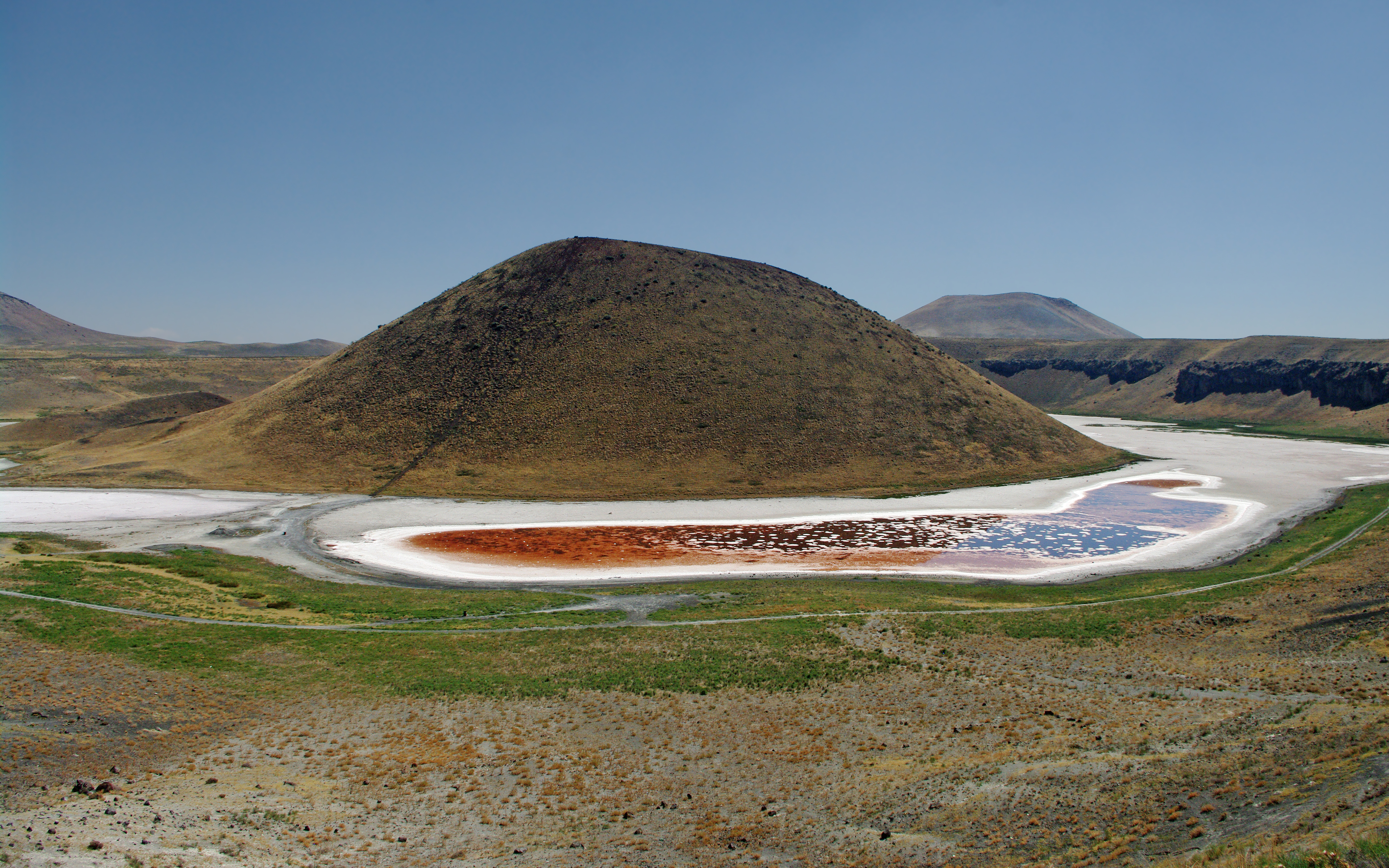
A western side view of Lake Meke in the volcanic area which is located near the city of Karapınar, in the Karapınar District of Konya Province.
