= Lake Seyfe =

Lake in Kırşehir province, Turkey

- Seyfe Gölü (Turkish)
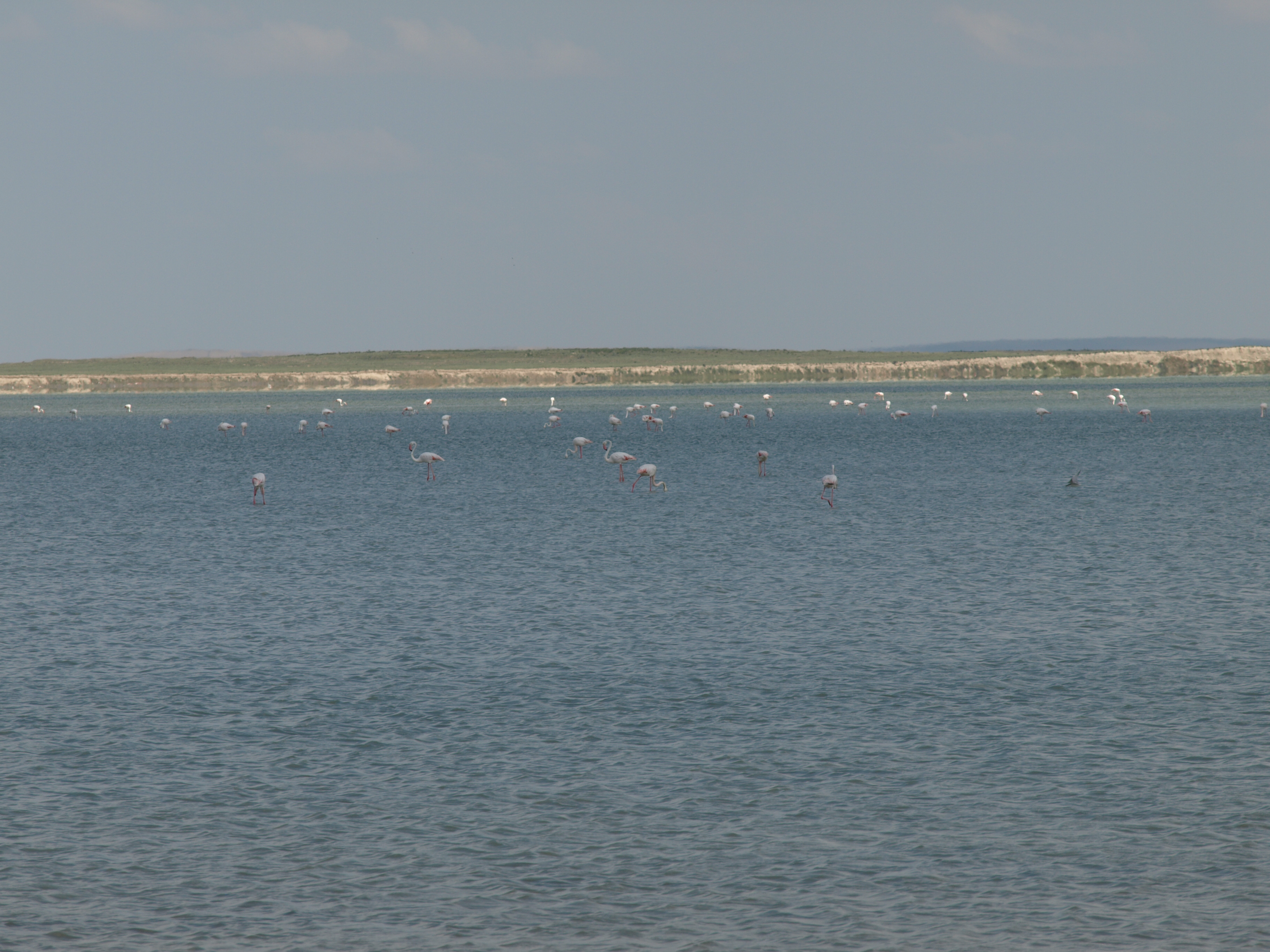
- A view from Lake Seyfe

- Location within Turkey
- Location: Kırşehir Province, Turkey
- Coordinates: 39°11′23″N 34°25′19″E
- Type: lake

Designations

Ramsar Wetland
- Official name: Lake Seyfe
- Designated: 13 July 1994
- Reference no.: 659

Lake Seyfa (Turkish: Seyfe Gölü) is a lake in Kırşehir Province, central Turkey. It is a Ramsar site.

The lake is located in Mucur district 16 km (9.9 mi) northeast of Kırşehir.
