= Habitat of the Year in Latvia =

Habitat of the Year in Latvia is an annual nomination of a habitat type of Latvian ecological habitat. The organization responsible for nominating this symbol of the year is the Latvian Fund for Nature [lv].

The category has been created in 2015, in order to raise awareness about protection of natural diversity. Throughout the year, Latvian Fund for Nature assembles information for the general public about the habitat protection and management, and informs about the ecological function of the selected habitat.

== Selected habitats by the year ==
- 2026 – Tree hollows
- 2025 – Edges (more precisely – ecotones)
- 2024 – Wetlands
- 2023 – Deadwood
- 2022 – Cities
- 2021 – River currents and natural rivers
- 2020 – Park-like meadows
- 2019 – Old or natural temperate coniferous forests
- 2018 – Veteran trees
- 2017 – Farmsteads
- 2016 – Reeds
- 2015 – Biologically important grasslands
