= Trembling aspen =

Trembling aspen is the popular name for either:

- Populus tremuloides (American)
- Populus tremula (Eurasian)

Other uses:

- Trembling aspen (Konya), a tree in Turkey registered as a national natural monument
