= Kızören Sinkhole =

Sinkhole containing a karst lake in Konya, Turkey

Coordinates: 38°10′29″N 33°11′09″E

Designations

Ramsar Wetland
- Official name: Kizören Obrouk
- Designated: 2 May 2006
- Reference no.: 1620

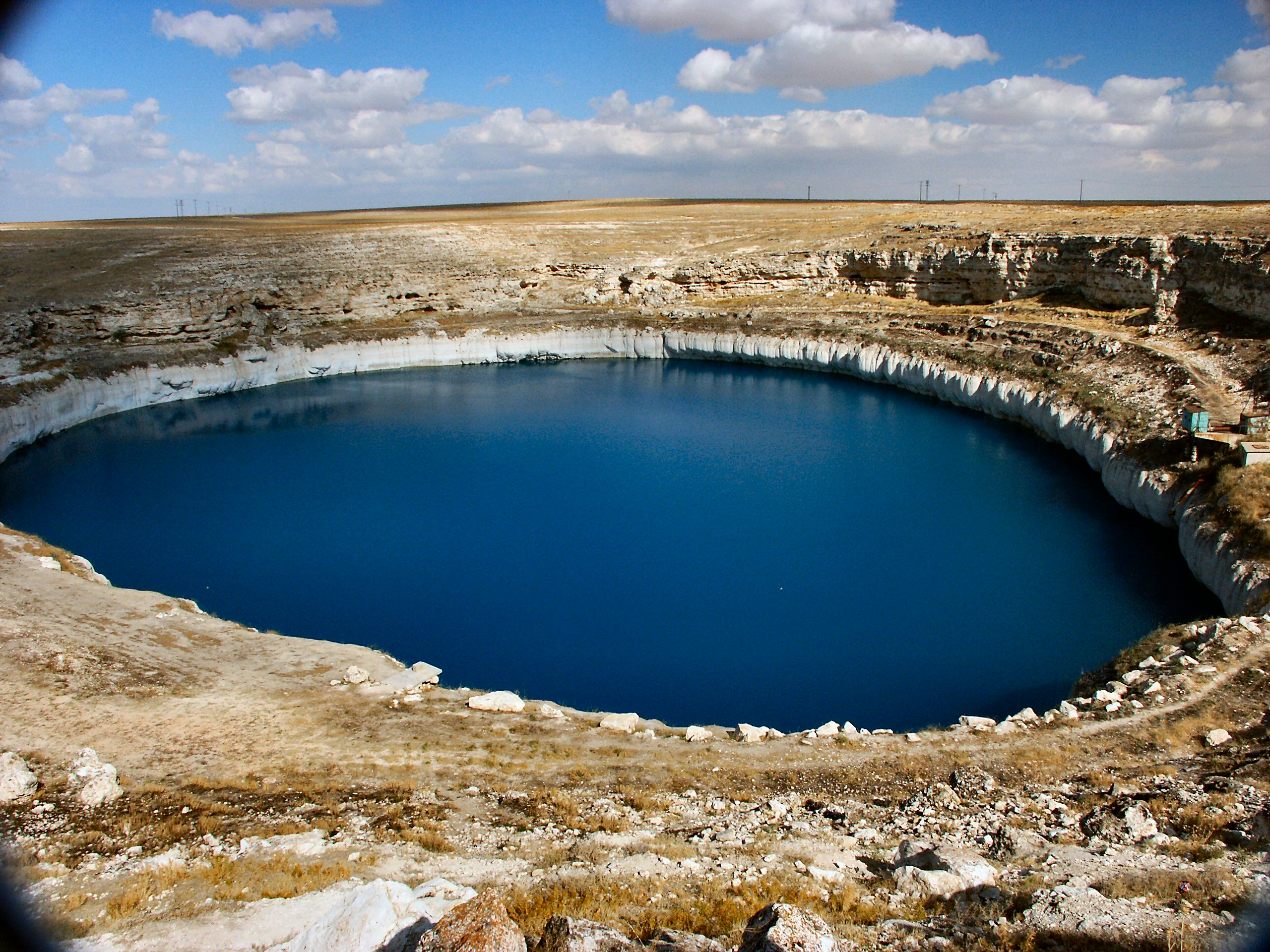
Kızören Sinkhole

Kızören Sinkhole, a.k.a. Kızören Obruk or Lake Kızören (Turkish: Kızören Obruğu) is a sinkhole containing a karst lake near Konya in the historic Konya vilayet, central Turkey. Kızören Obruğu is situated in the centre of the Central Anatolian steppes, 65 km northeast of the city of Konya.

In Turkish, the word obruk means a vertical depression or shaft in a karst landscape which has been formed via karstification in two directions: downwards (from the surface into the ground by infiltration through minor cracks and joints) and upwards (from karstic underground cavities towards the surface by evaporation through minor cracks and joints). The term obruk is used to describe the rare karstic lakes which are found exclusively in the district of Konya in Turkey.

Kızören Obruğu is 180 m long, 150 m wide and up to 145 m deep. For a long time, it was believed that the lake waters were still, but it is now known that the water flows slowly from one lake to the other from underneath. Located at an altitude of 1030 m, Kızören Obruğu is the only source of fresh water for human use in the vicinity.

The State Water Institute (DSI) has installed a pump in the obruk to provide fresh water for the local community.

== Settlements and structures (ancient/historic/modern) ==
The region of Konya was inhabited prior to 7500 BC. One of the oldest and largest known Neolithic communities, the settlement of Çatalhöyük, where agriculture was first practiced, is situated 64 km south-east of the Kizören sinkhole. Although only partially excavated, the settlement covers an area of 15 acres and presents evidence of sophisticated town planning, art and ceremonial buildings.

Human activity around the lake dates from the time of the Seljuk Empire. Being the sole source of water in the area, it gave its name to the settlement that is situated in the vicinity of the lake: the village of Obruk.

The remains of an inn, the Obruk Han, are situated 30 m from the lake. The caravanserai was probably constructed during the Byzantine era (c.1245–1250 AD) and remained in operation under Ottoman rule. The dimensions of the building are indicative of the site's importance as a way-stage on the Silk Road. It is a Ramsar site.

The sinkhole continues to attract domestic and international tourism as it is currently the largest sinkhole in Turkey.
