= Belbaşı =

Cave and archaeological site in southern Turkey

- location in Turkey
- 36°34′39″N 29°58′14″E
- Periods: Paleolithic, Mesolithic, Neolithic
- Location: southwest of Antalya
- Region: Turkey

Site notes
- Excavation dates: 1960s

Belbaşı is a cave and a late Paleolithic/Mesolithic site in southern Turkey, located southwest of Antalya.

== Overview ==
Belbaşı culture is a term sometimes used to describe the prehistoric culture whose clearly identifiable traces at the site were explored in the 1960s, as well as being sometimes used to include also the succeeding Mesolithic/proto-Neolithic culture of Beldibi Cave nearby, at only a few kilometers distance to the north; or, in a wider sense, to cover the entire sequence constituted by half a dozen caves west of Antalya, encompassing, in this sense, also the Neolithic sites at, from south to north, Çarkin, Öküzlü and Karain Cave caves. Other sources may start the sequence at Beldibi, thus referring to a Beldibi culture, or treat each cave individually. Such a sequence from late Paleolithic to Neolithic in such closely located sites is unknown elsewhere.

Belbaşı culture tool kit includes tangled arrowheads, triangular points and obliquely truncated blades.

Beldibi culture further offers colored rock engravings on the walls of the cave, hitherto the only known cave art in western Asia, as well as furniture art decorated with naturalistic forms and geometric ornament. Its phases contained imported obsidian, presumably from eastern Taurus Mountains or from the north of the River Gediz, and early forms of pottery. Bones of deer, ibex and cattle occur, and subsistence was likely assisted by coastal fishing from the very close Mediterranean Sea and by the gathering of wild grain. There is as yet no evidence of food production or herding.

Since the proto-Neolithic of Beldibi being a development from the Mesolithic of Belbaşı is only a possibility, although a strong one, sources differ in their choice of terms for the cultures concerned.

The lithic assemblage of both cultures were based upon microliths.

== Connections with other prehistoric cultures ==
Belbaşı culture shows indications of an early connection to the Kebaran industry assemblages of Palestine. Their settlements were stable, typical of Natufian culture sites in this respect, and many later evolved into agricultural villages, similar to Jericho’s forerunner Tell es-Sultan, settled around 7,800 years BCE.

Their most lasting effect was felt not in the Near East, where they seem to have left no permanent mark on the cultural development of Anatolia after 5,000 years BCE, but in Europe, for it was to this new continent that the neolithic cultures of Anatolia introduced the first beginnings of agriculture and stock breeding.

== See also ==
- Karain Cave
- List of caves in Turkey
