= Sweet chestnut of Gölcük Highland =

Old chestnut tree in İzmir Province, western Turkey

- Location within Turkey
- Species: Chestnut (Castanea sativa)
- Location: İzmir Province
- Coordinates: 38°16′58″N 28°00′49″E
- Height: 20 m (66 ft)
- Girth: 10m
- Diameter: 3 m (9.8 ft)

The sweet chestnut of Gölcük Highland (Turkish: Anadolu Kestanesi) is a very old chestnut tree in İzmir Province, western Turkey. It is a registered natural monument of the country.

The chestnut tree is located at Gölcük Highland in Ödemiş district of İzmir Province. It is a sweet chestnut (Castanea sativa). The tree is 20 m (66 ft) high, has a circumference of 10 m (33 ft) at 3 m (9.8 ft) diameter. Its age is dated to be about 600 years old.

The tree was registered a natural monument on September 27, 1994. The protected area of the plant covers 2,500 m^{2} (27,000 sq ft).

== See also ==
- Hundred Horse Chestnut, an individual chestnut tree in Italy
