= Koca Katran (Mersin) =

Monumental old prickly cedar in Mersin Province

Koca katran (Big old prickly cedar)
- Interactive map of Koca katran (Big old prickly cedar)
- Species: Prickly cedar (Juniperus oxycedrus)
- Location: Cocokdere Valley, Toroslar, Mersin Province, Turkey
- Coordinates: 37°02′22″N 34°18′45″E
- Date seeded: 1369; 657 years ago
- Custodian: Ministry of Forest and Water Management

Koca Katran (literally "big cedar") is a monumental old prickly cedar (Juniperus oxycedrus) in Mersin Province, southern Turkey. It is a registered natural monument of the country.

The tree is in Dümbelek Pass of Cocokdere Valley in Toros Mountains at an elevation of 1,875 m (6,152 ft). Nearest settlements are Arslanköy town and Tırtar village of Toroslar district in Mersin Province. Its distance to Mersin city center is about 60 km (37 mi). Entrance to the valley, where the tree is situated, is barred, and access is subject to permission from the forestry authority.

The tree is 40 m (130 ft) high and the circumference of its trunk is 7.50 m (24.6 ft) at 2.45 m (8.0 ft) diameter. The nameplate at site states the age of the cedar as 625 years old.

The old tree was registered a natural monument on September 27, 1994.

== See also ==
- List of individual trees
