= Ana Ardıç monumental tree =

Tree in Turkey

Ana Ardıç
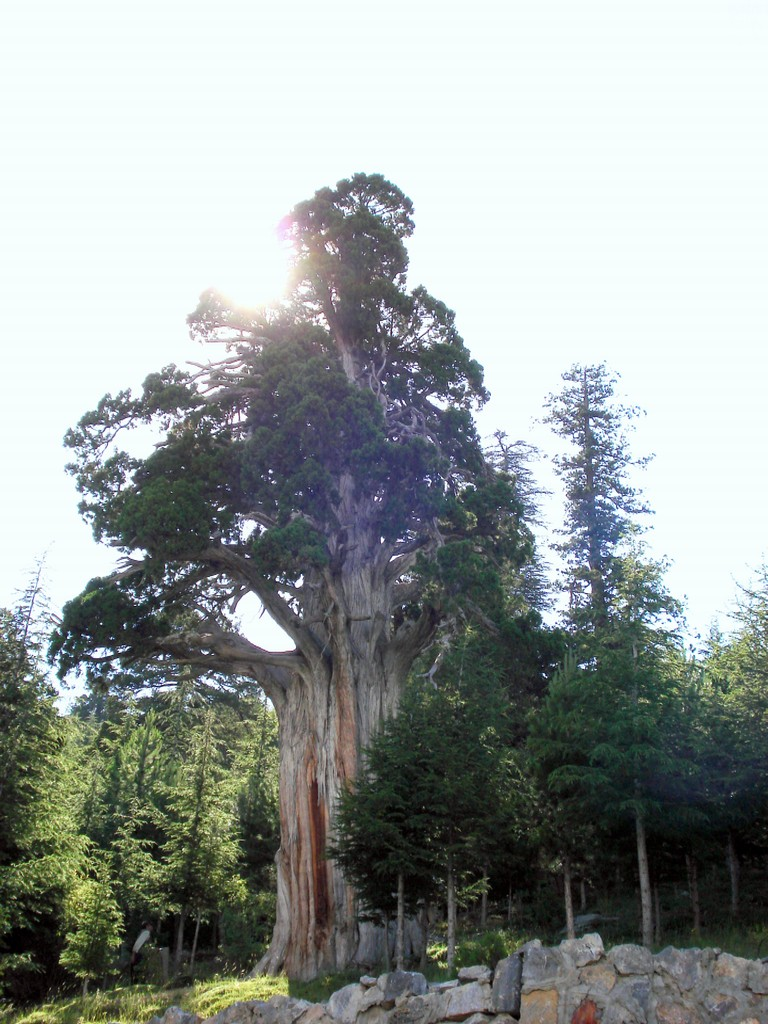

- Location within Turkey
- Location: Kozpınarı, Çamlıyayla, Mersin Province, Turkey
- Coordinates: 37°15′58″N 34°33′41″E
- Height: 22 metres (72 ft)
- Diameter: 3.5 metres (11 ft)

Ana Ardıç (literally “main juniper”) is a monumental tree in Turkey which is included in the list of natural monuments of Turkey.

The tree is in Kozpınarı location of Toros Mountains at an altitude of 1,850 metres (6,070 ft). Administratively, it is in Çamlıyayla ilçe (district) of Mersin Province. Its distance to Çamlıyayla is about 20 kilometres (12 mi) and to Mersin is 88 kilometres (55 mi).

As of 2015 the tree was 1107 years old. Its height is 22 metres (72 ft) and the diameter of its trunk is 3.5 metres (11 ft). On 29 September 1994 the tree was declared a natural monument.
