= Veteran tree =

Tree of great value due to its age

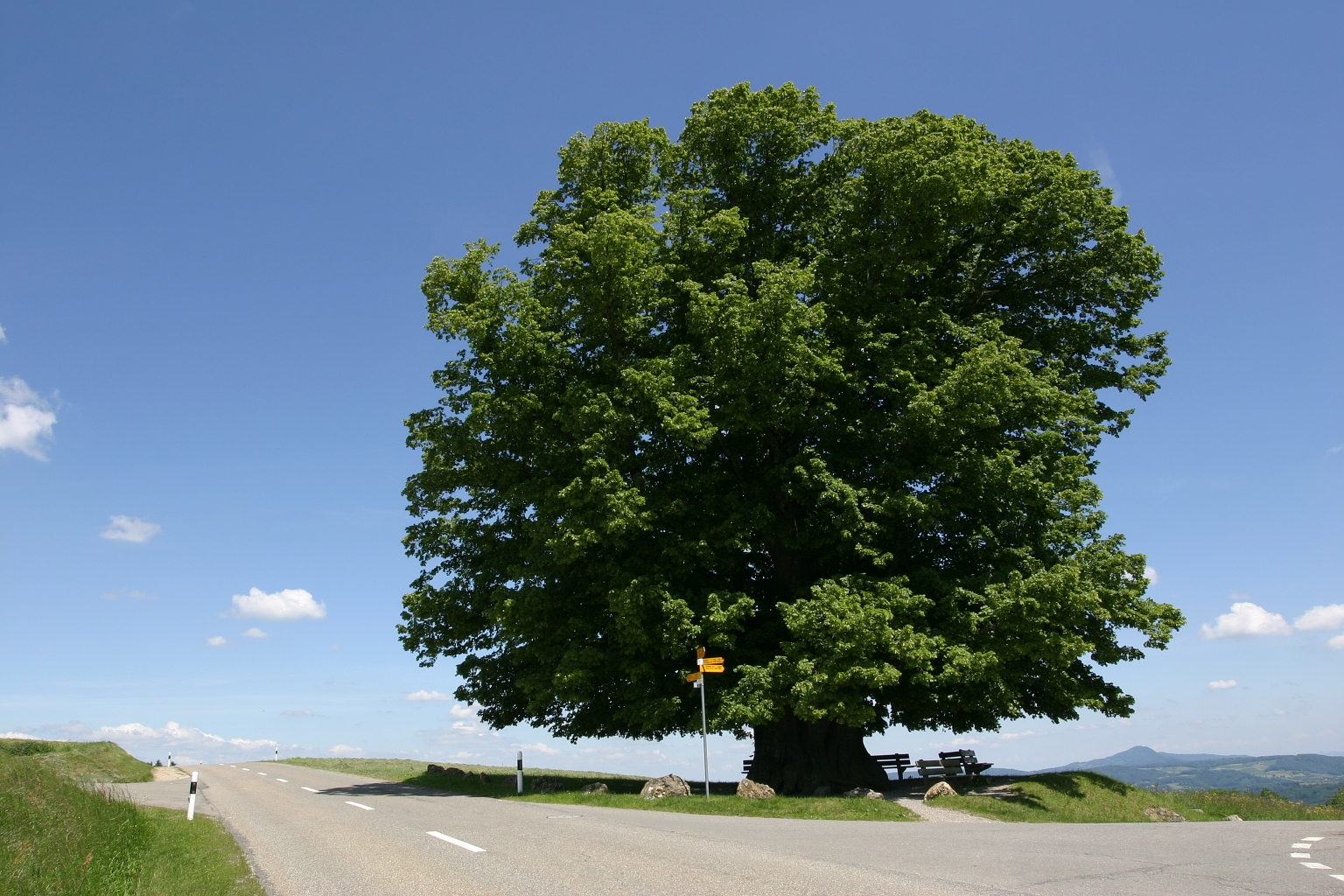
A veteran tree, Linde von Linn, in Switzerland (2006)

A veteran tree is one that has ancient features but not the great age of an ancient tree, and is a tree of great cultural, landscape, or biodiversity value due to its ecological and habitat features.

== Definition ==
Ancient trees exist in many forms and sizes, with ages ranging according to species and environment, with some lasting for hundreds of years; smaller trees, such as in orchards, can exhibit veteran characteristics after only a few decades. A girth of more than 3 meters at 1.5 meters could be used as a measure to identify if a tree is a veteran. However, other veteran tree characteristics may be taken into account, and alternative girths may be established for different tree species.

Ancient trees often have features of particularly high nature conservation value, such as dead limbs, hollows, rot holes, water pools, seepages, woodpecker holes, splits, loose bark, limbs reaching the ground, and epiphytic plants and lichens. Few of these features are found on younger trees, and they provide habitats and foraging grounds for many species of animals and fungi, some of which are rare. Such features are sometimes removed or damaged by pruning or other arboricultural practices.

Ancient trees can be found in various locations, from dense woodlands to hedgerows, village greens, and ancient parks and wood pastures. They thrive in a variety of settings, such as dense woodland, but are more commonly found as hedgerow trees, on village greens, and in ancient parks and other wood pastures.

Many of the oldest trees are pollards, which is a method of heavily pruning trees by cutting the tree above the browse height of animals. This cultural practice has mostly died out in the UK, except for street trees.

== United Kingdom ==
Ancient trees occur more frequently in Great Britain than in many other parts of northern Europe. In the United Kingdom in recent years, these trees are being recorded by the Ancient Tree Hunt so that a national database can be created. Mass participation by thousands of eager volunteers led to the success of this initiative.

Although some initiatives have strict rules on how to measure the girth and use GPS devices to document the location of such trees accurately, other schemes rely on members of the public to report large trees. The public has been encouraged to hug big trees in their area to get a measure of their size and report their findings to Natural England or another veteran tree organization. 19th-century maps are also being used to find old trees in places such as Cambridgeshire.

== Australia ==
In Australia, veteran trees are often connected with the social, cultural, and legal practices of the Aboriginal peoples. More recent European history of settlement has also produced historical linkages through individual trees that have survived.

Existing prominent trees were often used as survey points indicating boundaries of both private and government land tenure. Some trees hold an exalted position because they were marked (blazed) by 19th-century explorers.

Australia does not have the history of commons and parkland that help explain these landscape forms elsewhere. The new settlers did however bring with them an appreciation of the value of trees for fuel, fodder, and raw material for building; many of them also showed an appreciation of the amenity value of trees, planting large spreading shade trees on their properties and within their newly founded towns and cities.

Many of the ancient trees identified today reflect previous patterns of settlement, showing the economic, cultural, and social organizations influencing the lives of those living on the land. They often display the physical scars of traumatic events both man-made and natural. A tree like this is said to have been veteranized.

There is legislation (in the form of national, state, and local laws) that recognizes the importance of protecting the environment, but activists have identified gaps in the protection afforded veteran trees, particularly in the face of ever-increasing pressures of urban development.

== Italy ==
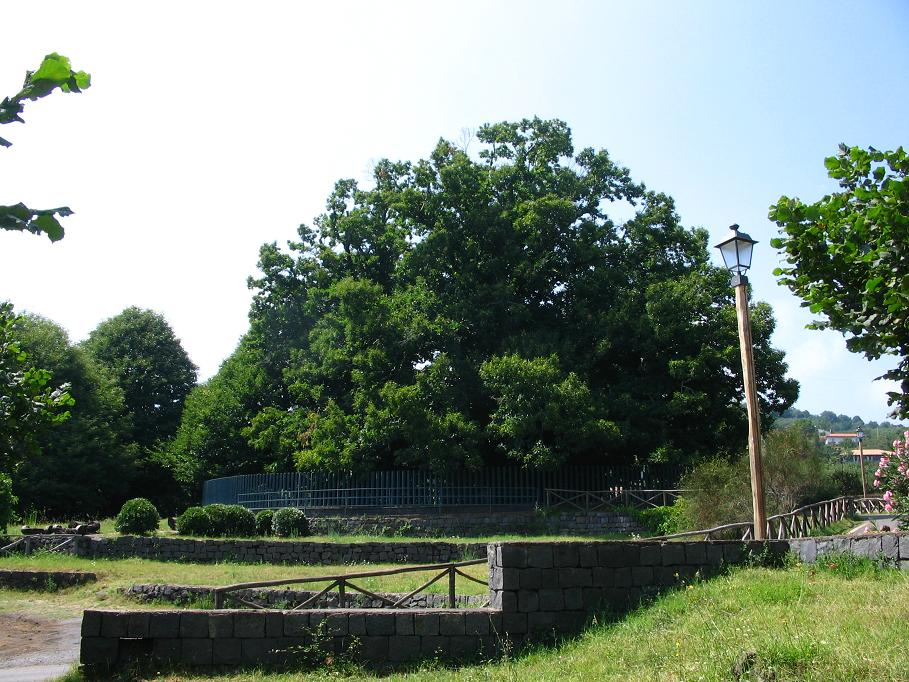
Hundred Horse Chestnut, the oldest Chestnut tree in the world (Sicily)

In Italy, general features required in order to identify an Albero Monumentale (literally "monumental tree") are defined by national law number 10 of January 14 2013, Norme per lo sviluppo degli spazi verdi urbani, which also requires Italian municipalities (comuni) to take a census of their veteran trees. Defining local standards, census details, and law enforcement aspects such as fines or subsidies related to veteran trees is a matter transferred to the regions, which usually implement specific leggi regionali ('regional laws').

== Turkey ==
The Turkish equivalent of the English term 'veteran tree' is 'Anıt Ağaç' that is defined in Turkey by TS 13137 Monumental Trees Inventory Selection Rules and Marking Standard.

== Silviculture and veterans ==
Silviculture originally was developed to provide timber from forests run as plantations, but now forestry expands to consider non-economic values and ecological values. As a result, these other values are also considered in silvicultural systems that may lead to veteran trees being supported where they exist or created where they have not previously been so considered. The Shelterwood with reserves method is a form of Shelterwood cutting that may do this.

== See also ==
- List of oldest trees
- Tree preservation order
- Ancient woodland
