= Mızıkçam =

Pine tree in Turkey

Coordinates: 39°48′09″N 29°38′04″E

Mızıkçam is an old pine tree in Kütahya Province, western Turkey. It is a registered natural monument of the country.

Mızıkçam is located at Domurköy village of Domaniç district in Kütahya Province. It is a black pine (Pinus nigra). Its age is dated to be more than 700 years old. The tree was registered a natural monument on July 12, 1993. The protected area of the plant covers 4,980 m^{2} (53,600 sq ft).
