= Akbaş, Serik =

Akbaş
- Neighbourhood
- Location in Turkey
- Coordinates: 37.0542°N 31.1032°E
- Country: Turkey
- Province: Antalya
- District: Serik
- Population (2022): 560
- Time zone: UTC+3 (TRT)

Akbaş is a neighbourhood in the municipality and district of Serik, Antalya Province, Turkey. Its population is 560 (2022).

Zeytintaşı Cave, which is a natural monument registered show cave, is located close to the village.
