= Giuseppe Borrello =

Giuseppe Borrello (1820–1894) was an Italian poet, who wrote mainly in Sicilian, and was an Italian patriot.

Borrello was born and died in Catania.

The son of a bailiff of the Kingdom of the Two Sicilies, he lost both parents in 1837 when Catania was experiencing a cholera epidemic. During the epidemic he was invested with exceptional powers by the Bourbon, but was relieved of his duties when his liberal ideas became known.

During the popular revolts of 1848 he was among the main provocateurs in Catania, and after the Bourbons restored power he had to retreat to Malta to escape the subsequent repression. In 1855 he had a collection of poems printed in Sicilian. He signed himself in Sicilian as Puddu Burreddu.

During the Risorgimento in 1860 he joined the volunteers following the Expedition of the Thousand and in Garibaldi's forces reached the rank of Major.

After his military service he became chancellor of the Court of Caltagirone and then conciliatory judge.

He died at age seventy-four and the news of his death was given by his disciple Nino Martoglio.

In the June 24 issue of his periodical "D'Artagnan," Martoglio wrote, "He was my master, esteemed and revered... From him I learned to love the suave and harsh dialect full of love and hate, your name will always have an altar in my heart. Farewell!"

The City of Catania dedicated a street to him.

An anthology of his poems is simply entitled: Puisii Siciliani (Sicilian Poems).

== Example ==
The following short poem pays homage to the renowned Chestnut Tree of One Hundred Horses:

| Sicilian | English |
|---|---|
| Un pedi di castagna | A chestnut tree |
| tantu grossu | was so large |
| ca ccu li rami so' forma un paracqua | that its branches formed a shelter |
| sutta di cui si riparò di l'acqua, | under which refuge was sought from the rain |
| di fùrmini, e saitti | from thunder bolts and flashes of lightning |
| la riggina Giuvanna | by Queen Joanne |
| ccu centu cavaleri, | with a hundred knights, |
| quannu ppi visitari Mungibeddu | when on her way to Mt Etna |
| vinni surprisa di lu timpurali. | was taken by surprise by a fierce storm. |
| D'allura si chiamò | From then on so was it named |
| st'àrvulu situatu 'ntra 'na valli | this tree nestled in a valley and its courses |
| lu gran castagnu d'i centu cavalli. | the great chestnut tree of one hundred horses. |

== Works ==
- Puisii Siciliani, Tipografia dei Fratelli Giuntini, Catania, 1855
- Li funerali a lu chiuppu di S. Maria di Gesù : elegia vernacula, Galatola, Catania, 1860

== Bibliography ==
- Enciclopedia di Catania di Autori Vari Diretta da Vittorio Consoli, ed. Tringale Edizione, 1987 (Vol. 1 pp. 112–113)
- Un decennio di cospirazione in Catania (1850-1860): Con carteggi e documenti, Giannotta, 1907
- Giuseppe Borrello, Poesie siciliane, Catania, Spampinato & Sgroi, 1923.
