= Sweet chestnut of Ovacık village =

Very old chestnut tree in İzmir Province, western Turkey

- Species: Chestnut (Castanea sativa)
- Location: Turkey
- Height: 18 m (59 ft)
- Girth: 8.7m
- Diameter: 2.8 m (9 ft 2 in)

Sweet chestnut of Ovacık village (Turkish: Ovacık Köyü Anadolu Kestanesi) is a very old chestnut tree in İzmir Province, western Turkey. It is a registered natural monument of the country.

The chestnut tree is located at Ovacık Highland close to Ovacık village in Kemalpaşa district of İzmir Province. It is a sweet chestnut (Castanea sativa). The tree is 18 m (59 ft) high, has a circumference of 8.70 m (28.5 ft) at 2.80 m (9.2 ft) diameter. Its age is dated to be about 500 years old.

The tree was registered a natural monument on February 21, 1995. The protected area of the plant covers 2,500 m^{2} (27,000 sq ft).
