= Sweet chestnut of Mount Tota =

Old chestnut tree in Isparta Province, western Turkey

- Location within Turkey
- Location: Turkey
- Coordinates: 37°31′04″N 31°09′08″E
- Height: 12 m (39 ft)
- Girth: 3.1 m
- Diameter: 1 m (3 ft 3 in)

Sweet chestnut of Mount Tota (Turkish: Tota Dağı Anadolu Kestanesi) is an old chestnut tree in Isparta Province, western Turkey. It is a registered natural monument of the country.

The chestnut tree is located on Mount Tota at Kasımlar village in Sütçüler district of Isparta Province. It is a sweet chestnut (Castanea sativa). The tree is 12 m (39 ft) high, has a circumference of 3.10 m (10.2 ft) at 1 m (3.3 ft) diameter. Its age is dated to be about 190 years old.

The tree was registered a natural monument on September 6, 2002. The protected area of the plant covers 1,000 m^{2} (11,000 sq ft).
