= Kocain Cave =

Cave in Antalya Province, southwestern Turkey

- Kocain Mağarası
- Location within Turkey
- Location: Ahırtaş village, Döşemealtı, Antalya Province, Turkey
- Coordinates: 37°13′44″N 30°42′37″E
- Length: 633 m (2,077 ft)
- Discovery: 1919
- Cave survey: 1972

Kocain Cave (Turkish: Kocain Mağarası) is a cave in Antalya Province, southwestern Turkey. It is a registered natural monument.

The cave is situated in Killik location of Ahırtaş village at Döşemealtı district of Antalya Province. It was discovered in 1919, and was surveyed by scientists from Ankara University several times after 1946. First exploration in terms of speleology was carried out in cooperation with French speleologists in 1972. The cave is 633 m (2,077 ft) long and has two large chambers on the main gallery, which has a clearance of 80 m (260 ft) at some places. The cave entrance is about 75 m (246 ft) wide and 20 m (66 ft) high. The cave features monumental stalactites and stalagmites. It is assumed that the cave was used for religious purposes during the early Christianity due to existence of readable inscriptions. Above data is taken from the cave's information board visible at external link.

The cave was registered a natural monument on August 16, 2013. It covers an area of 60.806 ha (150.25 acres).
