= Geyik Alanı Grove =

Turkish pine grove

Geyik Alanı Grove Geyik Alanı

Geography
- Location: Turkey
- Area: 11.000 ha (27.18 acres)

Administration
- Status: Protected

Ecology
- Indicator plants: Scots pine

Geyik Alanı Grove (Turkish: Geyik Alanı) is a pine grove in Eskişehir Province, western Turkey. "Geyik Alanı" means "Deer Field". The area is a registered natural monument of the country.

Geyik Alanı Grove features 200–400 years old trees of Scots pine, which are 38–45 m (125–148 ft) high. The trees are at straight and well-rounded stand. The grove covers an area of 11.000 ha (27.18 acres). The area was registered a natural monument on November 3, 2000.
