= List of natural monuments of Turkey =

Protected areas of Turkey
Type	Number	Area (ha)
National parks (list)	52	3,287,103
Marine parks (list)	52	3,287,103
Nature parks (list)	274	94,294
Nature preserve areas (list)	32	56,386
Wildlife protection areas (list)	85	1,169,873
Nature monuments (list)	111	8,389
Protected Plains (list)	25	221,229
Wetlands (National)	59	869,697
Wetlands (Local)	65	142,184
Other	1,098	342,138
Grand total	1790	6,154,551
Wetlands (Ramsar) (list)	14	184,487

This is a list of natural monuments of Turkey. As of July 1, 2015, there are 112 natural monuments (Turkish: Tabiat anıtı) comprising caves, landforms, waterfalls and mostly old trees (Tree). These protected natural or cultural features of outstanding or unique value are administered by the Directorate-General of Nature Protection and National Parks (Turkish: Doğa Koruma ve Milli Parklar Genel Müdürlüğü) of the Ministry of Environment and Forest.

#	Name	Location	Type	Area (ha)	Established
1	Samandere Waterfall	Düzce	Waterfall	10.996	1988
2	Mızıkçam (Black pine)	Kütahya	Tree	0.498	1993
3	Bığbığ Orman Sarmaşığı (Bığbığ Ivy)	Adana	Tree	0.015	1994
4	Asarlık Tepeler (Asarlık Hills)	Ankara	Landform	52.374	1994
5	Titrek Kavak (Trembling aspen (Konya))	Konya	Tree	0.249	1994
6	Anadolu Kestanesi (Sweet chestnut (Gölcük Highland))	İzmir	Tree	5.226	1994
7	Araç Türbe Çamı (Tomb pine of Araç)	Kastamonu	Tree	0.249	1994
8	Eskipazar Türbe Çamı (Tomb pine of Eskipazar)	Karabük	Tree	0.500	1994
9	Fosil Ardıç (Petrified juniper)	Konya	Tree	0.500	1994
10	Koca Katran (Big old prickly cedar)	Mersin	Tree	0.249	1994
11	Ana Ardıç (Mother juniper)	Mersin	Tree	0.003	1994
12	Barla Sedir Ağacı (Barla cedar)	Isparta	Tree	0.249	1994
13	Çatal Sedir Ağacı (Forked cedar)	Burdur	Tree	0.249	1994
14	Dokuzkardeşler Çamı (Nine siblings pine)	Çankırı	Tree	0.149	1994
15	Kızılca Elmalı Meşesi (Kasnak oak)	Sinop	Tree	0.249	1994
16	Kunduracı Çınar (Shoemaker's plane tree)	İzmir	Tree	0.149	1994
17	Söğüt Yaylası Ulu Ardıç (Almighty juniper of Söğüt Highland)	Isparta	Tree	0.249	1994
18	Taşdede Pırnal Meşesi (Holy oak of Taşdede)	İzmir	Tree	0.249	1994
19	Görkemli Meşe (Splendid oak)	Sinop	Tree	0.249	1994
20	Güney Waterfall	Denizli	Waterfall	0.498	1994
21	Meşe Ağacı (Oak tree)	Adapazarı	Tree	0.249	1994
22	Teos Menengici (Turpentine tree of Teos)	Yozgat	Tree	0.149	1994
23	Ulu Kavak (Almighty aspen)	Yozgat	Tree	0.149	1994
24	Subaşı Havuzlar Çınarları (Plane trees of Havuzlar, Subaşı)	Istanbul	Tree	0.249	1995
25	Bayır Çınarı (Plane tree of Bayır)	Muğla	Tree	0.149	1995
26	Bayır Servi Ağacı (Cypress of Bayır)	Muğla	Tree	0.149	1995
27	Kızılağaç Köyü Lübnan Sediri (Cedar of Lebanon in Kızılağaç village)	Antalya	Tree	0.249	1995
28	Koca Katran Lübnan sediri (Big old cedar of Lebanon)	Antalya	Tree	0.249	1995
29	Koç Sedir (Ram-formed cedar)	Antalya	Tree	0.250	1995
30	Ovacık Köyü Anadolu Kestanesi (Sweet chestnut of Ovacık village)	İzmir	Tree	0.249	1995
31	Söğüt Köyü Çınarı (Plane tree of Söğüt village)	Muğla	Tree	0.249	1995
32	Şah Ardıç (Shah juniper)	Antalya	Tree	0.249	1995
33	Ulu Meşe (Almighty oak)	Muğla	Tree	0.150	1995
34	Aslan Ardıcı (Lion juniper)	Antalya	Tree	0.249	1995
35	Beldeğirmeni Köyü Çınarı (Plane tree of Beldeğirmeni village)	Kastamonu	Tree	0.149	1995
36	Çatal Çam (Forked pine)	Isparta	Tree	0.249	1995
37	Erenler Çamı (Pine of Erenler)	Kastamonu	Tree	0.149	1995
38	Karanlık Köyü Sediri (Cedar of Karanlık village)	Antalya	Tree	0.249	1995
39	Oniki Kardeşler Kayın Ağacı (Twelve siblings beech)	Kastamonu	Tree	0.149	1995
40	Aliağanın Kavağı (Aliağa's aspen)	Gümüşhane	Tree	0.100	1995
41	Kirani Evliya Ardıcı (Saint Kirani's juniper)	Gümüşhane	Tree	0.249	1995
42	İlk Kurşun Çınarı (Plane tree of First bullet)	İzmir	Tree	0.250	1995
43	Yarendere Fistıkçamı (Stone pine of Yarandere)	İzmir	Tree	0.249	1995
44	Yemişçi Çınarı (Plane tree of Yemişçi)	İzmir	Tree	0.463	1995
45	Yemişçi Fıstıkçamı (Stone pine of Yemişçi)	İzmir	Tree	0.659	1995
46	Bitez Yalısı Zeytin Ağacı (Olive tree at the waterside residence of Bitez)	Muğla	Tree	0.249	1995
47	Örümcek Ormanı Göknarı I (Fir I in Örümcek Forest)	Gümüşhane	Tree	0.249	1995
48	Örümcek Ormanı Göknarı II (Fir II in Örümcek Forest)	Gümüşhane	Tree	0.249	1995
49	Örümcek Ormanı Göknarı III (Fir III in Örümcek Forest)	Gümüşhane	Tree	0.249	1995
50	Örümcek Ormanı Göknarı IV (Fir IV in Örümcek Forest)	Gümüşhane	Tree	0.249	1995
51	Örümcek Ormanı Ladini I (Spruce I in Örümcek Forest)	Gümüşhane	Tree	0.249	1995
52	Örümcek Ormanı Ladini II (Spruce II in Örümcek Forest)	Gümüşhane	Tree	0.249	1995
53	Örümcek Ormanı Ladini III (Spruce III in Örümcek Forest)	Gümüşhane	Tree	0.249	1995
54	Örümcek Ormanı Ladini IV (Spruce IV in Örümcek Forest)	Gümüşhane	Tree	0.249	1995
55	Kadınlar Kuyusu Koca Menengici (Big old turpentine of Kadınlar Kuyusu)	İzmir	Tree	0.249	1995
56	Lake Meke	Konya	Landform	256.949	1998
57	Kabaardıç (Rough juniper)	Ankara	Tree	0.050	2000
58	Geyik Alanı (Geyik Alanı Grove)	Eskişehir	Forest	11.000	2000
59	Mut Yerkörü Waterfall	Mersin	Waterfall	11.572	2001
60	Atanın Ardıcı (Atatürk's juniper)	Erzincan	Tree	0.100	2002
61	Ballık Köyü Sediri (Cedar of Ballık village)	Burdur	Tree	0.100	2002
62	Evciler Köyü Sedir Ağacı (Cedar of Evciler village)	Burdur	Tree	0.100	2002
63	Kamilet Doğu Kayını (Oriental beech of Kamilet)	Artvin	Tree	0.100	2002
64	Kapıderesi Toros Sediri I (Taurus cedar I of Kapıderesi)	Isparta	Tree	0.100	2002
65	Kapıderesi Toros Sediri II (Taurus cedar II of Kapıderesi)	Isparta	Tree	0.100	2002
66	Kapıderesi Toros Sediri III (Taurus cedar III of Kapıderesi)	Isparta	Tree	0.100	2002
67	Kayadibi Porsuk Ağacı (Yew tree of Kayadibi)	Düzce	Tree	0.100	2002
68	Kırıntı Köyü Çınar Ağacı (Plane tree of Kırıntı village)	Isparta	Tree	0.100	2002
69	Kırıntı Köyü Doğu Çınarı (Oriental plane of Kırıntı village)	Isparta	Tree	0.100	2002
70	Kocapınar Toros Sediri (Taurus cedar of Kocapınar)	Burdur	Tree	0.100	2002
71	Koruluk Kermes Meşesi I (Palestine oak I of Koruluk)	Afyonkarahisar	Tree	0.100	2002
72	Koruluk Kermes Meşesi II (Palestine oak II of Koruluk)	Afyonkarahisar	Tree	0.100	2002
73	Koruluk Kermes Meşesi III (Palestine oak III of Koruluk)	Afyonkarahisar	Tree	0.100	2002
74	Küçükkapı Sedir Ağacı (Cedar of Küçükkapı)	Isparta	Tree	0.100	2002
75	Melodere Doğu Ladini (Oriental spruce) of Melodere)	Artvin	Tree	0.100	2002
76	Paşabükü Dişbudak Ağacı (Common ash) of Paşabükü)	Düzce	Tree	0.100	2002
77	Sırıkyayla Göknarı (Fir of Sırıkyayla)	Düzce	Tree	0.100	2002
78	Tota Dağı Anadolu Kestanesi (Sweet chestnut of Mount Tota)	Isparta	Tree	0.100	2002
79	Tota Dağı Ardıç Ağacı (Juniper of Mount Tota)	Isparta	Tree	0.100	2002
80	Yalnız Ardıç (Lone juniper)	Isparta	Tree	0.100	2002
81	Yaz Ihlamur Ağacı (Summer linden tree)	Isparta	Tree	0.100	2002
82	Acıkise Ardıç Ağacı (Juniper of Acıkise)	Adana	Tree	0.100	2002
83	Acıkise Doğu Çınarı (Oriental plane of Acıkise)	Adana	Tree	0.100	2002
84	Dibek Sedir Ağacı (Cedar of Dibek)	Antalya	Tree	0.100	2002
85	Koca Sedir Ağacı (Big old cedar)	Antalya	Tree	0.100	2002
86	Ağılı Ardıç (Poisonous juniper)	Konya	Tree	0.050	2002
87	Altıkardeşler Ardıç Ağacı (Juniper of Altıkardeşler)	Karaman	Tree	0.100	2002
88	Dedeardıç (Grandpa juniper)	Karaman	Tree	0.100	2002
89	Kandildere Ardıç Ağacı (Juniper of Kandildere)	Adana	Tree	0.100	2002
90	Dede Menengici (Grandpa turpentine tree of Kandildere)	İzmir	Tree	0.100	2003
91	Gedelma Çınarı (plane tree of Gedelma)	Antalya	Tree	0.100	2003
92	Karageyikli Türk Fındığı (urkish filbert of Karageyikli)	Eskişehir	Tree	0.100	2003
93	Kayı Ardıc (Kayı juniper)	Eskişehir	Tree	0.100	2003
94	Kepez Saçlı Meşesi (Turkey oak of Kepez)	Eskişehir	Tree	0.100	2003
95	Keramet Dutu (Mulberry tree)	Eskişehir	Tree	0.100	2003
96	Kokulu Ardıç I (Scented juniper I)	Eskişehir	Tree	0.100	2003
97	Kokulu Ardıç II (Scented juniper II)	Eskişehir	Tree	0.100	2003
98	Kokulu Ardıç III (Scented juniper III)	Eskişehir	Tree	0.100	2003
99	Onat Çınarı (Plane tree of Onat)	Hatay	Tree	0.100	2003
100	Piribaba Meşesi (Oak of Piribaba)	Eskişehir	Tree	0.100	2003
101	Yüzen Adalar (Floating islands (Bingöl))	Bingöl	Tree	38.400	2003
102	Nemrut Kalderası (Nemrut Caldera)	Bitlis	Landform	4,804.693	2003
103	Türbeçamı (Tomb pine)	Çankırı	Tree	0.100	2006
104	Doğanlı Çınarı (Plane tree of Doğanlı)	Adıyaman	Tree	0.100	2006
105	Gümeli (Gümeli Forest)	Zonguldak	Forest	249.085	2008
106	Bazalt Kayalıkları (Basalt Rocks)	Sinop	Landform	10.249	2011
107	Kula Hoodoos	Manisa	Landform	151.707	2012
108	Doğançay Waterfall	Sakarya	Waterfall	14.233	2013
109	Zeytintaşı Cave	Antalya	Cave	45.895	2013
110	Gilindire Cave	Mersin	Cave	106.594	2013
111	Kocain Cave	Antalya	Cave	60.806	2013
112	Derebucak Çamlık Caves	Konya	Cave	747.710	2013

== See also ==
- List of Intangible Cultural Heritage elements in Turkey
