= List of Ramsar sites in Turkey =

Protected areas of Turkey
| Type | Number | Area (ha) |
|---|---|---|
| National parks (list) | 52 | 3,287,103 |
| Marine parks (list) | 52 | 3,287,103 |
| Nature parks (list) | 274 | 94,294 |
| Nature preserve areas (list) | 32 | 56,386 |
| Wildlife protection areas (list) | 85 | 1,169,873 |
| Nature monuments (list) | 111 | 8,389 |
| Protected Plains (list) | 25 | 221,229 |
| Wetlands (National) | 59 | 869,697 |
| Wetlands (Local) | 65 | 142,184 |
| Other | 1,098 | 342,138 |
| Grand total | 1790 | 6,154,551 |
| Wetlands (Ramsar) (list) | 14 | 184,487 |

This is a list of Ramsar sites in Turkey. As of 2026, there are 14 Ramsar sites with a total area of 184,487 hectares (1,844.87 km^{2}), which were designated between 1994 and 2013.

== List of Ramsar sites ==
| Name | Image | Location | Area | Designated | Designation No. | Description |
|---|---|---|---|---|---|---|
| Akyatan Lagoon | | Adana | 14,700 hectares (147 km^{2}) | 15 April 1998 | 943 | |
| Gediz Delta | | İzmir | 14,900 hectares (149 km^{2}) | 15 April 1998 | 945 | |
| Göksu Delta | | Mersin | 15,000 hectares (150 km^{2}) | 13 July 1994 | 657 | |
| Kızılırmak Delta | | Samsun | 21,700 hectares (217 km^{2}) | 15 April 1998 | 942 | |
| Kızören Obrouk | | Konya | 127 hectares (1.27 km^{2}) | 2 May 2006 | 1620 | |
| Lake Burdur | | Burdur | 24,800 hectares (248 km^{2}) | 13 July 1994 | 658 | |
| Lake Kuş | | Balıkesir | 20,400 hectares (204 km^{2}) | 13 July 1994 | 660 | |
| Lake Kuyucuk | | Kars | 416 hectares (4.16 km^{2}) | 28 August 2009 | 1890 | |
| Lake Seyfe | | Kırşehir | 10,700 hectares (107 km^{2}) | 13 July 1994 | 659 | |
| Lake Uluabat | | Bursa | 19,900 hectares (199 km^{2}) | 15 April 1998 | 944 | |
| Meke Maar | | Konya | 202 hectares (2.02 km^{2}) | 21 July 2005 | 1618 | |
| Nemrut Caldera | | Bitlis | 4,589 hectares (45.89 km^{2}) | 14 April 2013 | 2145 | |
| Sultan Marshes | | Kayseri | 17,200 hectares (172 km^{2}) | 13 July 1994 | 661 | |
| Yumurtalık Lagoons | | Adana | 19,853 hectares (198.53 km^{2}) | 21 July 2005 | 1619 | |

=== Map of sites ===
Location of Ramsar sites in Turkey
