= Trembling aspen (Konya) =

Quaking aspen tree in Turkey

- Location within Turkey
- Species: Quaking aspen (Populus tremula)
- Coordinates: 37°37′56″N 31°42′16″E
- Height: 20 m (66 ft)
- Diameter: 2.50 m (8.2 ft)

Trembling aspen (Turkish: Titrek Kavak) is an old aspen tree in Konya Province, central Turkey. It is a registered natural monument of the country.

The trembling aspen is located inside the Yakamanastır Nature Park at Bademli village in Beyşehir district of Konya Province. Its distance to Bademli village is 3 km (1.9 mi) and to Beyşehir town 8 km (5.0 mi). It is a quaking aspen (Populus tremula). The tree is 20 m (66 ft) high, has a circumference of 8 m (26 ft) at 2.50 m (8.2 ft) diameter. Its age is dated to be about 100 years old. Lateral shoots of the old tree are broken by wind.

The tree was registered a natural monument on September 27, 1994. The protected area of the plant covers 2,490 m^{2} (26,800 sq ft).
