= Yenesu Cave =

Cave in Turkey

- Location within Turkey
- Location: Sarpdere, Demirköy, Kırklareli
- Coordinates: 41°37′09″N 27°56′32″E
- Length: 1,620 m (5,310 ft)
- Elevation: 140 m (460 ft)
- Show cave opened: 2005; 21 years ago

Yenesu Cave (Turkish: Yenesu Mağarası) is a cave in Kırklareli Province, northwestern Turkey.

== Location ==
The cave is situated 2 km (1.2 mi) east of Balkaya village and 20 km (12 mi) northeast of Vize town of Kırklareli Province. It is accessible on the route Vize-Kıyıköy, Kıyıköy-Aksicim-Balkaya or Saray-Bahçeköy-Aksicim-Balkaya. The cave is at an elevation of 140 m (460 ft) AMSL and about 5 m (16 ft) above the waterbed of nearby creek Yana Dere.

== Characteristcis ==
Yenisu Cave consists of two caves formed in two different geological ages, which are found at two levels. The main gallery, which follows a collapsed hall right at the entrance, is the most active part. Here, there are several ponds and lakes of 0.5–1.5 m (1.6–4.9 ft) depth with dripstones, stalactites, stalagmites and draperies. The cave's overall length is 1,620 m (5,310 ft).

The cave was explored by the geologists of the state-owned Mineral Research and Exploration Company (MTA). According to the deputy director of Culture and Tourism in Kırklareli, the opening of the cave to tourism in 2015 is projected. The visiting period is to be determined by the Nature Board of the province in accordance with the bat population in the cave.
