= İnsuyu Cave =

Show cave situated near Burdur in southwestern Turkey

- İnsuyu Mağarası
- Location within Turkey
- Location: Burdur, Turkey
- Coordinates: 37°39′34″N 30°22′27″E
- Length: 8,100 m (8,900 yd)
- Elevation: 1,230 m (4,040 ft) AMSL
- Discovery: 1952; 74 years ago by Temuçin Aygen
- Geology: Limestone
- Entrances: 2
- Show cave opened: 1966; 60 years ago
- Show cave length: 597 m (1,959 ft)
- Visitors: 65,378 (2011)

İnsuyu Cave (Turkish: İnsuyu Mağarası) is a show cave situated near Burdur in southwestern Turkey. Being over 500 m (1,600 ft) in length, it was discovered in 1952 and opened to public in 1965. A second cave beyond the show cave was later discovered. The lakes inside the both caves are in danger of drying due to excessive drilling of wells in the valley above. However, efforts are underway to reverse the process.

== Location ==
İnsuyu Cave is situated near the village of Çatalağıl in Burdur Province, 900 m (980 yd) away to the east of the state road D.650 at 13 km (8.1 mi) southeast of Burdur.

It is located at northeast of the Western Taurus Mountains at 1,230 m (4,040 ft) AMSL in Mediterranean Region, Turkey. Extending horizontally, it is a semi-active cave with underground water source showing very important features of its formation.

== Exploration and scientific research ==
Although well-known to local inhabitants for many generations, it wasn't discovered scientifically until 1952 by Temuçin Aygen (1921–2003) during hydrogeological surveys for the State Hydraulic Works (DSİ). First comprehensive exploration took place in 1953. It was opened to the public in 1966 as the country's first show cave. In 1976, it was registered by the Ministry of Culture and Tourism as a Natural Protected Area.

Famous French caver Norbert Casteret (1897–1987) praised the cave after his visit in 1966:

"I had the chance to explore and visit more than thousand caves in Europe, Africa, America and Asia. I can say that the Burdur Insuyu Cave is a first class and very interesting one. It offers to the visitors a rich decor, nice underground views and all the beauties of a boat ride on the cave lake. The large and deep lake at the end of the cave is most interesting and makes it the cave's focus point. Returning to the daylight after a short visit and a boat ride in the dark world, tourists will leave the cave with useful and unforgettable impressions."

In the 1970s, the cave became subject to extensive international scientific research. Italian arachnologist Paolo Marcello Brignoli (1942–1986) conducted research works on the cave's biospeleology (1968, 1971, 1972, 1973 and 1978), Austrian zoologist Friederike Spitzenberger (1939– ) researched bat suborders in 1973, Turkish geographist Korkut Ata Sungur (1935– ) its geology in 1974 and French geologist Jacques Choppy (1926–2004) the karstology of the cave in 1978.

In 1993, scientists from Süleyman Demirel University explored further galleries with branches and lakes beyond the "Great Lake". Explorations conducted between 2005 and 2007 yielded a new mapping of the cave. According to this map, the cave has a total length of 3,000 m (3,300 yd). The length of the cave measured over 12,000 m (13,000 yd) after four expeditions undertaken by 21 different spelaeologist groups in 2011 and 2012. The latest detailed map of the cave shows its length at 8,100 m (8,900 yd). It became certain that İnsuyu Cave is, with its latest explored gallery branches, much longer than its known and measured length.

In 2006, scientists from the Middle East Technical University conducted underwater and surface surveys in the lakes and prepared maps accurate to BCRA standards.

== Cave ==
İnsuyu Cave consists of two main interconnected galleries.

=== Show cave ===
The show cave is rich in formations such as stalactites, stalagmites, columns, walls, curtain dripstones and calcite crystals and has nine lakes inside. Major lakes are the 512 m^{2} (5,510 sq ft) large "Büyük Göl" ("Great Lake") as well as "Dilek Gölü" ("Desire Lake") and "Gazlı Göl" ("Gas Lake").

It has a total length of 597 m (1,959 ft) -according to one source 700 m (2,300 ft). However, access is up to 525 m (1,722 ft) only. The first gallery, extending parallel to the main fault line, has a rugged cage structure.

In 2011, the show cave was visited by 65,378 local and foreign tourists.

=== Second cave ===
The second cave, which was discovered as a result of groundwater lowering, is poor in terms of stalactite formations compared with the first section, although it is longer. To proceed through the second gallery is extremely difficult.

The second cave begins around 40 m (130 ft) east of the "Great Lake", and consists of three galleries extending to north, northeast and east. The north gallery is dry and ends in several branches beyond the "Kristal Göl" ("Crystal Lake") having a depth of around 40 m (130 ft). Crystal formations on the walls and the ceiling of the dry gallery are beautiful. The chamber between the north and northeast galleries is characterized by great number of blocks fallen from the ceiling.

There are four ponds and six lakes on the northeast gallery, namely "Umut Gölü" ("Lake of Hope") depth: ~25 m (82 ft), "Muz Gölü" ("Banane Lake") depth: ~15 m (49 ft), "Sonsuzluk Gölü" ("Lake of Eternity") depth: ~30 m (98 ft), "Gizemli Göl" ("Mysterious Lake") depth: ~8 m (26 ft), "Cumhur Gölü" ("Public Lake") depth: ~15 m (49 ft), "Dinginlik Gölü" ("Still Lake") depth: ~6 m (20 ft) and "Ya Sabır Gölü" ("Patience Lake") depth: ~15 m (49 ft). In this gallery, millipedes and rats were observed in addition to bats. The east gallery begins at a balcony over the "Lake of Hope", continues as a crack, which is so narrow that only one person can pass through, and then reaches a lake. It ends with two branches filled with water.

Visiting the second cave is permitted only for exploring, adventure and sports purposes in groups appropriately equipped with special caving gear. In 1985, a man-made entrance close to the natural mouth was opened for access to the second gallery.

== Geology ==
Lithologic units surrounding the cave are of autochthonous blocks and allochthonous blocks. Limestone is the common rock formation in the region of Burdur. Sinkholes were formed in the dissoluble limestone rock partly during the early karst, partly in Late Pleistocene and later. Intense chemical reaction results from the dissolution power of water near its freezing point determined by the climatic conditions in the region although the water has insufficient dissolved carbon dioxide.

The limestone formation over the cave is covered by a thin layer of soil, and the area is poor in flora. The region itself is full of sinkholes and holes formed in various stages of the early karst period. Wide-ranging chemical decomposition of the carbonate rocks in the area is visible although the Burdur region has a young appearance, geologically speaking. With its interesting features, the İnsuyu Cave is one of them.

İnsuyu Cave is a good example of the dissolution of calcium bicarbonate inside the limestone structure. The dissolution typically causes cracks along the weak veins. Dissolved material is transported by underground water. The limestone rock of the cave has a color ranging from white to light grey, and is composed of middle-sized crystals. The limestone rocks are overlaid as cliffs and reefs. Twisted layers and rugged surfaces are crisscrossed by calcite veins of about 2–3 cm (0.79–1.18 in) thickness.

== Hydrogeology ==
The structure of the region, which was formed by the geological evolution affecting the entire Taurus Mountains, is highly complex. This complex geology is an important factor controlling the movement of underground water, which is the main attraction of the cave. The subterranean river running in the cave, which was formed in the cracked limestone of the Cretaceous period, surfaces at an impervious Neogene layer at the level of Madıma Valley on the slope of Sarpgüney Hill. It is significant that the cave formation occurred in a multi phase. Erosion patterns visible on the walls and ceilings of today's dry chambers and galleries, which can only be formed by running water of high flow rate, are a sign for the formation of those parts under water.

Spongelike structures and forked gallery formation seen particularly on the eastern branch of the show cave is an indication of the formation of a phreatic zone.

The Burdur Provincial Culture and Tourism Directorate states on its article about the cave that "it is believed that some of the cave waters cure diabetes and stomach diseases."

== Criticism ==
The great number of artesian wells drilled for irrigation in Madıma Valley has caused the water table in the valley and the underground water level in the cave drop significantly. In 2013, it was reported that the depth of "Great Lake" decreased about 7 m (23 ft) from an initial 19 m (62 ft). "Great Lake" and "Desire Lake" in the show cave had become dry. It was feared that the remaining lakes were likely to dry out in the future, jeopardizing the tourist trade.

In December 2014, the Ministry of Forest and Water Management announced the initiation of an action plan for protection of the cave's ecosystem. In July 2015, it was reported that the water level at the "Great Lake" had risen again thanks to the contingency plan put into effect and seasonal rainfall.

== See also ==
- Geology of Turkey
