= Ayvaini Cave =

Cave in Bursa, Turkey

- Ayvaini Mağarası
- Location within Turkey
- Location: Bursa, Turkey
- Coordinates: 40°07′35″N 28°42′25″E
- Length: 4.86 km (3.02 mi)
- Discovery: 1970; 56 years ago
- Entrances: 2
- Entrances list: Ayvaköy and Doğanalanı

Ayvaini Cave is a cave situated southeast of Lake Uluabat at the district border between Mustafakemalpaşa and Nilüfer in Bursa, Turkey. The cave has two entrances, one in the village Ayvaköy and the other between the villages Ayvaköy and Doğanalan. It is named after the nearby village Ayvaköy.

It is possible to enter the cave at one entrance and leave it from the other. Cavers enter the cave through its upper entrance in Doğanalanı, where it starts with a 17 m (56 ft) descent. The otherwise horizontally developed cave has a length of 4.86 km (3.02 mi), which makes it the longest in southern Marmara Region and the eighth-longest in Turkey. The cave features speleothems such as stalagmites, stalactites, pillars, wall and drapery dripstones, and around 60 pools and ponds of size 3–4 m (9.8–13.1 ft). At the exit, the cave features a 400 m (1,300 ft)-long lake. The water level of the ponds and the lake varies depending on seasonal effects.

The cave was discovered by a team of three Spanish speleologists in 1970. There were plans to open the cave as a show cave around 2010. An elevated trail into the lower entrance was already planned. But in 2012 the Mağara Araştırmacıları Derneği Bursa Şubesi (Bursa Branch of Cave Researchers Association) objected to these plans with the argument that the cave will lose its naturalness and turn into a picnic area. All development plans were subsequently cancelled.
