= Hundred Horse Chestnut =

Largest and oldest known chestnut tree

Coordinates: 37°45′00.7″N 15°7′49.4″E

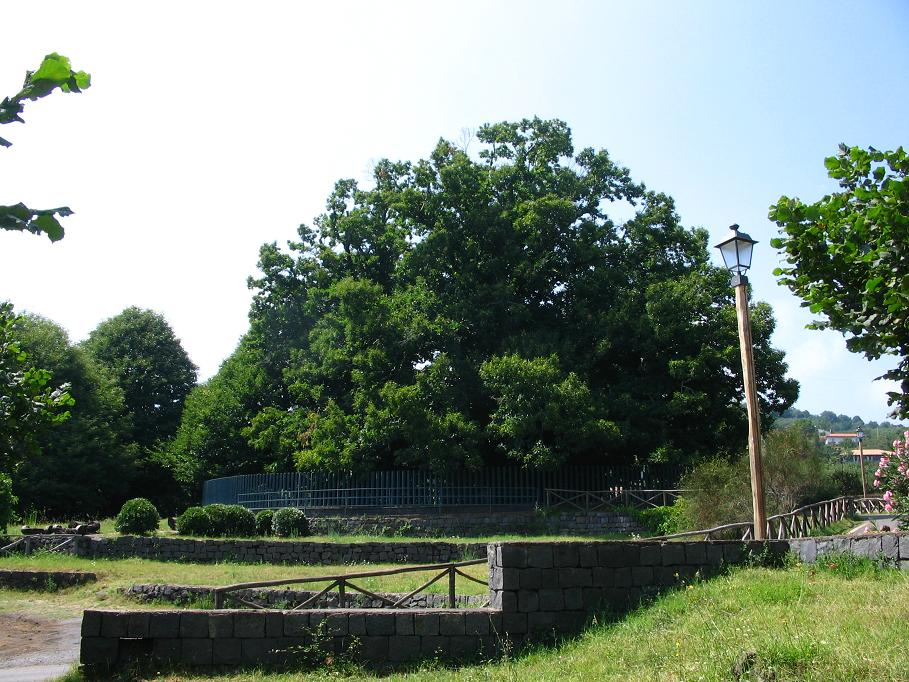
The tree in 2005

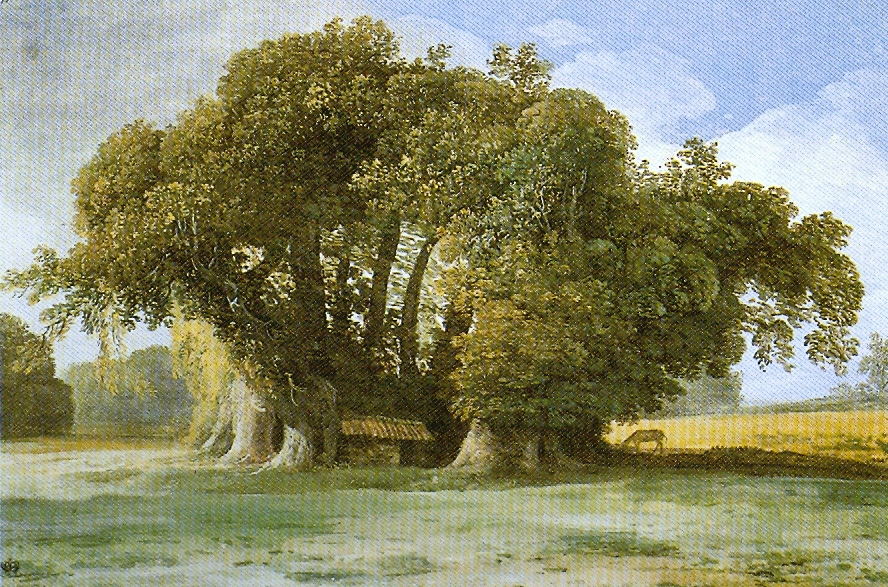
The tree in a gouache by Jean-Pierre Houël, around 1777

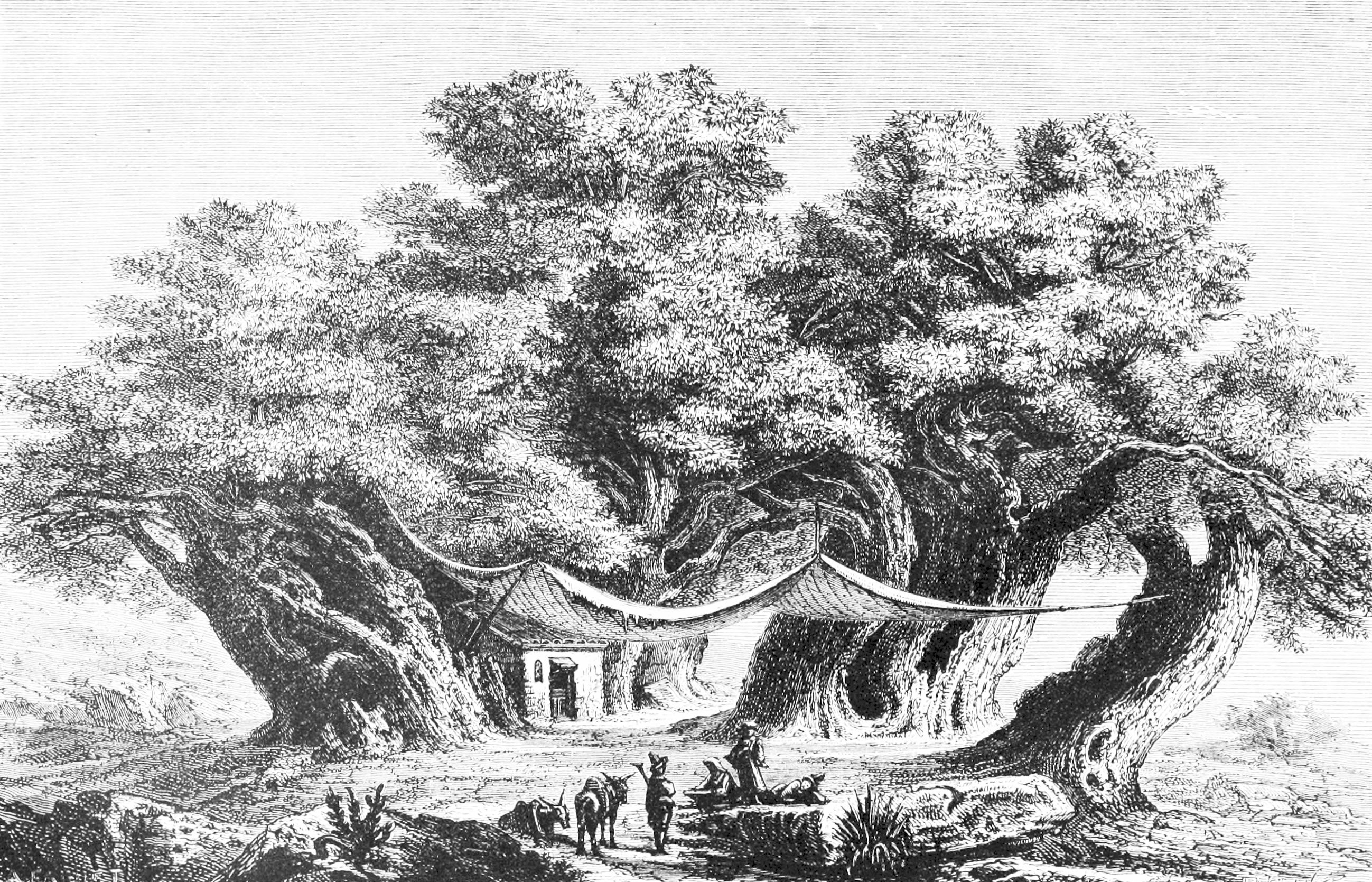
Engraved illustration from Popular Science monthly, circa 1872

The Hundred-Horse Chestnut (Italian: Castagno dei Cento Cavalli; Sicilian: Castagnu dî Centu Cavaḍḍi) is the largest and oldest known sweet chestnut (Castanea sativa, family Fagaceae) in the world.

Located on Linguaglossa road in Sant'Alfio, on the eastern slope of Mount Etna in Sicily — only 8 km (5 miles) from the volcano's crater — it is generally believed to be 2,000 to 4,000 years old (4,000 according to botanist Bruno Peyronel from Turin).

Guinness World Records has listed it for the record of "Greatest Tree Girth Ever", noting that it had a circumference of 57.9 m (190 ft) when it was measured in 1780. Above ground, the tree has since split into multiple large trunks, but below ground, these trunks still share the same roots. An early 1895 image with a man next to the tree for perspective shows it was closer to 10 m (33 ft) in diameter at breast height, rather than the claimed 18.5 m (61 ft) in diameter at breast height. At present time it has a girth (130 cm or 4 1/4 ft) circumference of 10.51 m (34 ft) and it is 19.42 m (64 ft) high.

Despite its name, the tree is not a horse chestnut. Rather, the tree's name originated from a legend in which a Spanish queen, Joanna of Castile, and her company of 100 knights, during a trip to Mount Etna, were caught in a severe thunderstorm. The entire company is said to have taken shelter under the tree.

== History ==
The tree is located in the wood of Carpineto, on the eastern slope of the Etna volcano, near zone D of the Etna park.

Authors of botany agree the chestnut tree is thousands of years old but do not agree on its exact age. It is likely between two and four thousand years old. The thesis of the Turin botanist Bruno Peyronel suggests it could be 3–4 thousand years old, making it the oldest tree in Europe and the largest in Italy (1982).

The first historical information on the Chestnut of the Hundred Horses is documented as early as the sixteenth century. In 1611 Antonio Filoteo spoke of it, while in 1636, in "Il Mongibello", Pietro Carrera majestically described the trunk and the tree "... capable of accommodating thirty horses inside".

On 21 August 1745, a first act was issued by the "Court of the Order of the Royal Heritage of Sicily", with which the Chestnut of the Hundred Horses and the nearby Chestnut Nave were institutionally protected. This law is one of the earliest acts of environmental protection in Sicily, if not the very first.

== Literary allusions ==
The tree and its legend have become the subject of various songs and poems, including the following Sicilian-language description by Catanese poet Giuseppe Borrello (1820–1894):

Un pedi di castagna
tantu grossu
ca ccu li rami so' forma un paracqua
sutta di cui si riparò di l'acqua,
di fùrmini, e saitti
la riggina Giuvanna
ccu centu cavaleri,
quannu ppi visitari Mungibeddu
vinni surprisa di lu timpurali.
D'allura si chiamò
st'àrvulu situatu 'ntra 'na valli
lu gran castagnu d'i centu cavalli.

Translation:

A chestnut tree
was so large
that its branches formed an umbrella
under which refuge was sought from the rain
from thunder bolts and flashes of lightning
by Queen Giuvanna
with a hundred knights,
when on her way to Mt Etna
was taken by surprise by a fierce storm.
From then on so was it named
this tree nestled in a valley and its courses
the great chestnut tree of one hundred horses.

Another poet from Catania in Sicily, Giuseppe Villaroel (1889–1965), described the tree in the following sonnet (written in Italian):

Dal tronco, enorme torre millenaria,
i verdi rami in folli ondeggiamenti,
sotto l'amplesso quèrulo dei venti,
svettano ne l'ampiezza alta de l'aria.
Urge la linfa, ne la statuaria
perplessità de le radici ergenti,
sotto i lacoontei contorcimenti,
dal suolo che s'intesse d'orticaria.
E l'albero - Briareo lignificato -
ne lo spasimo atroce che lo stringe
con catene invisibili alla terra,
tende le braccia multiple di sfinge
scagliando contro il cielo e contro il fato
una muta minaccia ebbra di guerra.

Translation:

From the trunk, huge millenary tower,
the green branches in mad waves,
under the chattery embrace of the winds,
lance into the air's tall expanse.
The sap rises in the statuesque
astonishment of erect roots,
under Laocoön-like contortions,
from a nettle-woven soil.
And the tree – wooden Briareus –
in the throes of the invisible
fetters that bind it to the earth,
strains its many limbs as a Sphinx
hurling against the sky and against fate
a voiceless threat sodden with war.

The 2018 novel The Overstory by American writer Richard Powers includes the line that: "Seven hundred years before, a chestnut in Sicily two hundred feet around sheltered a Spanish queen and her hundred mounted knights from a raging storm."

== See also ==
- Sweet chestnut of Gölcük Highland
- List of individual trees
- List of oldest trees
