= European route E981 =

Road in trans-European E-road network

E981

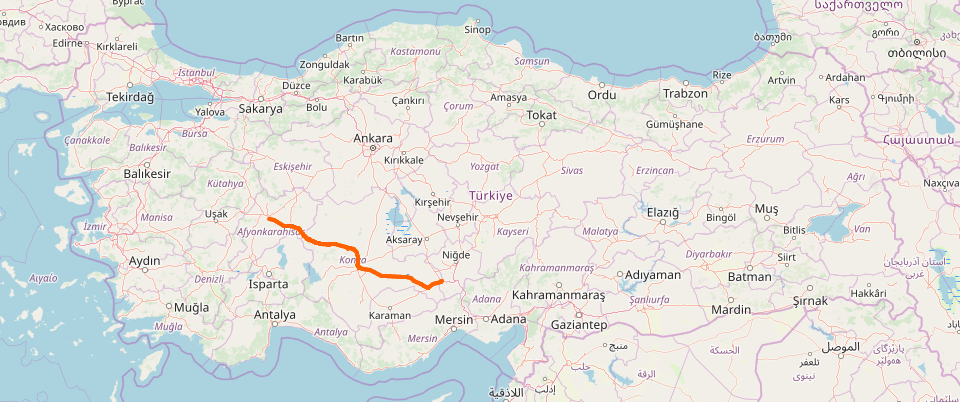

Major junctions
- From: Afyon
- To: Pozantı

Location
- Countries: Turkey

Highway system
- International E-road network; A Class; B Class

E 981 is a European B class road in Turkey, connecting the cities of Afyon and Pozantı.

== Route ==
- Turkey
  - Afyon – Konya – Aksaray – Pozantı
