= Zeytintaşı Cave =

Show cave in Antalya Province, southwestern Turkey

- Zeytintaşı Mağarası
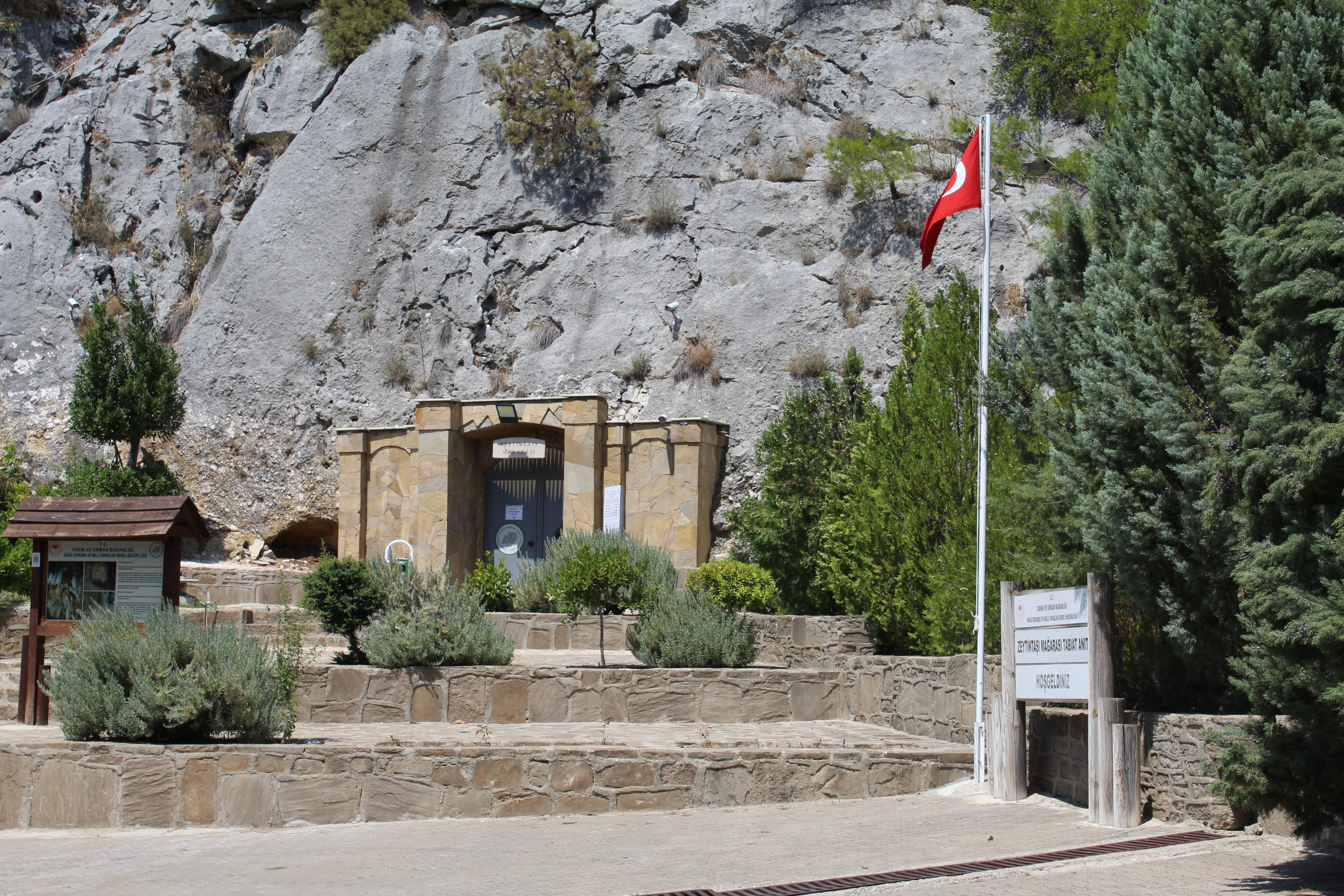
- Cave entry

- Location within Turkey
- Location: Akbaş village, Serik, Antalya Province, Turkey
- Coordinates: 37°02′49″N 31°06′38″E
- Depth: 14 m (46 ft)
- Length: 97 m (318 ft) and 136 m (446 ft)
- Elevation: 225 m (738 ft)
- Discovery: 1997
- Geology: Limestone
- Show cave opened: 2002

Zeytintaşı Cave (Turkish: Zeytintaşı Mağarası) is a show cave in Antalya Province, southwestern Turkey. It is a registered natural monument of the country.

The cave is located at Akbaş village in Serik district of Antalya Province. It is at an elevation of 225 m (738 ft) above main sea level on the slope of a hill. Its distance to Serik town is 16 km (9.9 mi) and to Antalya city is 54 km (34 mi). Tourist attraction Aspendos is 10 km (6.2 mi) far from the cave.

The cave is enclosed in impermeable limestone formation of Jurassic-Cretaceous period. It was formed on a distinct fault line in northwest-southeast direction. The cave has two interconnected levels with a depth of 14 m (46 ft). The lower gallery is 97 m (318 ft) long and the upper gallery is 136 m (446 ft) long. It features still active stalactites, stalagmites and columns. as well as soda straws of 3 cm (1.2 in) thickness and 70 cm (28 in) length. There are pools between columns.

The cave was discovered by the Turkish Highway Administration during preliminary works for road construction in 1997. The upper gallery was opened to public visit as a show cave in 2002. The soda straws inside the cave make it a rare example. Zeytintaşı Cave with its surrounding area of 45.895 ha (113.41 acres) was registered a natural monument on 27 June 2013.
