= Karain Cave =

Cave and archaeological site in southern Turkey

- Karain Mağarası (Turkish)
- Black Cave
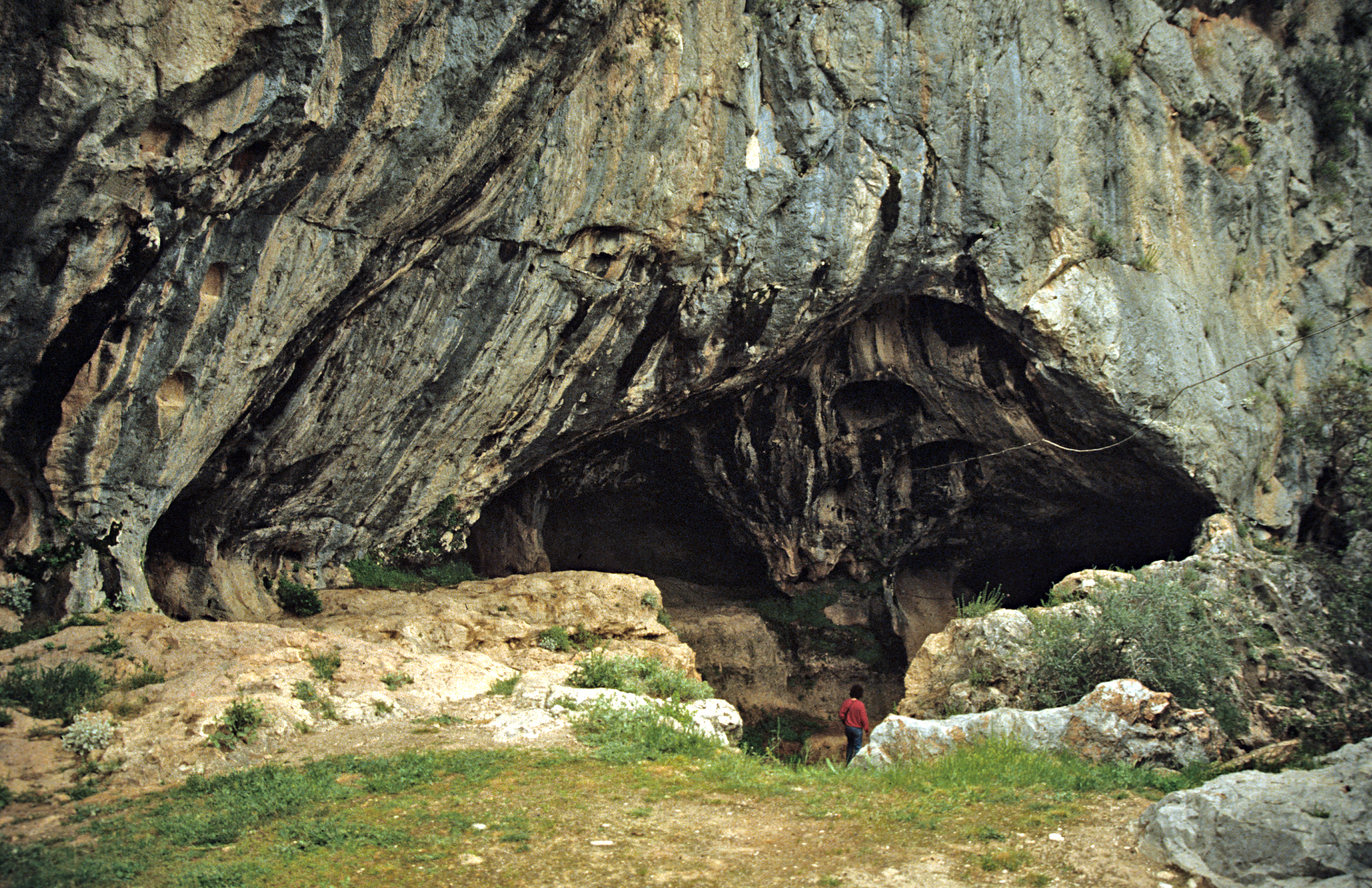
- entrance to Karain Cave

- Location in Turkey
- 37°4′40″N 30°34′15″E
- Type: karst
- Periods: Paleolithic to Iron Age
- Associated with: Neanderthals, Homo sapiens
- Location: Antalya, Turkey

Site notes
- Excavation dates: 1946 to 1958, 1967 to 1973, 1985 to 2008
- Archaeologists: Isin Yalcinkaya, İsmail Kılıç Kökten
- Public access: no

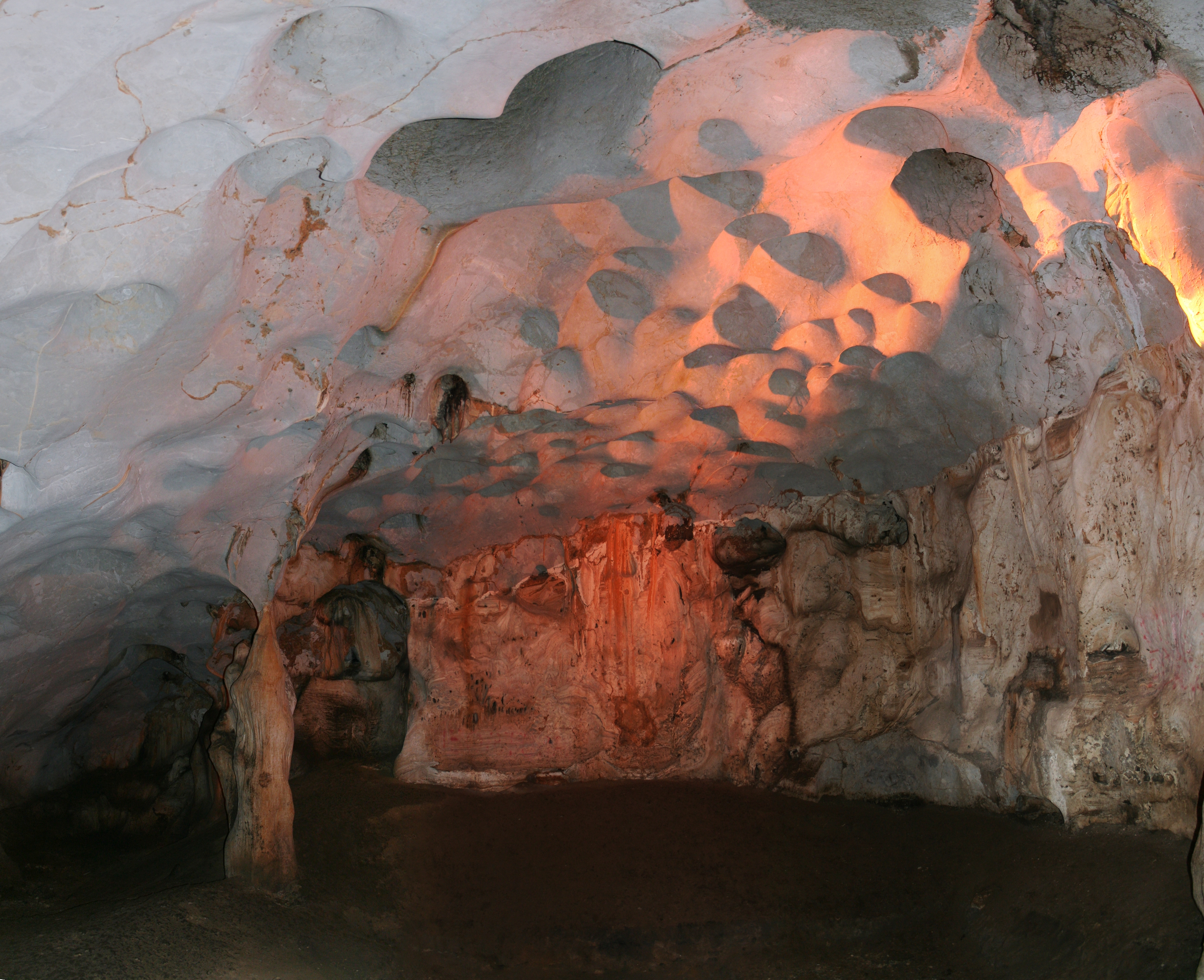
Second chamber

Karain Cave (Turkish: Karain Mağarası) is a Paleolithic archaeological site located at Yağca Village 27 km (17 mi) northwest of Antalya city in the Mediterranean region of Turkey.

== Overview ==
The Karain prehistoric site is situated 430 m (1,410 ft) above sea level and about 80 m (260 ft) above the eastern slope of Sam Dağı Mountain (Mount Katran), where the western Taurus Mountains calcareous zone borders on the Travertine Plain. Karain is a complex of caves that consists of three main chambers and corridors, separated by calcite walls, narrow curves and passageways. Halls and galleries contain speleothems.

=== Occupation ===
A fragment of a Neanderthal cranium discovered and dated confirms human habitation since the early Paleolithic age between 150,000 and 200,000 years ago. Researchers documented the continuity of human presence in the cave for a period of more than 25,000 years, from the Mesolithic, through the Neolithic and the Chalcolithic, to the Bronze Age. It is assumed that during the time of Greek colonization of Asia Minor (Iron Age), the cave had a religious function, as Greek inscriptions and decorations suggest, that are carved into the rock in front of the entrance.

=== Artifacts ===
Paleolithic and Neolithic flint blades, scrapers and arrowheads, some made in Levallois technique were discovered. In the subsequent layers lithic figurines and bone sculptures have been found, that suggest relations to the nearby Hacilar culture. The attention of researchers was especially drawn to the carving of a human face, stylistically similar to the products of the Natufian culture which flourished in the Levant during the Mesolithic period. This discovery may corroborate a commercial relationship of the population of southern Asia Minor and Palestine.

The Museum of Anatolian Civilizations hosts an extensive collection of Karain artifacts.
