= Ramsar Convention =

International treaty for the conservation and sustainable utilization of wetlands

Ramsar Convention on Wetlands of International Importance Especially as Waterfowl Habitat
- Ramsar logo
- Signed: 2 February 1971
- Location: Ramsar, Iran
- Effective: 21 December 1975
- Condition: Ratification by 7 states
- Signatories: 23
- Parties: 172
- Depositary: Director General of UNESCO
- Languages: English (prevailing in case of divergence), French, German, Russian and Spanish

The Ramsar Convention on Wetlands of International Importance Especially as Waterfowl Habitat is an international treaty for the conservation and sustainable use of Ramsar sites (wetlands). It is also known as the Convention on Wetlands. It is named after the city of Ramsar in Iran, where the convention was signed in 1971.

Every three years, representatives of the contracting parties meet as the Conference of the Contracting Parties (COP), the policy-making organ of the convention which adopts decisions (site designations, resolutions and recommendations) to administer the work of the convention and improve the way in which the parties are able to implement its objectives. In 2022, COP15 was held in Montreal, Canada.

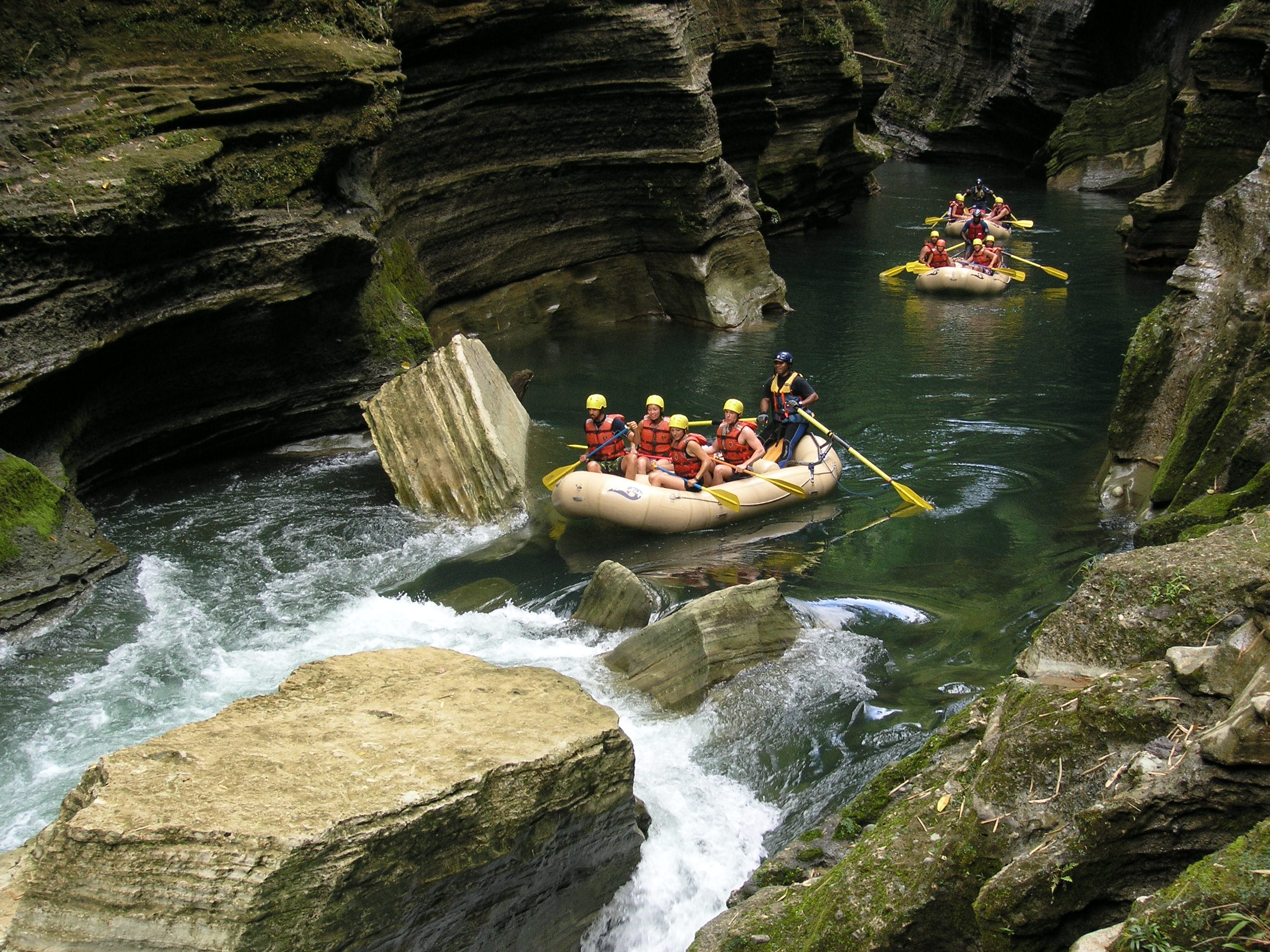
The Upper Navua Conservation Area Ramsar site in Fiji

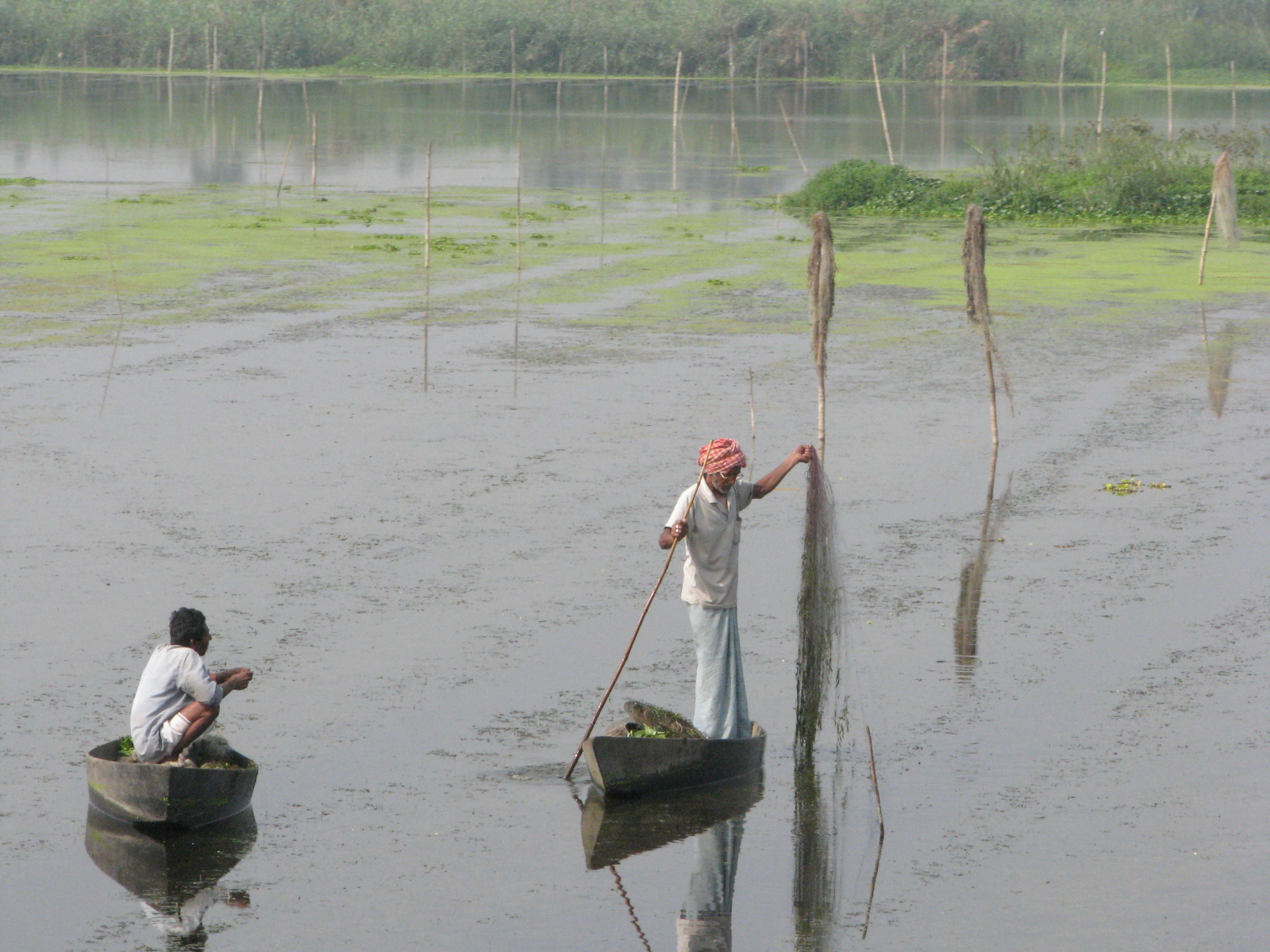
Sustainable fishing in India, an example of wise use

== List of wetlands of international importance ==
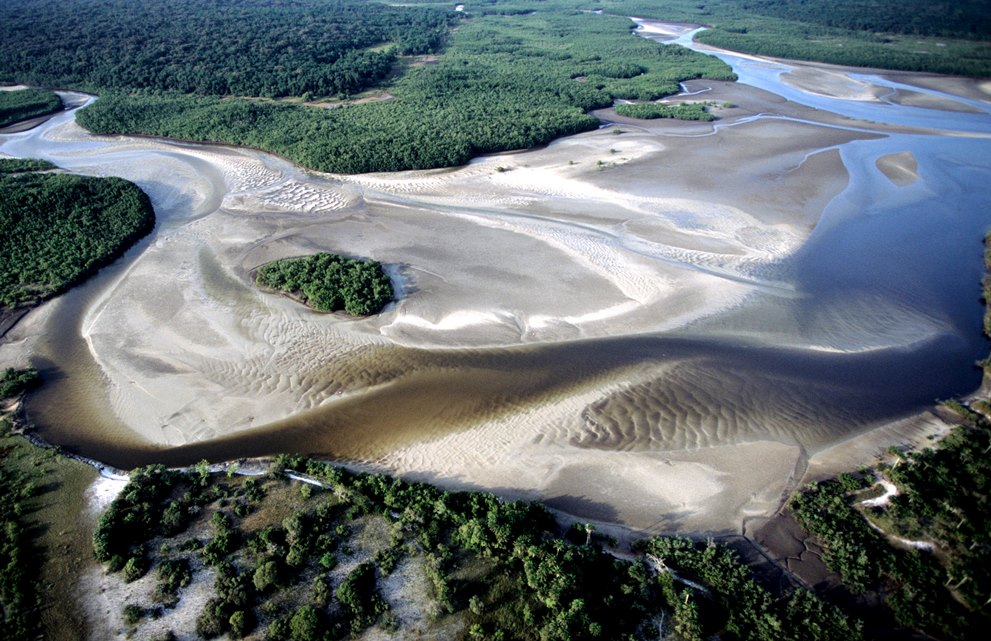
Archipel Bolama-Bijagos Ramsar site in Guinea-Bissau

The list of wetlands of international importance included 2,531 Ramsar sites in February 2025 covering over 2.6 million square kilometres (1,000,000 sq mi). The countries with most sites are the United Kingdom with 175 and Mexico with 142. The country with the largest surface area of listed wetland is Brazil, with around 267,000 square kilometres (103,000 sq mi).

The Ramsar Sites Information Service (RSIS) is a searchable database which provides information on each Ramsar site.

== International cooperation ==
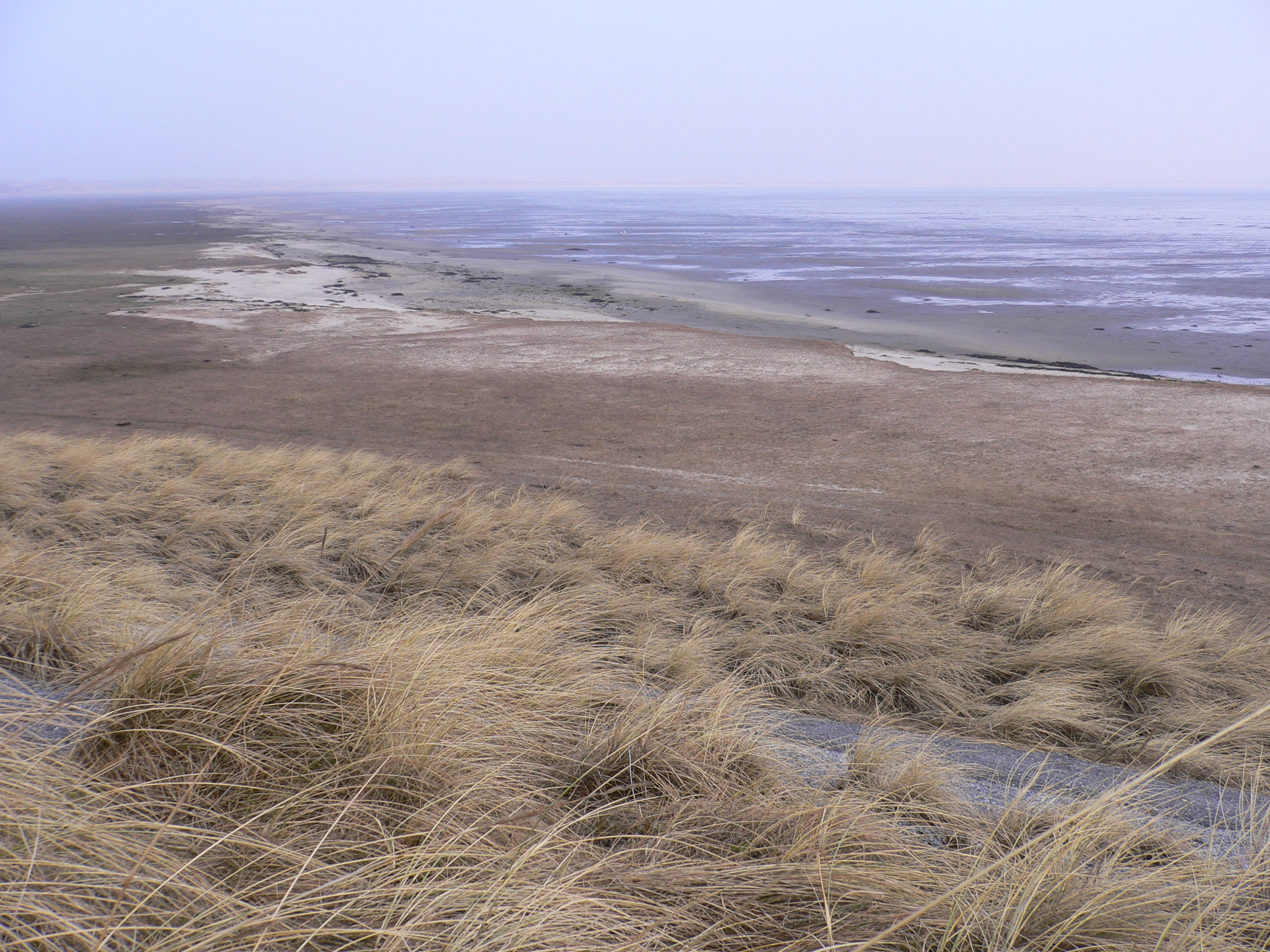
The Wadden Sea is a transboundary Ramsar site in Denmark, Germany and the Netherlands.

As of 2016 there are 18 transboundary Ramsar sites, and 15 Ramsar regional initiatives covering regions of the Mediterranean, Asia, Africa, and South America.

=== International organization partners ===
The Ramsar Convention works closely with six other organisations known as international organization partners (IOPs). These are:

- BirdLife International
- International Union for Conservation of Nature (IUCN)
- International Water Management Institute (IWMI)
- Wetlands International
- WWF International
- Wildfowl & Wetlands Trust (WWT)

These organizations support the work of the convention by providing expert technical advice, helping implement field studies, and providing financial support. The IOPs also participate regularly as observers in all meetings of the conference of the parties and as full members of the Scientific and Technical Review Panel.

=== Other partners ===
The convention collaborates with a network of partners:

- Biodiversity-related conventions including the Convention on Biological Diversity (CBD), the Convention to Combat Desertification (UNCCD), Convention on Migratory Species (CMS), the World Heritage Convention (WHC), and the Convention on International Trade in Endangered Species (CITES);
- Project funding bodies including global environmental funds, multilateral development banks and bilateral donors;
- UN agencies such as UNEP, UNDP, UNESCO, and the UN Economic Commission for Europe, and specific programmes such as UNESCO's Man and the Biosphere Programme (MAB);
- Non-governmental organizations including the Nature Conservancy, Conservation International, the Society of Wetland Scientists, the International Association for Impact Assessment, and many others;
- Since 1998 the convention has also benefited from a strong partnership with Danone including the Évian brand, and since 2007 from the Biosphere Connections partnership with the Star Alliance airline network.

== Bodies established by the convention ==
=== Conference of the Contracting Parties ===
This is the convention's governing body consisting of all governments that have ratified the treaty. This ultimate authority reviews progress under the convention, identifies new priorities, and sets work plans for members. The COP can also make amendments to the convention, create expert advisory bodies, review progress reports by member nations, and collaborate with other international organizations and agreements.

=== The Standing Committee ===
The Standing Committee is the intersessional executive body which represents the COP between its triennial meetings, within the framework of the decisions made by the COP. The contracting parties that are members of the Standing Committee are elected by each meeting of the COP to serve for the three years.

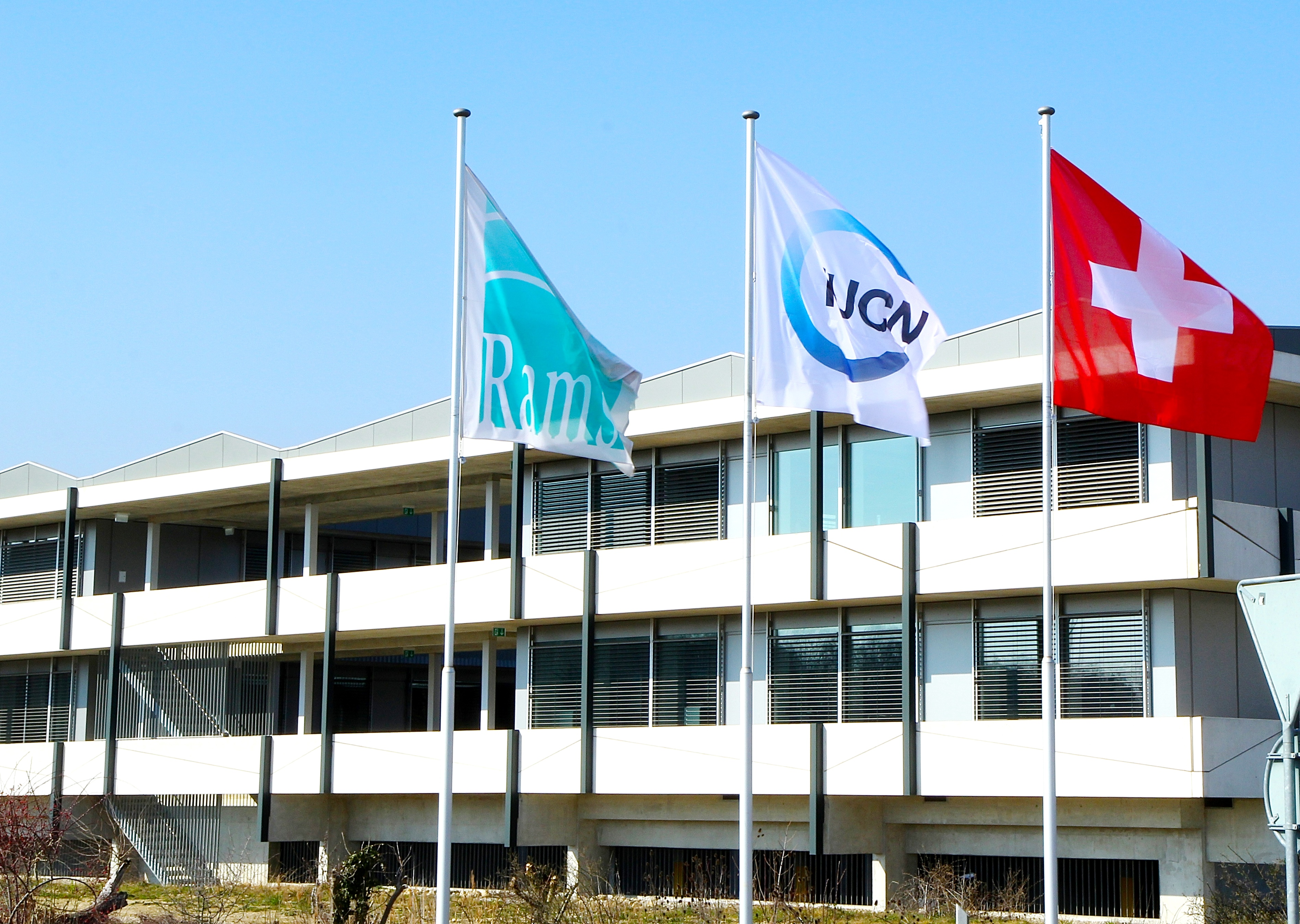
The Ramsar Secretariat offices in Gland, Switzerland

=== The Scientific and Technical Review Panel ===
The Scientific and Technical Review Panel (STRP) provides scientific and technical guidance to the Conference of Contracting Parties, the Standing Committee, and the Ramsar Secretariat. In 2025 the chair of the STRP presented the panels' report, Global Wetland Outlook 2025, to the UN.

=== The Secretariat ===
The Secretariat carries out the day-to-day coordination of the convention's activities. It is based at the headquarters of the International Union for Conservation of Nature (IUCN) in Gland, Switzerland.

The implementation of the Ramsar Convention is a continuing partnership between the Conference of Contracting Parties, the Standing Committee, and the Secretariat, with the advice of the subsidiary expert body, the Scientific and Technical Review Panel (STRP), and the support of the international organization partners (IOPs).

Musonda Mumba is the seventh secretary general of the Ramsar Convention on Wetlands.

== World Wetlands Day ==
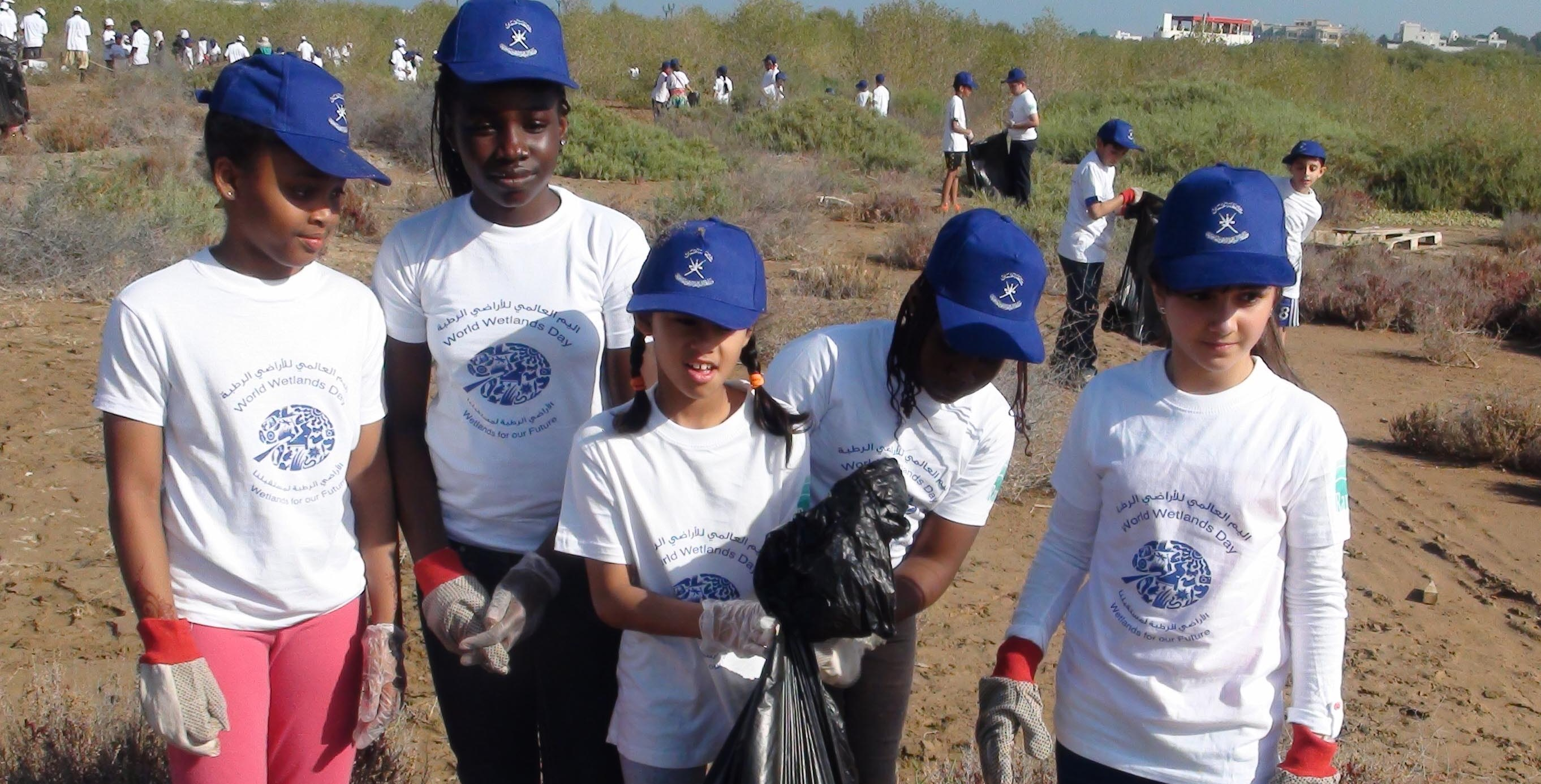
A wetland clean-up in Oman on World Wetlands Day

February 2 is World Wetlands Day, marking the convention's adoption on 2 February 1971. Established to raise awareness about the value of wetlands for humanity and the planet, WWD was celebrated for the first time in 1997, and has grown since then. In 2015 World Wetlands Day was celebrated in 59 countries.

== History ==
The convention was co-founded by Eskandar Firouz (former environment minister of Iran), Luc Hoffmann of Tour du Valat research station in the Camargue in France, and Geoffrey Matthews of the Wildfowl & Wetlands Trust at Slimbridge, England in the late 1960s. The conference, which adopted the terms of the agreement, was held in the Iranian Caspian Sea resort of Ramsar on 2 February 1971. The convention turned 50 in 2021.

== Deficiencies in the treaty and its implementation ==
Despite its quasi-universal application, the domestic response to this treaty is often half-hearted and inadequate. By way of example, Germany joined the Convention in 1976 and has, "[as of 2022], failed to give effect to the Ramsar Convention in the manner set out by the constitution of Germany." As of 2025 Turkey does not always publish its wetland management plans, for example the Kızılırmak Delta has a plan but it is not published. (Note: Countries must plan for their Ramsar sites but are only encouraged to publish)

== See also ==
- Ramsar classification system
- Montreux Record – threat classification for wetlands
- Ramsar Wetland Conservation Award
- List of international environmental agreements
- World Heritage Site – international agreement on historic site recognition
