= Aleutian World War II National Historic Area =

U.S National Historic Site in Alaska

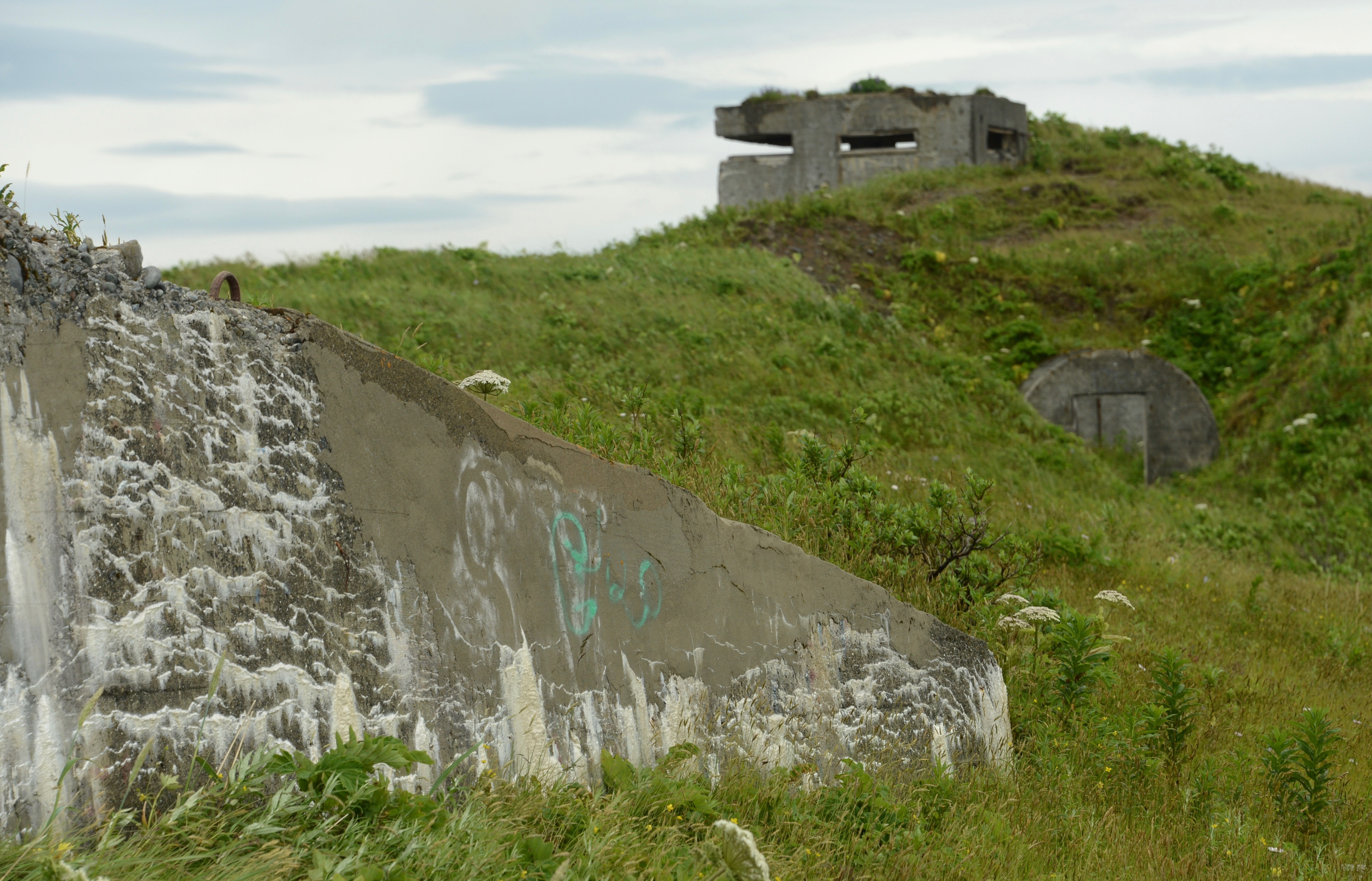
- Coastal defense bunker at Fort Schwatka

- Location within Alaska
- Location: Unalaska, Alaska
- Nearest city: Anchorage, Alaska
- Coordinates: 53°53′20″N 166°31′38″W
- Designation: National Park Service affiliated area
- Authorized: November 12, 1996
- Owner: Ounalashka Corporation
- Website: Aleutian World War II National Historic Area

The Aleutian World War II National Historic Area is a U.S. National Historic Site on Amaknak Island in the Aleutian Island Chain of Alaska. It offers visitors a glimpse of both natural and cultural history, and traces the historic footprints of the U.S. Army Base, Fort Schwatka, located at the Ulakta Head on Mount Ballyhoo. The fort, 800 miles west of Anchorage, the nearest large urban center, was one of four coastal defense posts built to protect Dutch Harbor (crucial back door to the United States) during World War II; Fort Schwatka is also the highest coastal battery ever constructed in the United States. The other Army coastal defense facilities were Fort Mears, Fort Learnard, and Fort Brumback. Engineers designed the concrete observation posts and command stations to withstand earthquakes and 100 mph winds. Although today, many of the bunkers and wooden structures of Fort Schwatka have collapsed, the gun mounts and lookouts are among the most intact in the country.

In 1996, the United States Congress designated this a National Historic Area as a way of educating future generations both about the history of the Aleut people, and the role the Aleutian Islands played in the defense of the United States in World War II. It is owned and operated by the Ounalashka Corporation but as an affiliated area of the National Park Service receives funding and technical assistance for development and preservation.

== History and culture of the Aleut people ==
The Unangan or Aleut people (as they came to be called) were once quite plentiful in their native corner of Alaska. But within 45 years after Russian contact, their number plummeted to a mere few thousand—the population had become decimated by warfare, epidemics, starvation and the exploitation of Russian fur traders. The Russian monarchy attempted to enforce fair treatment, but it was not until the arrival of the Russian Orthodox Church in the 1800s (decade) that the Aleuts' rights were argued in Russian courts.

The Russian Orthodox Church did much to alleviate the ills of colonization. Churches became the most prominent village structure and the focus of community life. Aleuts served as lay readers. They formed choirs, practicing the Orthodox liturgy in their own Aleut tongue. The Church became a sanctuary, its icons representing a spiritual dimension transcending the often harsh realities of life. The Russian Orthodox faith remains a dominant force in modern Aleut culture. The present day Church of the Holy Ascension, built in 1895, is a National Historic Landmark. In 1996, the World Monuments Watch—a highly selective listing that includes India's Taj Mahal—designated the church's 250 religious icons one of the world's 100 most endangered sites.

After the purchase of Alaska by the United States in 1867, the Aleut found themselves classified as "Indians" and made wards of the government. Some Aleut worked fox and sheep farms for wages, others became construction workers or longshoremen, but almost all still looked to the sea for sustenance. The Aleuts' hardships lasted for over two centuries, culminating finally in the forced evacuation from their homeland during World War II. This was when the unique geography of the Aleutian Islands—the link between east and west—again played a pivotal role in the area's history.

== World War II ==
At the outbreak of World War II, the Imperial Japanese Naval Base of Paramushiro lay only 650 miles southwest of Attu Island, the westernmost island in the Aleutian chain. Both the Attuans and the Aleutian Islanders in general were wary of their proximity to this Japanese installation. "Some day they (will) come to Attu," predicted Attuan Michael Hodikoff. On June 7, 1942, Japanese forces invaded the United States by attacking and occupying this small island along with Kiska as part of the Aleutian Islands Campaign, initially a diversion for the Battle of Midway. This changed forever not only the lives of the 42 Attuan villagers taken as prisoners-of-war, but the Aleut people as a whole.

In response to this Japanese aggression, U.S. authorities evacuated 881 Aleuts from nine villages. They were herded from their homes onto cramped transport ships, most allowed only a single suitcase. Heartbroken, Atka villagers watched as U.S. servicemen set their homes and church afire so they would not fall into Japanese hands.

The Aleuts were transported to Southeast Alaska and crowded into "duration villages." Conditions were harsh as there was no plumbing, electricity or winter clothes. Camp food was poor and the water was tainted. Medical care was inadequate, and pneumonia and tuberculosis were rampant.

In mid-1942 through mid-1943 Dutch Harbor was a submarine base, allowing short-ranged S-boats to patrol in Japanese home waters. By mid-1943 many more long-range submarines (such as the Gato-class) were built. These were based elsewhere, and the S-boats were withdrawn for use as training submarines.

== See also ==
- Aleutian Islands World War II National Monument
