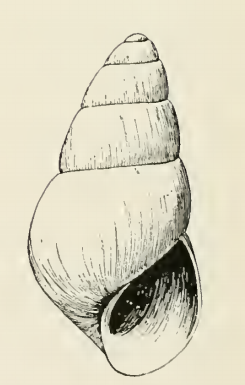
- Apertural view of a shell of Odostomia silana

Scientific classification
- Kingdom: Animalia
- Phylum: Mollusca
- Class: Gastropoda
- Family: Pyramidellidae
- Genus: Odostomia
- Species: O. sillana

Binomial name
- Odostomia sillana Dall & Bartsch, 1909

Synonyms
- Aartsenia silana (Dall & Bartsch, 1909); Odostomia (Amaura) silana Dall & Bartsch, 1909

= Odostomia sillana =

Species of gastropod

Odostomia sillana is a species of sea snail, a marine gastropod mollusc in the family Pyramidellidae, the pyrams and their allies.

== Description ==
The short, yellowish white shell has a conic shape. (The whorls of the protoconch of the type specimen are eroded). Its length measures 5.6 mm. The 5½ whorls of the teleoconch are well rounded, slightly overhanging. The summits of the whorls are appressed. The whorls are marked by almost vertical lines of growth and numerous closely spaced, wavy, microscopic, spiral striations. The suture is well marked. The periphery of the body whorl is well rounded. The inflated base of the shell is rather short, narrowly umbilicated and marked like the spire. The aperture is broadly ovate, somewhat effuse anteriorly. The posterior angle is acute. The outer lip is thin, and strongly curved in the middle. The columella is slender, strongly curved and reflected anteriorly. It is provided with a weak fold near its insertion. The parietal wall is glazed by a thin callus.

== Distribution ==
This marine species occurs off Amaknak Island, Alaska.
