= Dutch Harbor Naval Operating Base and Fort Mears, U.S. Army =

- U.S. National Register of Historic Places
- U.S. National Historic Landmark District
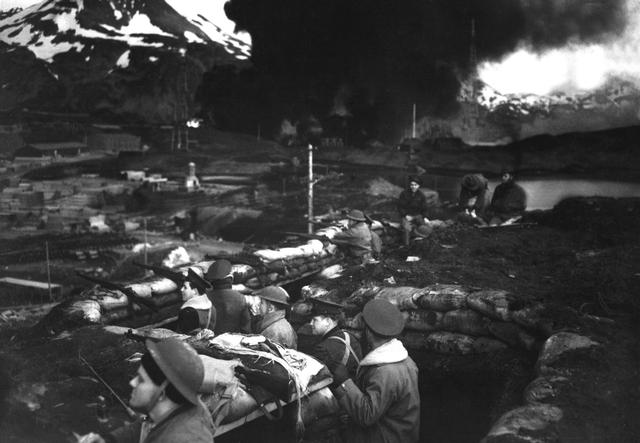
- Japanese attack on Dutch Harbor, June 3, 1942. Group of Marines on the alert between attacks

- Location within Alaska
- Location: Dutch Harbor, Unalaska, Alaska
- Coordinates: 53°53′17″N 166°32′31″W
- Area: 1,000 acres (400 ha)
- Built: 1940
- NRHP reference No.: 85002733

Significant dates
- Added to NRHP: February 4, 1985
- Designated NHLD: February 4, 1985

The Dutch Harbor Naval Operating Base and Fort Mears were the two military installations built next to each other in Dutch Harbor, on Amaknak Island of the Aleutian Islands in Alaska, by the United States in response to the growing war threat with Imperial Japan during World War II. In 1938, the Navy Board recommended the construction which began in July 1940. The first United States Army troops arrived in June 1941 and an air base constructed by the United States Navy was finished in September 1941. At the time of the surprise attack on Pearl Harbor, these were the only military installations in the Aleutian Islands.

On June 3–4, 1942, the two bases were bombed by Japanese planes operating from two aircraft carriers in a two-day event known as the Battle of Dutch Harbor, marking the first enemy aircraft strike on the American continent in history.

== Description ==
Dutch Harbor occupies the central portion of Amaknak Island, a small island in Unalaska Bay which is separated from the larger Unalaska Island by Iliuliuk Bay. The two islands are joined by a bridge connecting the city of Unalaska to the southern portion of Amaknak Island. During World War II the entirety of Amaknak Island was used by the United States Navy as an operating base, and by the United States Army, which manned coastal defenses on the high ground at the northern and southern parts of the island. The central portion of the island was occupied by the facilities of the naval base, which included a runway and other aircraft support facilities, munitions storage facilities, barracks, a hospital, and a bomb-proof power plant. South of the naval base was Fort Mears, (named in tribute to Frederick Mears) which primarily consisted of barracks for the troops manning the coastal defenses. The coastal defenses included batteries placed to the north on Ulakta Head and Mount Ballyhoo, and to the south on what the army called Hill 400, but is now known as Bunker Hill for its surviving structures.

Other Army coastal defense facilities at and near Dutch Harbor included Fort Schwatka, Fort Learnard, and Fort Brumback.

== Battle of Dutch Harbor ==
On June 3, 1942, the Japanese Navy attacked Dutch Harbor in the first aerial attack on the continental United States during the American/Pacific theaters of World War II. Originally planned to start at the same time as the Battle of Midway, it occurred a day earlier due to one-day delay in the sailing of Nagumo's task force. Forty-three Americans and at least ten Japanese died during the attacks, which lasted for two days. The base remained an important part of coastal defenses for the remainder of World War II.

== Postwar contamination ==
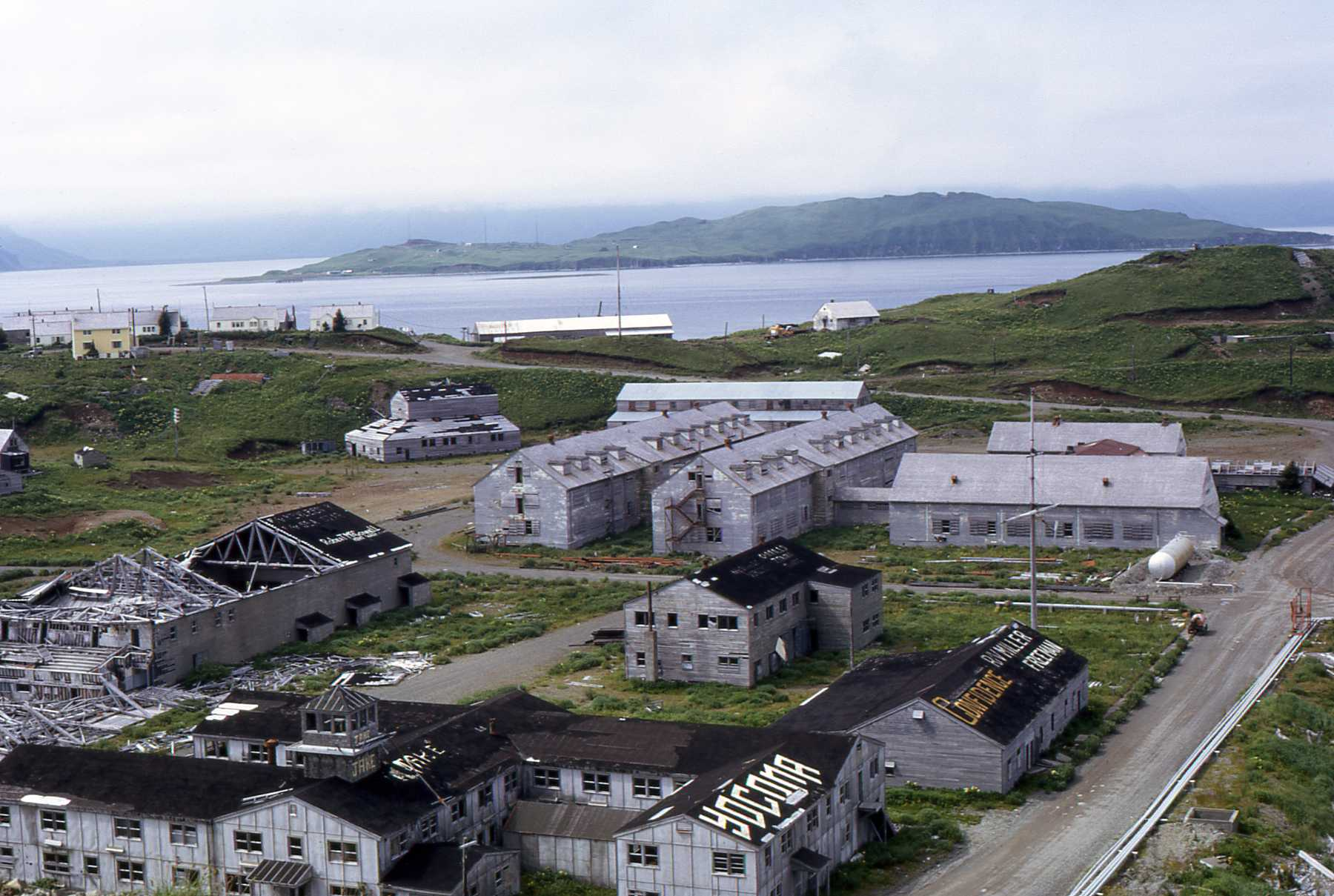
What remains of the Naval Base and Fort Mears

Shortly after the end of World War II, the U.S. military abandoned its Dutch Harbor outposts. For decades, the buildings remained standing, generally abandoned. With the growth of the king crab fishery in the 1970s, many of these buildings were used as warehouses, bunkhouses, and family homes.

In the late 1980s, the U.S. government finally funded a cleanup of the derelict fort, and the area was turned over for commercial use.

As of 2026, the cleanup of the FUDS has not been completed and are threatened by budget cut backs for the U.S. Army Corps of Engineers. Summer Bay, Humpy Cove, Alaska and Little South America were the most recent clean up sites, mostly underground petroleum storage tanks from WWII.

== See also ==
- Aleutian World War II National Historic Area
- List of National Historic Landmarks in Alaska
- National Register of Historic Places listings in Aleutians West Census Area, Alaska
