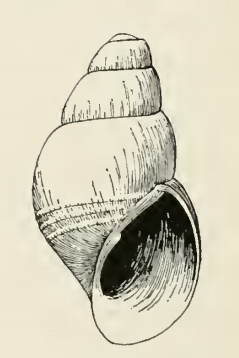
- Apertural view of a shell of Odostomia septentrionalis

Scientific classification
- Kingdom: Animalia
- Phylum: Mollusca
- Class: Gastropoda
- Family: Pyramidellidae
- Genus: Odostomia
- Species: O. septentrionalis

Binomial name
- Odostomia septentrionalis Dall & Bartsch, 1909

Synonyms
- Evalea septentrionalis (Dall & Bartsch, 1909); Odostomia (Evalea) septentrionalis Dall & Bartsch, 1909

= Odostomia septentrionalis =

Species of gastropod

Odostomia septentrionalis is a species of sea snail, a marine gastropod mollusc in the family Pyramidellidae, the pyrams and their allies.

== Description ==
The thin, soiled yellowish white shell is very elongate and has an ovate shape. Its length measures 4.3 mm. It is umbilicated. The whorls of the protoconch are small, smooth, very obliquely, deeply immersed in the first of the succeeding turns. The five whorls of the teleoconch are inflated, well rounded, their summits appressed. They are marked by fine, retractive lines of growth and numerous fine, wavy, spiral striations between the sutures and on the base. The posterior half of the base has, in addition to the above marking, three broad, low, feeble, raised, spiral threads. The umbilicus is very narrow. The aperture is large, very regularly oval. The posterior angle is obtuse. The thin outer lip is bending strongly outward in a broad sweeping curve. The long columella is slender, and regularly curved. It is moderately reflected, and not reinforced by the base. It is provided with a feeble oblique fold at its insertion. The parietal wall is glazed with a thin callus.

== Distribution ==
This marine species occurs off Unalaska, Alaska.
