= Ounalashka Corporation =

Native village corporation in Alaska

The Ounalashka Corporation is the native village corporation for the Aleuts of Unalaska and Amaknak Islands, in the Aleutian Islands. Like its parent entity, the Aleut Corporation, it was formed as a result of the Alaska Native Claims Settlement Act of 1971. Its headquarters are located in Unalaska, Alaska.

The Ounalashka Corporation has a significantly greater control over the economy and development of Unalaska than do many of the other village corporations in Alaska, due to the severely limited amount of land suitable for development on the island, and the high percentage of that land that the corporation owns. To maintain that control, the Corporation has a policy of never selling any portion of its land, though it does issue leases for as long as 50 years. Since consolidating its holdings in the late 1970s, it has become nearly impossible to plan any new development in Unalaska without the authorization of the Corporation.
