= Unalaska City School District =

School district in Alaska, United States

Address
- 55 East Broadway Street Unalaska, Alaska, 99685; United States

District information
- Type: Public
- Grades: PreK–12
- NCES District ID: 0200720

Students and staff
- Students: 337
- Teachers: 26.1
- Staff: 34.43
- Student–teacher ratio: 12.91

Other information
- Website: www.ucsd.net

Unalaska City School District (UCSD) is a school district headquartered in Unalaska, Alaska.

There are two schools:

- Eagles View Elementary Achigaalux
- Unalaska City High School

Circa October 1978 the district had 15 teachers and 140 students. In school year 2024-2025, the Average Daily Membership for the district was 332.35.
