= Mount Ballyhoo =

Mountain in Alaska, United States

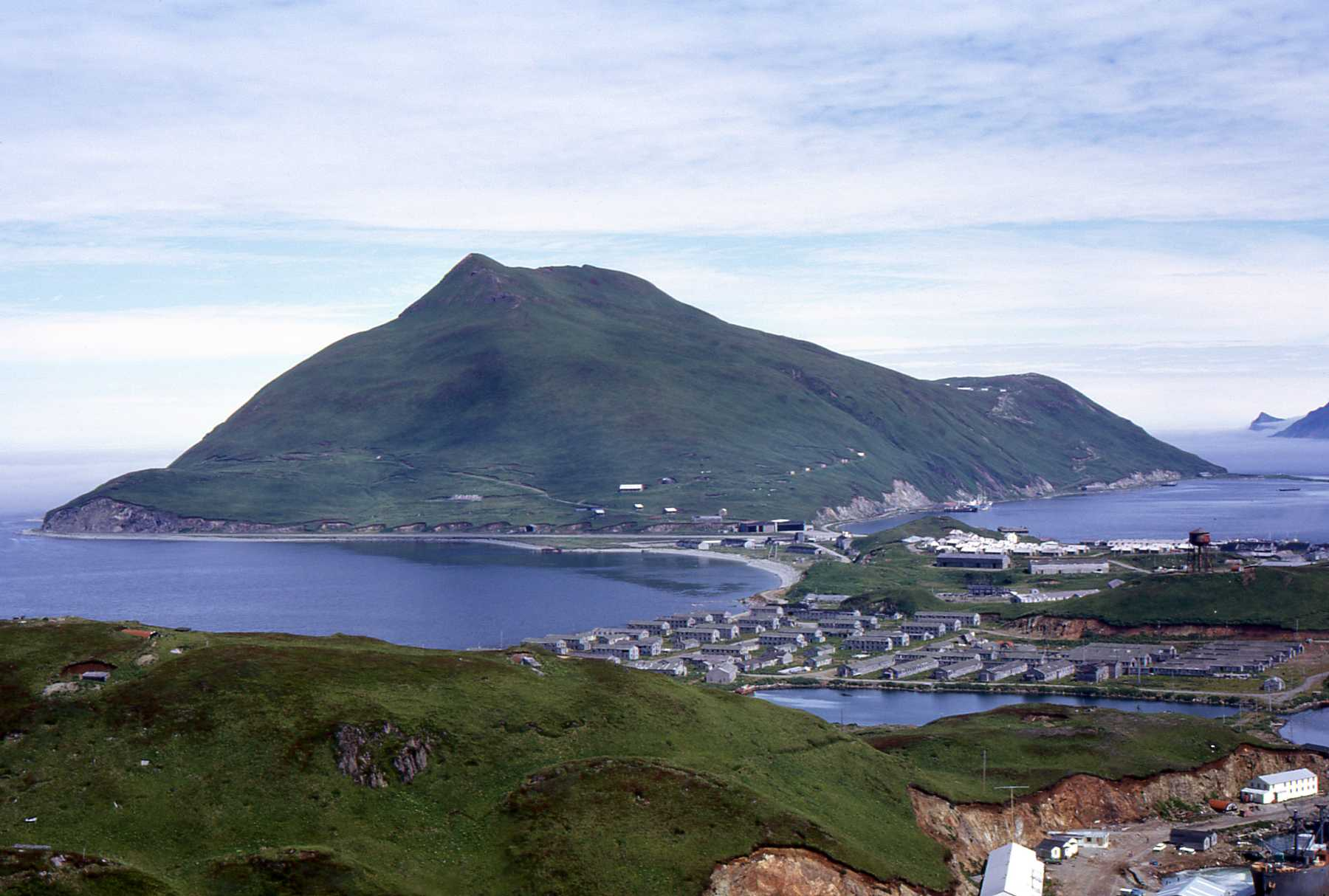
- South aspect

Highest point
- Elevation: 1,650 ft (503 m)
- Prominence: 1,650 ft (503 m)
- Parent peak: Pyramid Peak (2,136 ft)
- Isolation: 2.72 mi (4.38 km)
- Coordinates: 53°54′51″N 166°31′49″W

Naming
- Etymology: Ballyhoo

Geography
- Location within Alaska
- Interactive map of Mount Ballyhoo
- Location: Aleutians West Census Area
- Country: United States
- State: Alaska
- Parent range: Aleutian Range
- Topo map: USGS Unalaska C-2

Geology
- Rock age: Tertiary
- Rock type: Andesitic

Mount Ballyhoo is a 1,650-foot-elevation (503-meter) summit in Alaska, United States.

== Description ==
Mount Ballyhoo is part of the Aleutian Range. This iconic landmark of the Dutch Harbor area is set in Unalaska Bay as the high point of Amaknak Island of the Aleutian Islands. Topographic relief is significant as the summit rises 1,650 feet (503 meters) above tidewater in approximately 0.3 miles (0.48 km). The Aleutian World War II National Historic Area is located on the mountain.

== History ==
The mountain was named by author Jack London when he spent time in 1897 at Dutch Harbor which was the locale for his novel, The Sea-Wolf. Jack stopped here en route to the Klondike Gold Rush and he named the mountain after his lead dog named "Ballyhoo." Jack set foot at the top of the mountain, as did another writer, Rex Beach. The mountain's toponym was published in 1965 by the United States Coast and Geodetic Survey and has been officially adopted by the United States Board on Geographic Names.

During World War II, the Japanese attacked Dutch Harbor on June 3–4, 1942, but American munitions and guns had been moved and placed on Mt. Ballyhoo the night before in anticipation of the raid.

== Climate ==
According to the Köppen climate classification system, Mount Ballyhoo is located in a subpolar oceanic climate zone with cold, snowy winters, and cool summers. Winter temperatures can drop to 0 °F with wind chill factors below −10 °F.

== Gallery ==
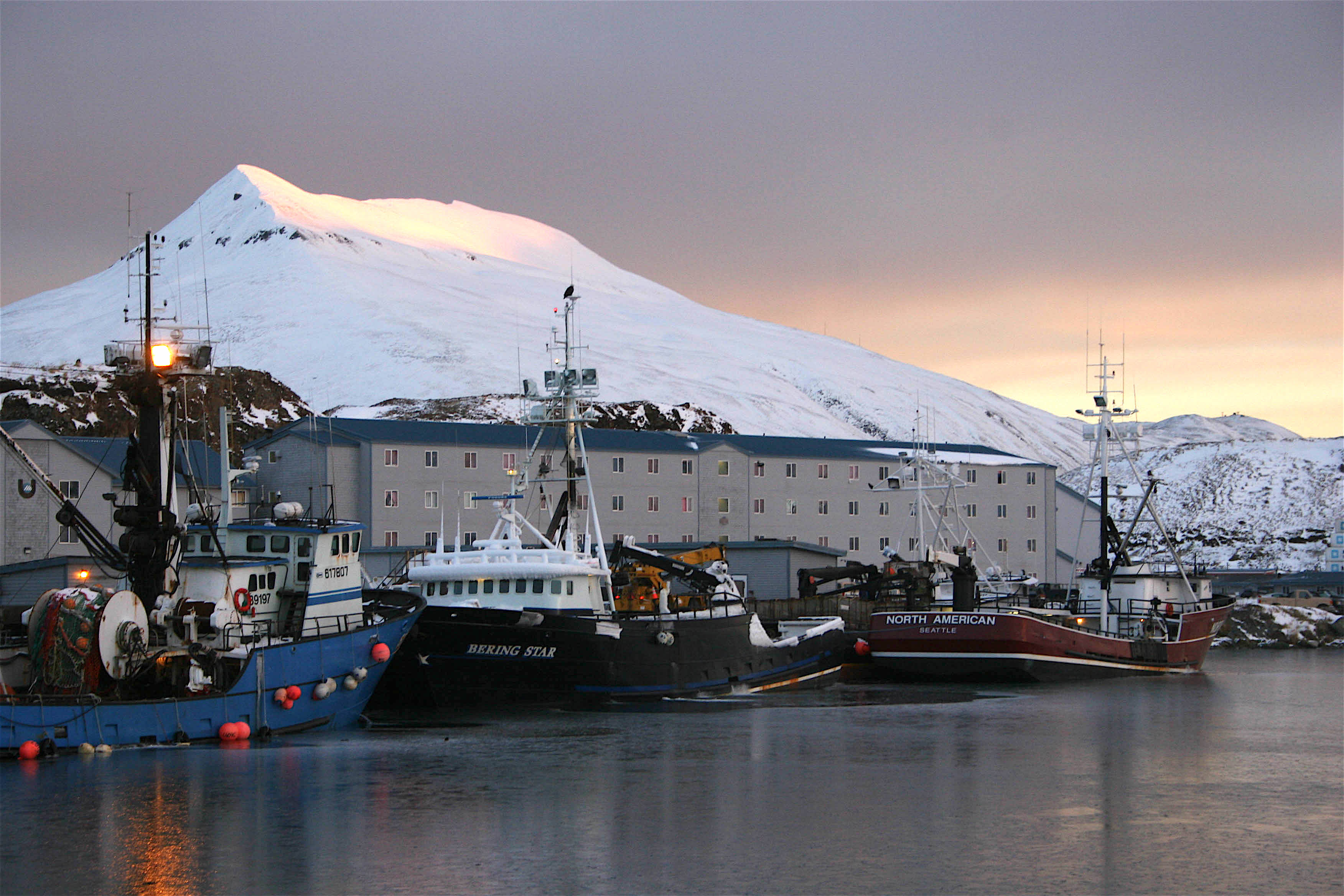
Mt. Ballyhoo from Dutch Harbor

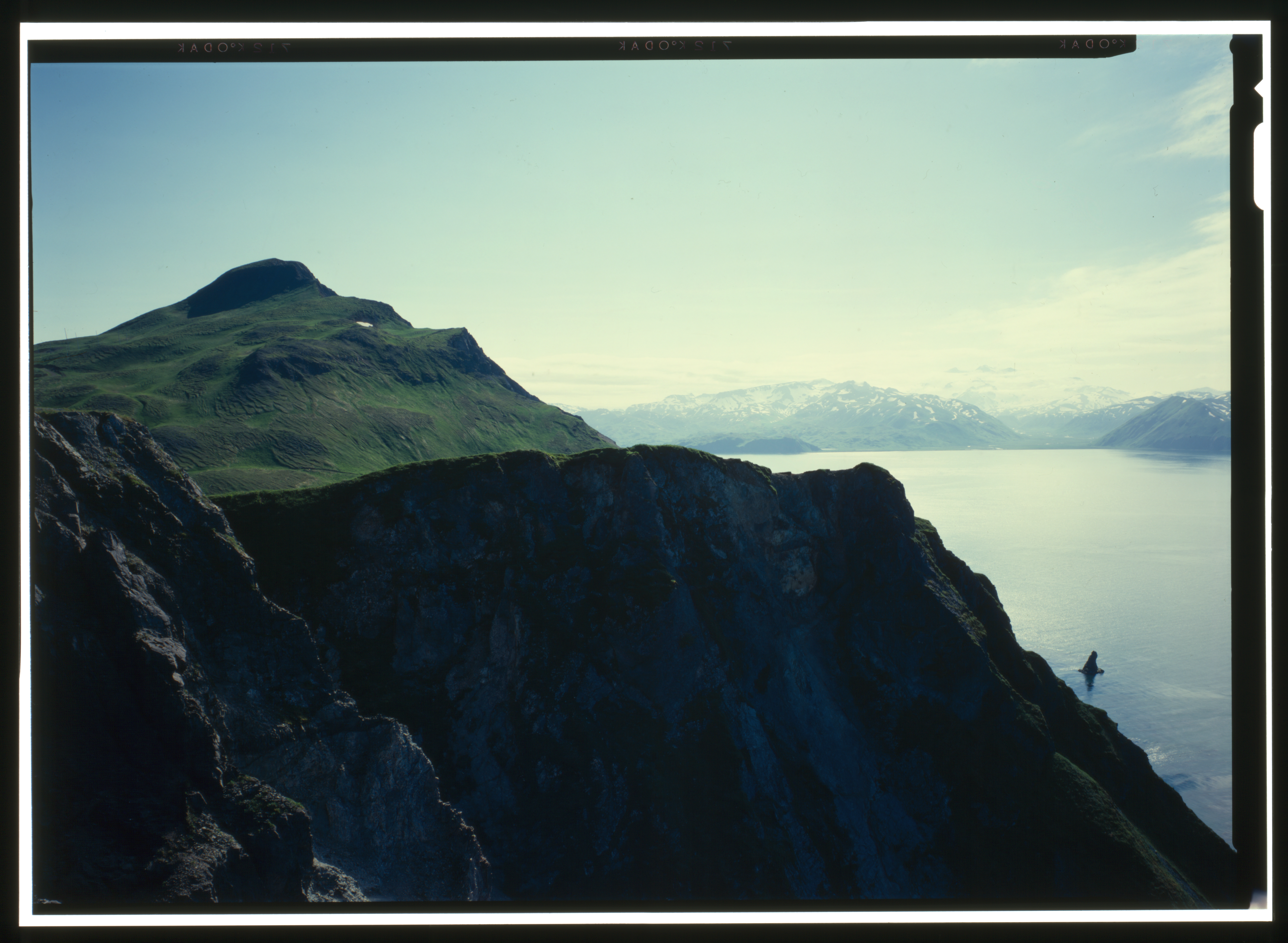

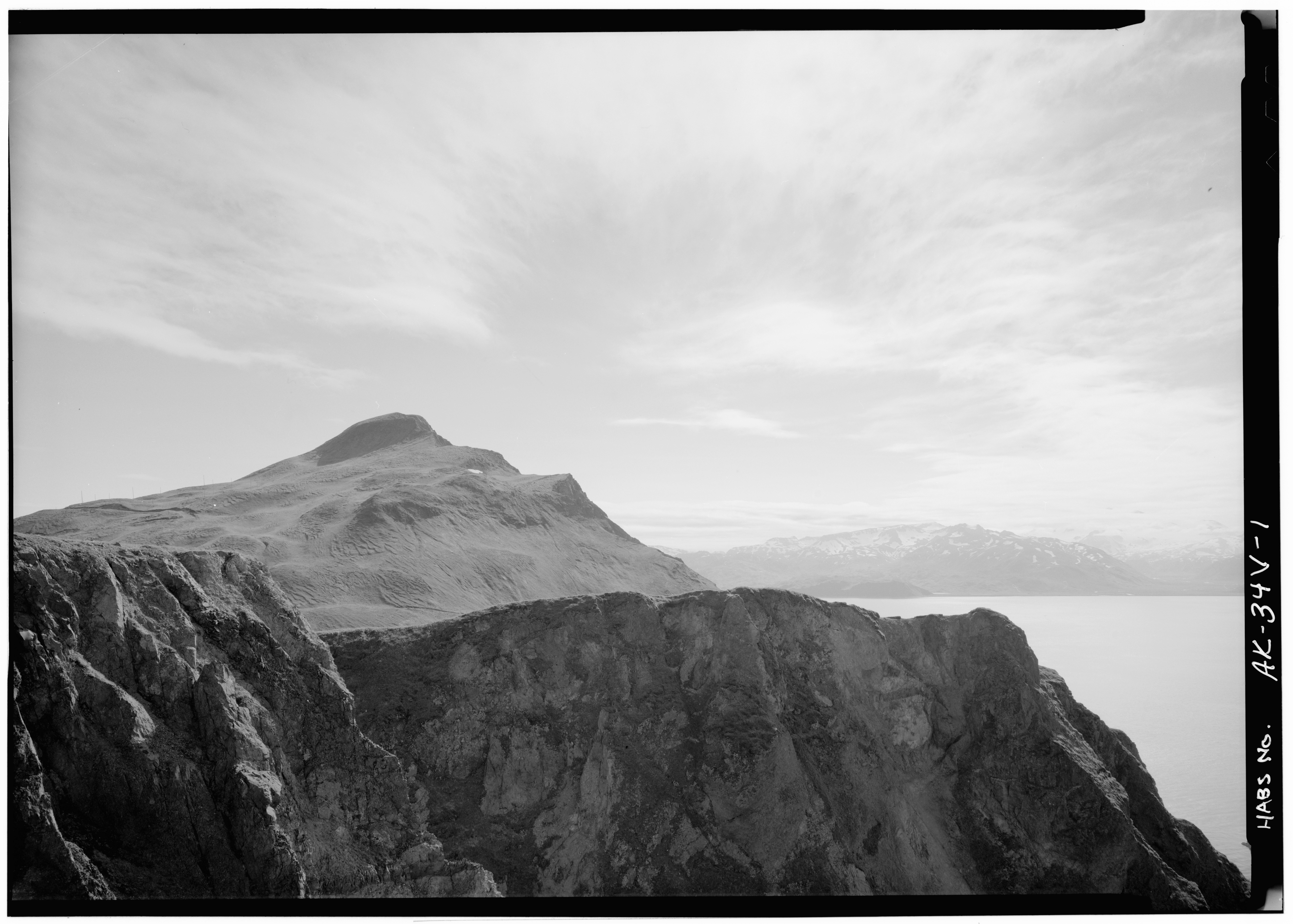

== See also ==
- List of mountain peaks of Alaska
