= Dutch Harbor =

- Harbor
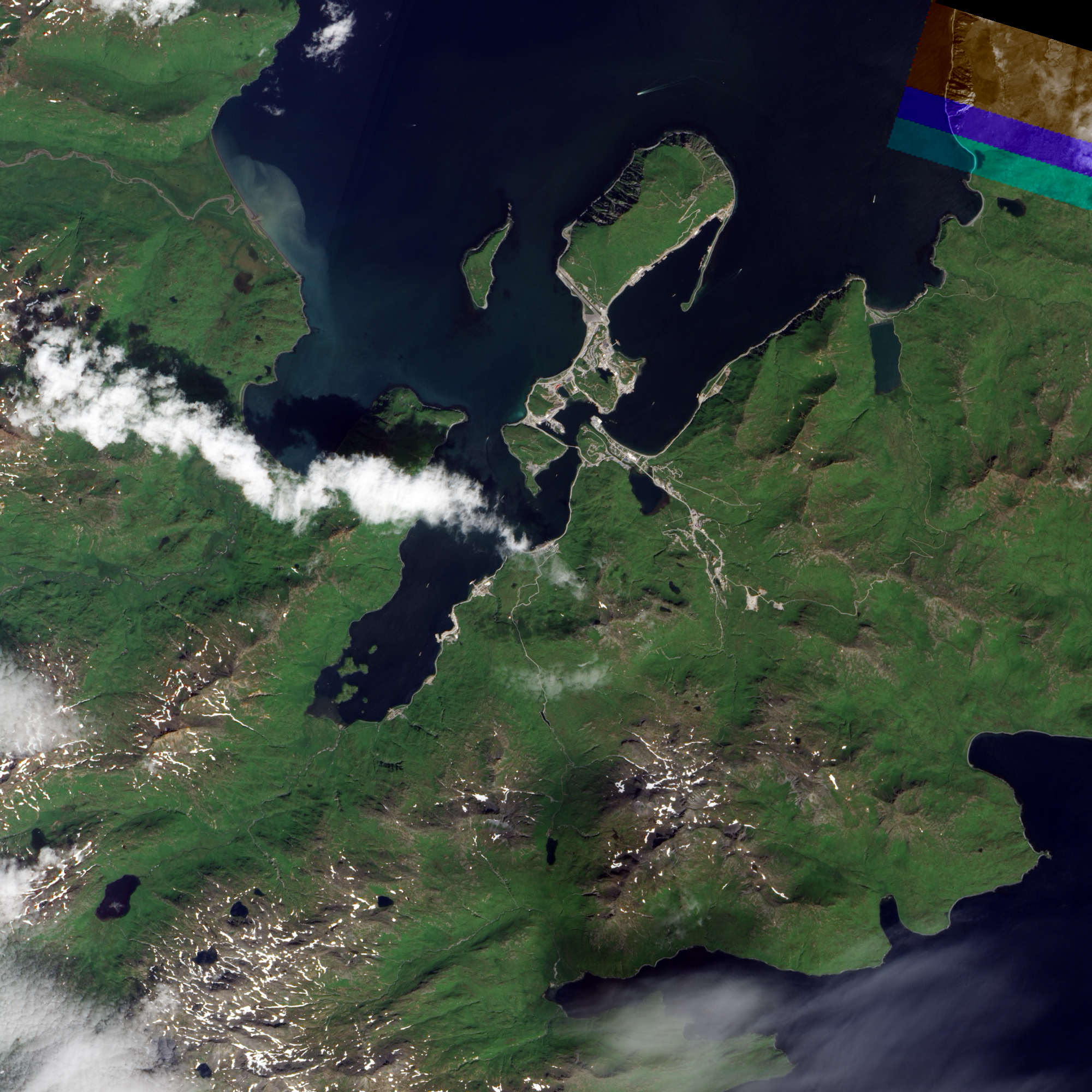
- Natural-color image of Dutch Harbor

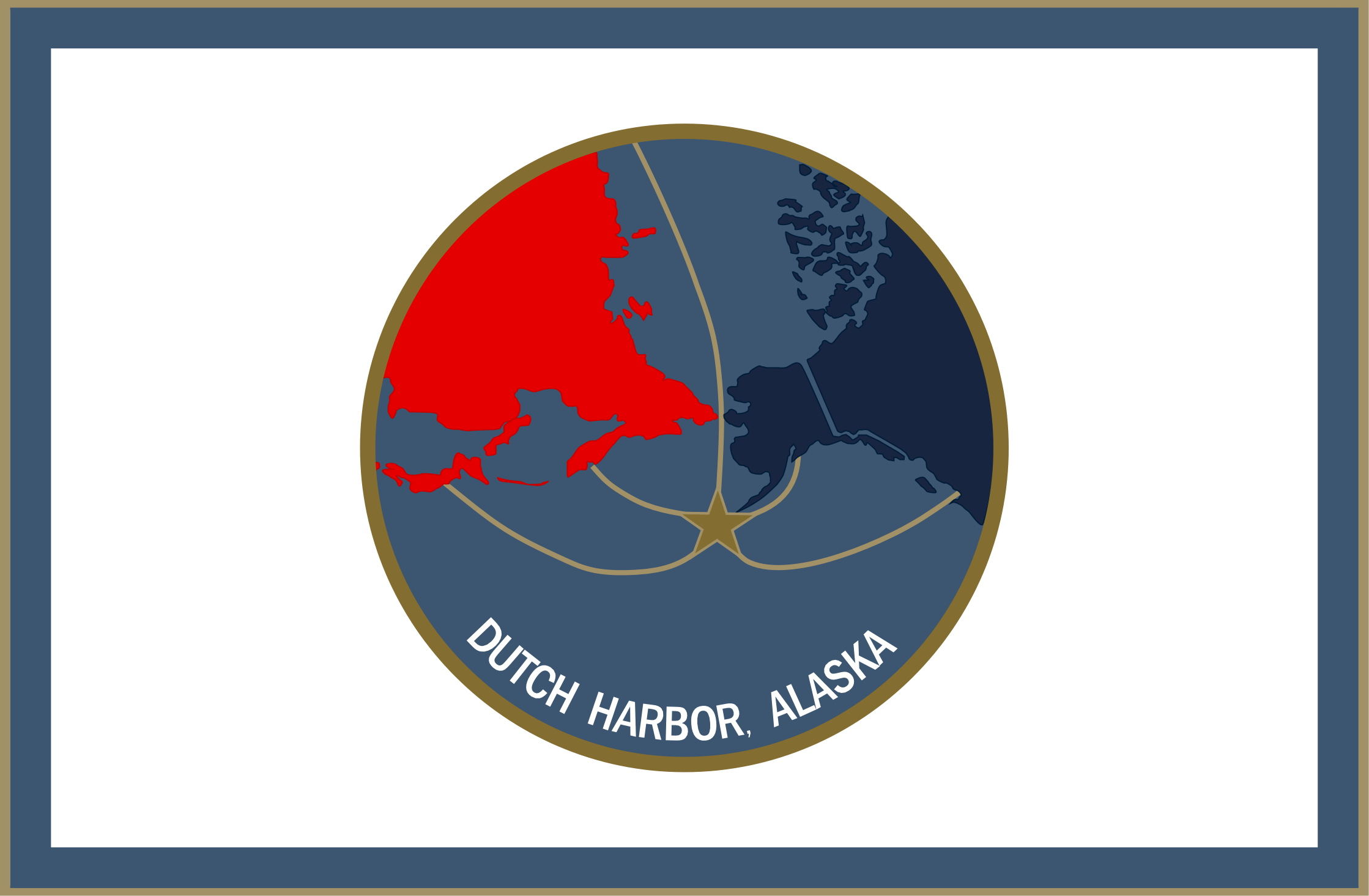
- Flag

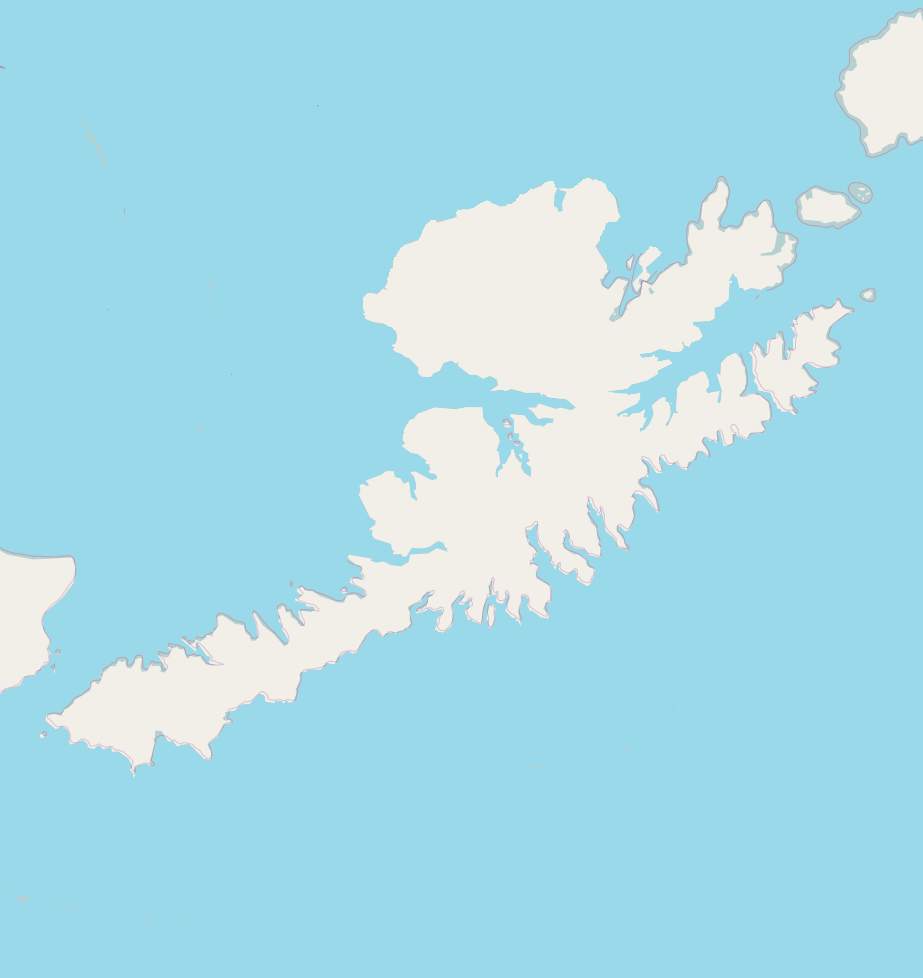
- Location within Unalaska Location within Alaska
- Coordinates: 53°53′40.3″N 166°32′24.3″W
- Country: United States
- State: Alaska
- City: Unalaska

Area
  - Total: 116 sq mi (300 km^{2})

Population (2020)
  - Total: 4,254
  - Density: 36.7/sq mi (14.2/km^{2})
- Time zone: UTC-9 (Alaska (AKST))
  - Summer (DST): UTC-8 (AKDT)
- ZIP code: 99692
- Area code: 907

Dutch Harbor is a harbor on Amaknak Island in Unalaska, Alaska. It was the location of the Battle of Dutch Harbor in June 1942 when the Imperial Japanese Navy attacked it just seven months after the attack on Pearl Harbor in Hawaii. To this day, it remains one of the few sites in the United States to be subjected to an aerial bombardment by a foreign power.

While Dutch Harbor is home of an important fishing industry, fish and mussels have higher PCB levels than fish from non-military areas due to the extensive military contamination.

== Geography ==
Dutch Harbor is located within the Aleutian Islands of Alaska, more precisely on Amaknak Island in the Fox Islands. A mile-long spit extending from the northeast end of Amaknak Island makes Dutch Harbor a natural port, protecting ships from the waves and currents of the Bering Sea, although winds off the Bering Sea have tossed shipments from decks of ships. Dutch Harbor is close to some of the richest fishing in the world, and it is ice-free.

== History ==
The native people are known as Aleut. When the Russians arrived, they exploited the Aleut by taxing them in fur pelts. Druzhinin, commander of the Russian ship Zakharii I Elisaveta, is credited with discovering the deep-water harbor now known as Dutch Harbor.

The Russian-American Company operated from 1799 through the mid-1800s. It used Dutch Harbor in the transport of goods, mainly seal and sea otter fur. In 1867, Russia sold Alaska to the United States. Fur was the main export in Alaska after the United States took control. Hutchinson, Kohl, & Company of San Francisco took over the assets of the Russian America Company in 1867, but it sold out in 1868, to the Alaska Commercial Company. A decline in the sea otter population slowed trade in 1895.

The year 1897 brought a crowd of potential prospectors looking to get rich from the Alaska Gold Rush.

=== World War II ===
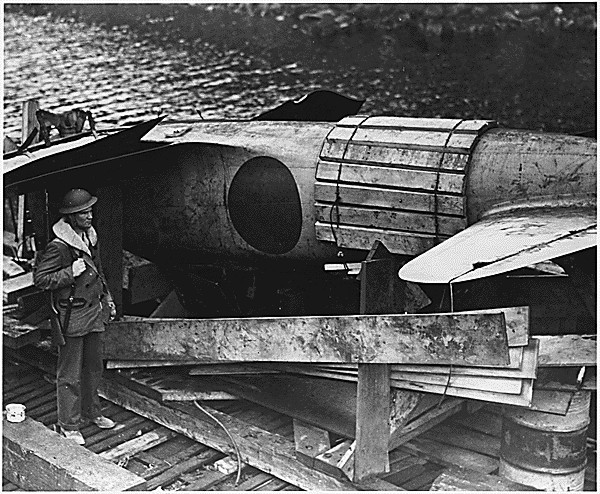
A Japanese Zero that crashed at Dutch Harbor, being recovered

World War II brought the U.S. Army and Navy, and their supplies, to Dutch Harbor at the Dutch Harbor Naval Operating Base and Fort Mears, U.S. Army. The first army troops arrived in June 1941 and the navy air base was finished in September 1941. During the war, Dutch Harbor was also used to house refugees evacuated from other Aleutian Islands.

U.S. Army troops and civilian workers alike spent time at "Blackies", the only bar in the area. This establishment had cheap beer and 50-cent shots of whiskey, but no stools or chairs as they "splintered too easily in the event of a fight". Other entertainment included a brothel named "Pleasure Island", but this was closed in 1941 and later replaced by part of the U.S. Navy submarine base. The 500-man mess hall doubled as a theater. The tickets for the military were 15 cents and 35 cents for civilian workers.

In early 1942, intelligence officers of the U.S. Navy predicted that there would be a Japanese attack in the North Pacific area, and naval codebreakers warned Dutch Harbor of the impending attack. On June 3, 1942, at 5:45 a.m., 20 Japanese planes from two aircraft carriers of the Imperial Japanese Navy bombed Dutch Harbor in the "Battle of Dutch Harbor," targeting the radio station and the petroleum storage tanks, and continuing the fight a day later.

By mid-1942, a small submarine base was in place, with a squadron of old U.S. Navy S-class submarines; these were withdrawn by late 1943 due to the availability of longer-range submarines (such as the Gato class) operating elsewhere.

By May 1943, a peak of 10,151 sailors and 9,976 soldiers were stationed at the base.

=== Post-World War II ===
In 1947, the last units of the U.S. Navy left Dutch Harbor, and the base was decommissioned.

In 1952, the U.S. Army Corps of Engineers stored 232 surplus buildings on 448 acres of land of the Fort Mears Military Reservation.

The area was turned over for commercial use and the U.S. Navy also scrapped its air base on Dutch Harbor. The ship Kuroshima wrecked in 1997 when it broke away from its anchorage in the Dutch Harbor area.

During the mid-1980s, the U.S. government finally funded the cleanup of the derelict fort. As of 2026, the clean up has not been completed, and contamination in soil and subsistence food has been demonstrated.

== Current events ==
The harbor is prominently featured in the Discovery Channel reality television series Deadliest Catch, which has originated there since 2005.

== Demographics ==
Historical population
Census	Pop.	Note	%±
1930	17		—
1940	52		205.9%
U.S. Decennial Census

Dutch Harbor first appeared on the 1930 U.S. Census as an unincorporated village. It returned lastly in 1940 and did not appear again separately afterward. It was later annexed into Unalaska.

== Fishing ==
Dutch Harbor is ranked as a top fishing port with more than a billion dollars transferred each year. Huge harvests of pollock and cod in the Bering Sea are part of this total. The Bering Sea has a continental shelf that is one of the world's largest, and supports a rich ecosystem.

However, fish and mussels from Dutch Harbor has higher PCB levels than fish from non-military areas.

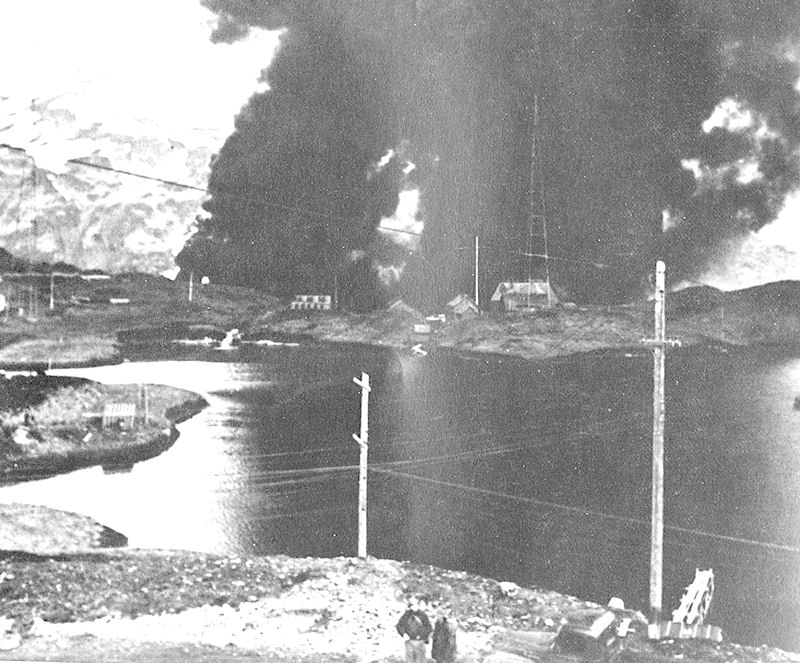
Dutch Harbor attacked in WW2 - June 1942

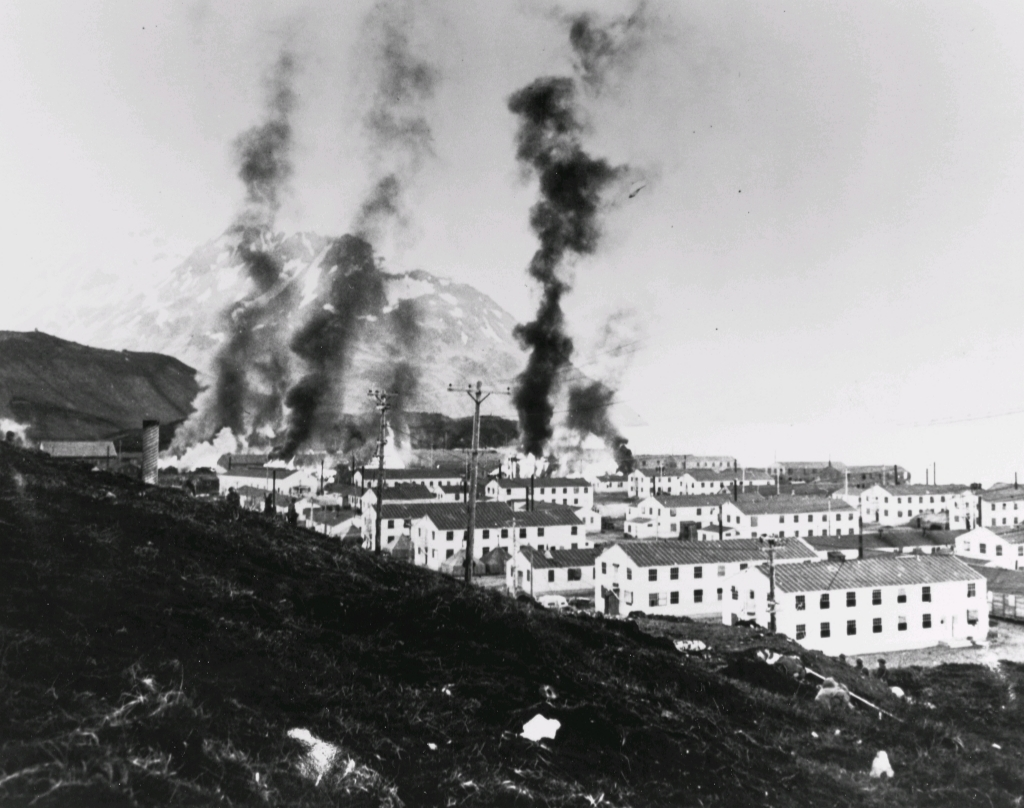
Buildings burning after the first Japanese attack, 3 June 1942.

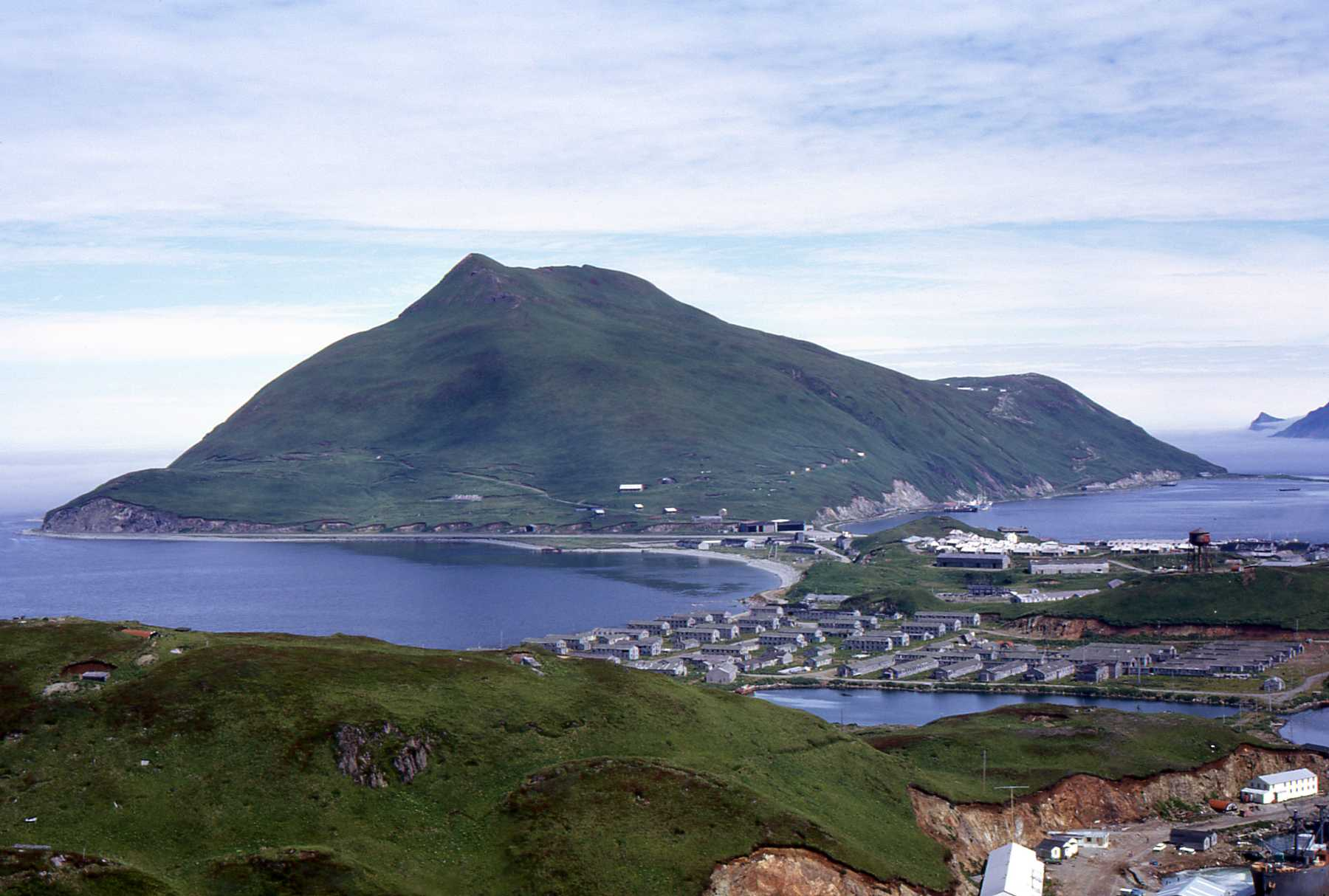
The Naval Operating Base in 1972
Mount Ballyhoo centered

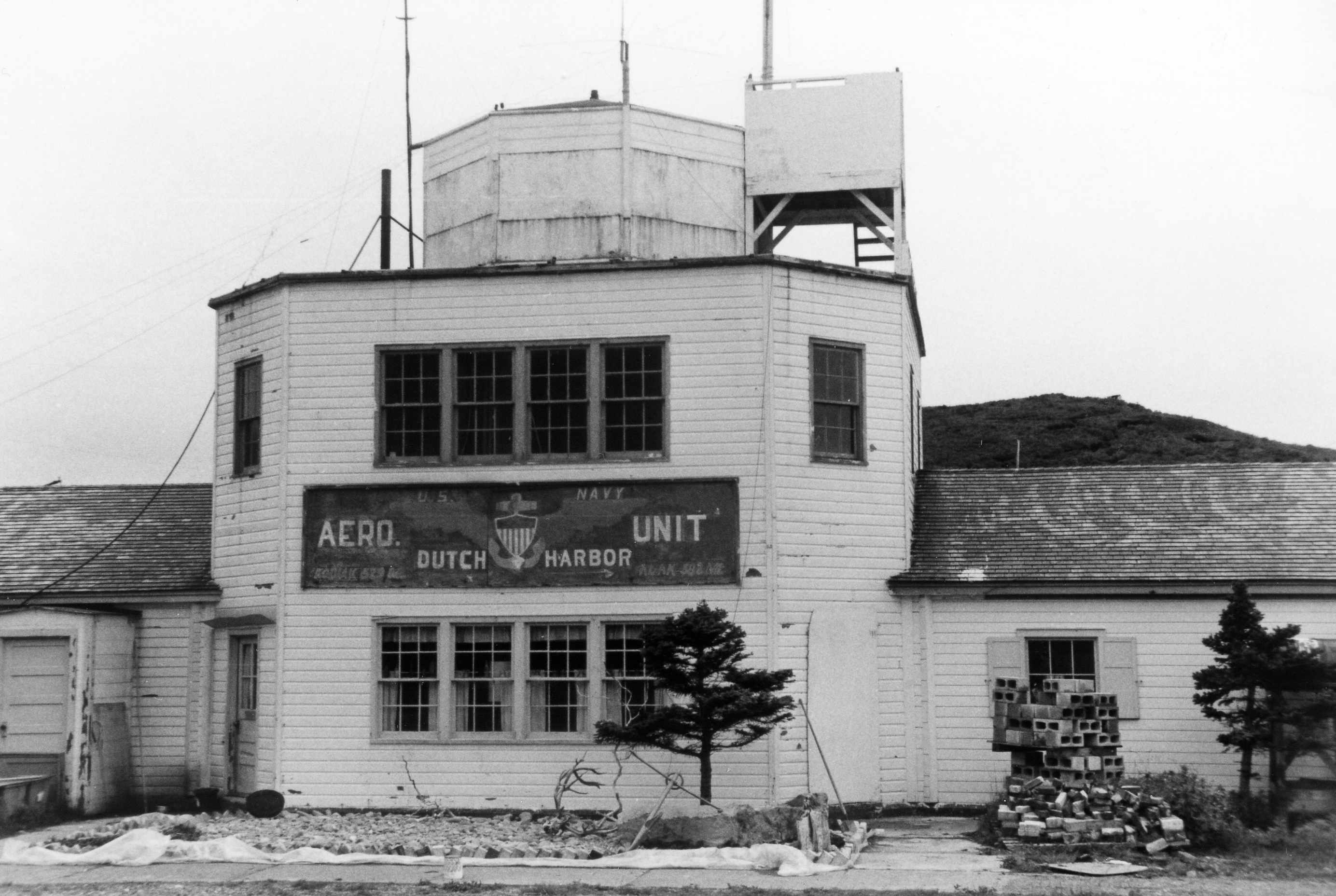
The building at Dutch Harbor airport was used as a communication room and terminal with the old U.S. Navy Aero Unit insignia in August 1972

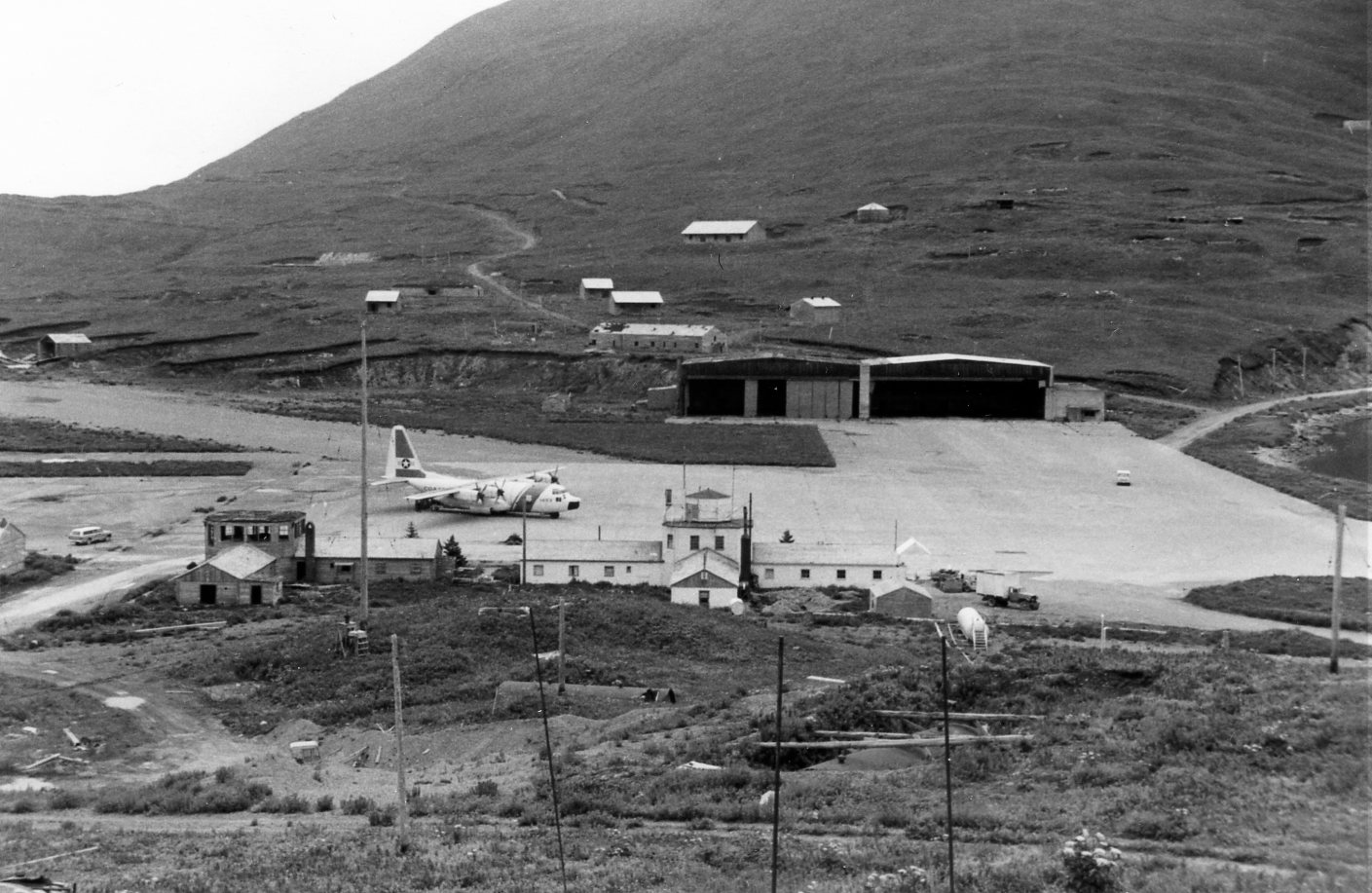
View of Dutch Harbor ramp area with a USCG C-130 Hercules on stand-by for an emergency flight.

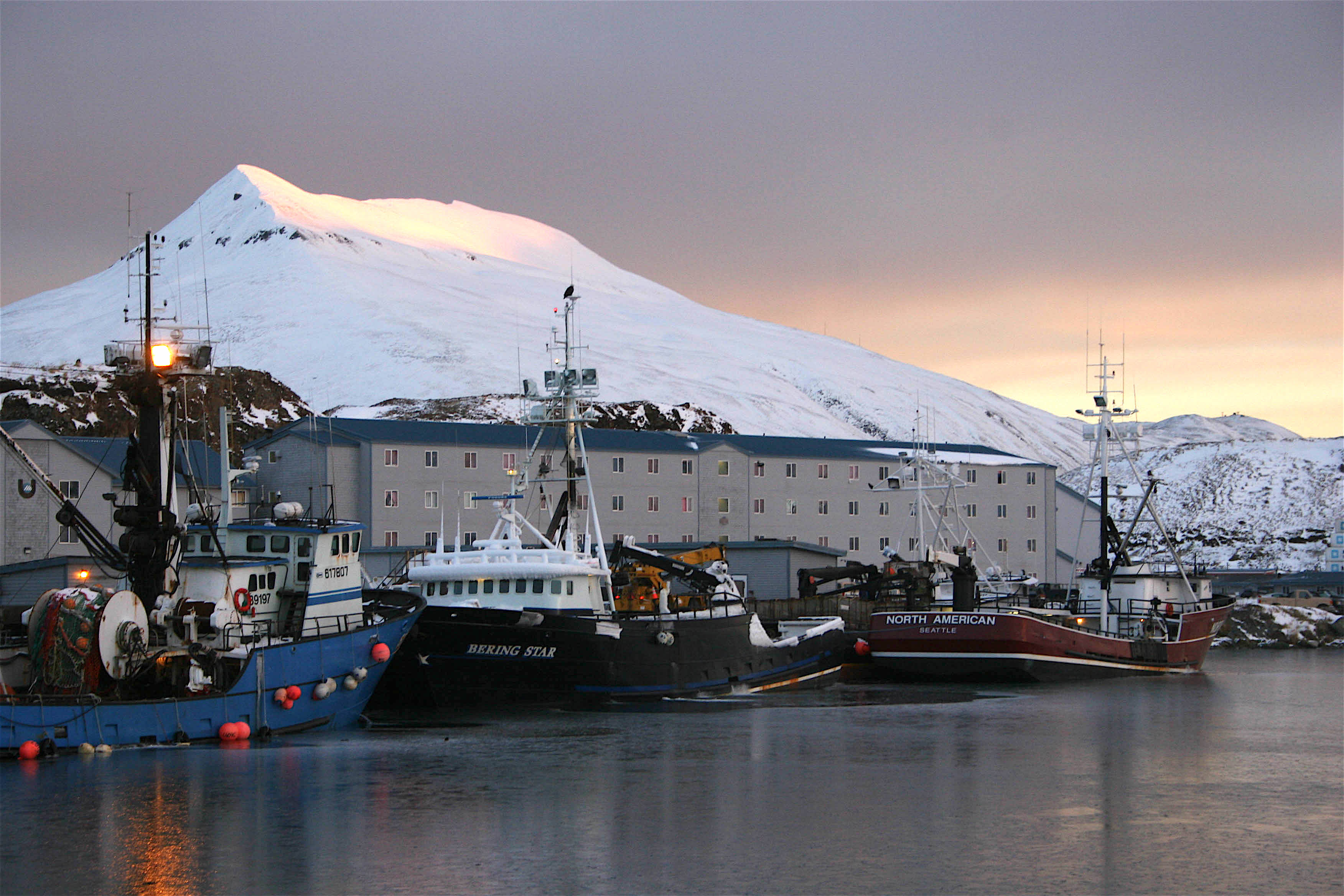
Crab boats docked at Dutch Harbor in January 2009.
