= Unalaska, Alaska =

Town in Alaska

Unalaska Iluulux̂ (Aleut) Уналашка (Russian)
- City
- City of Unalaska
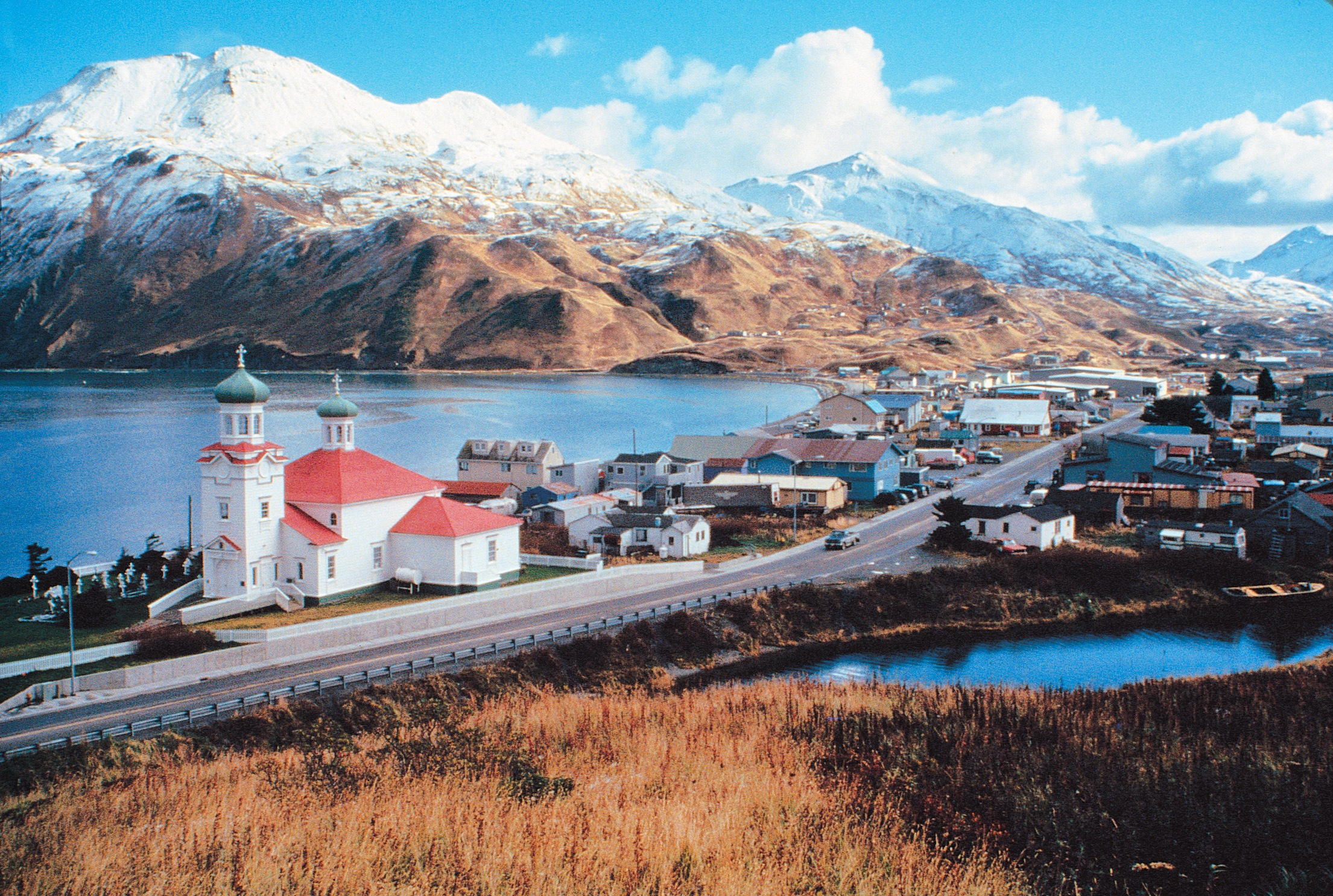
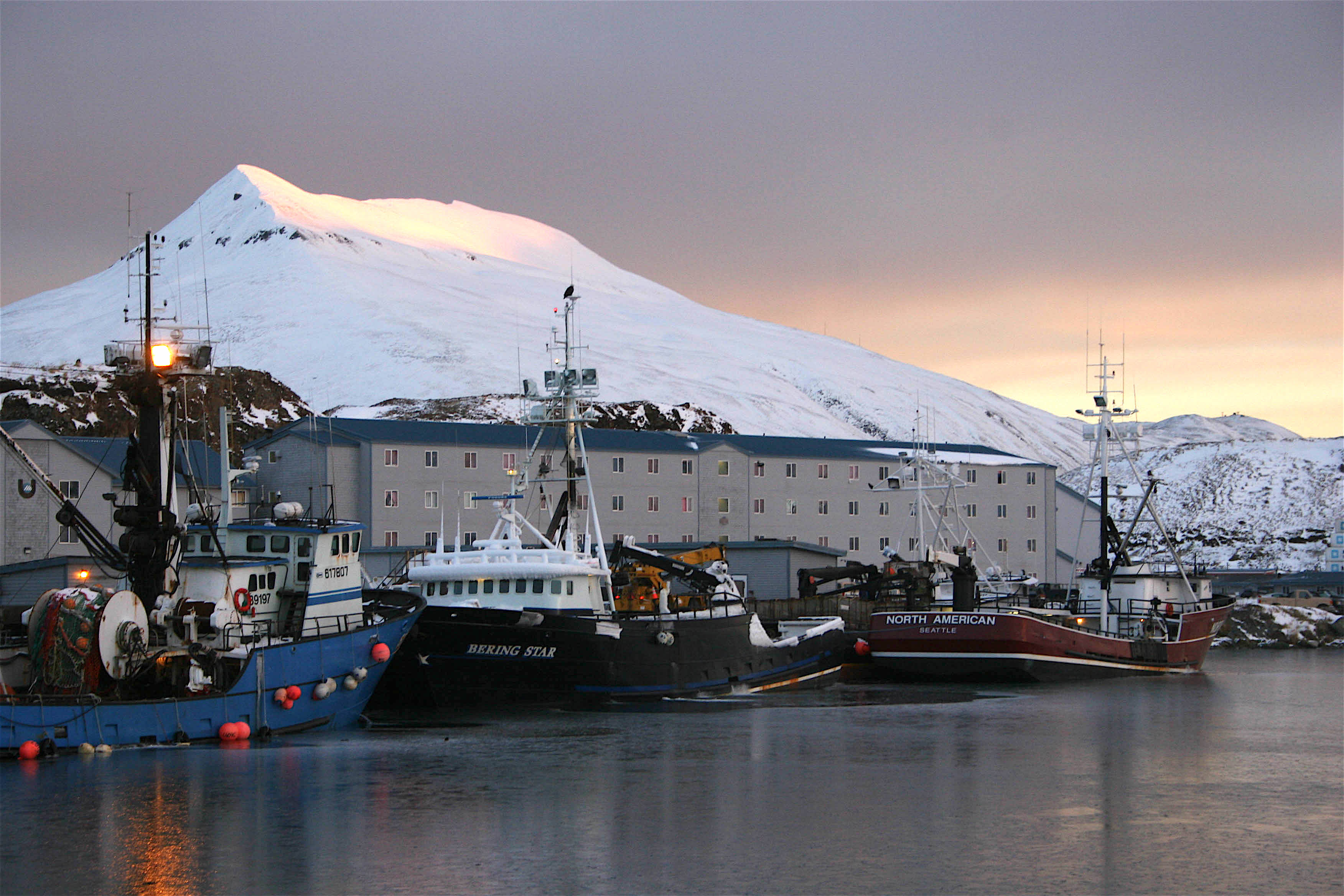
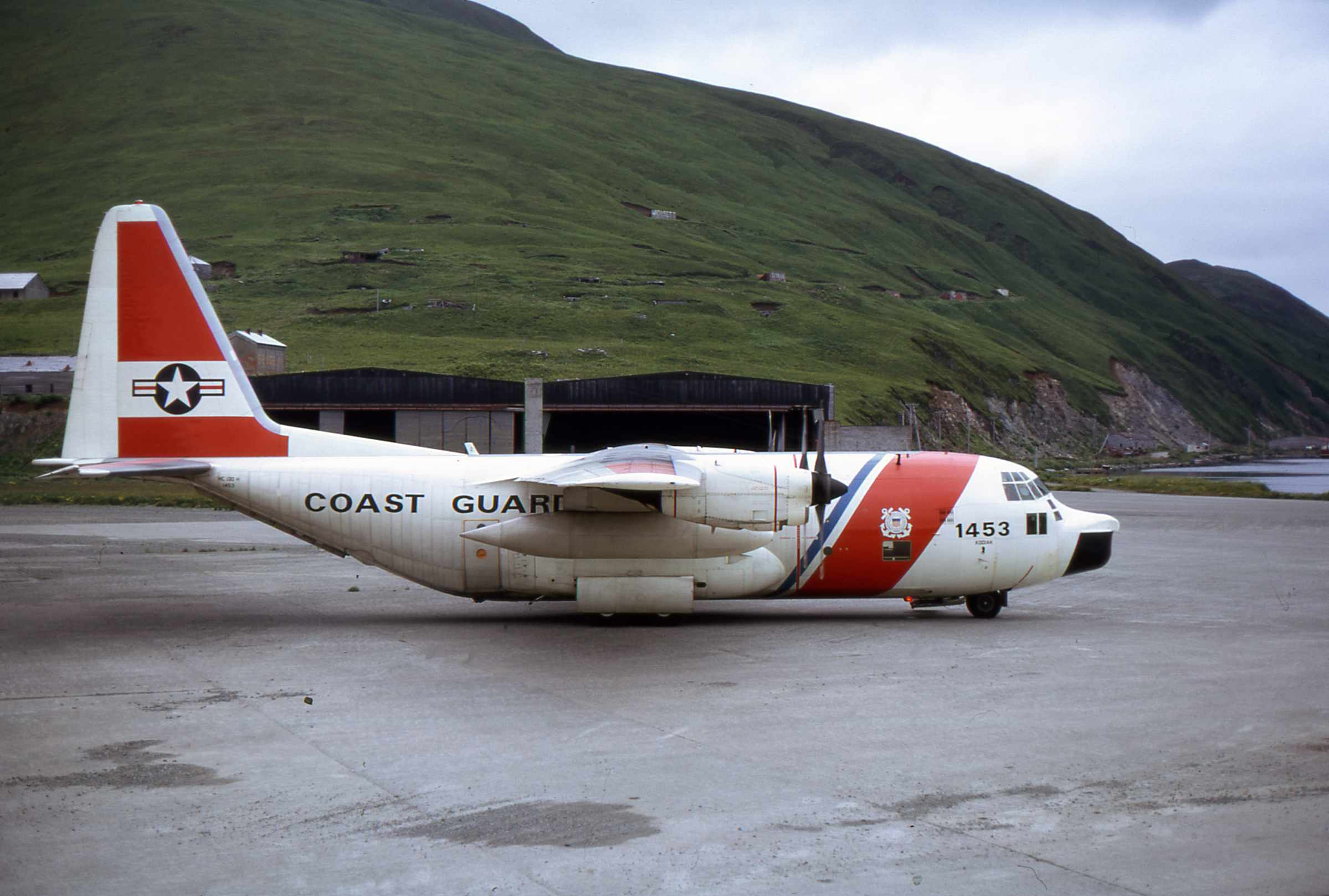
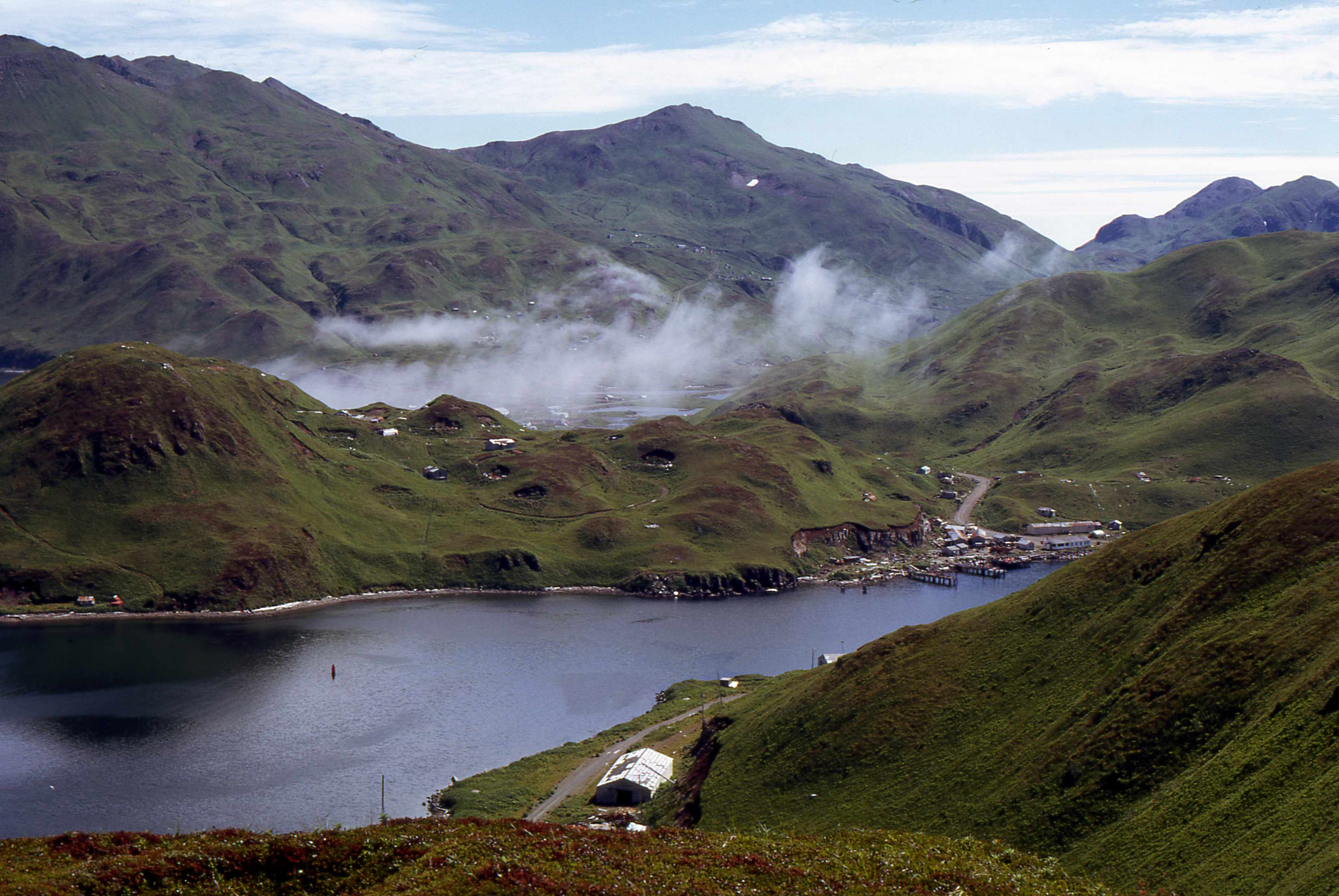
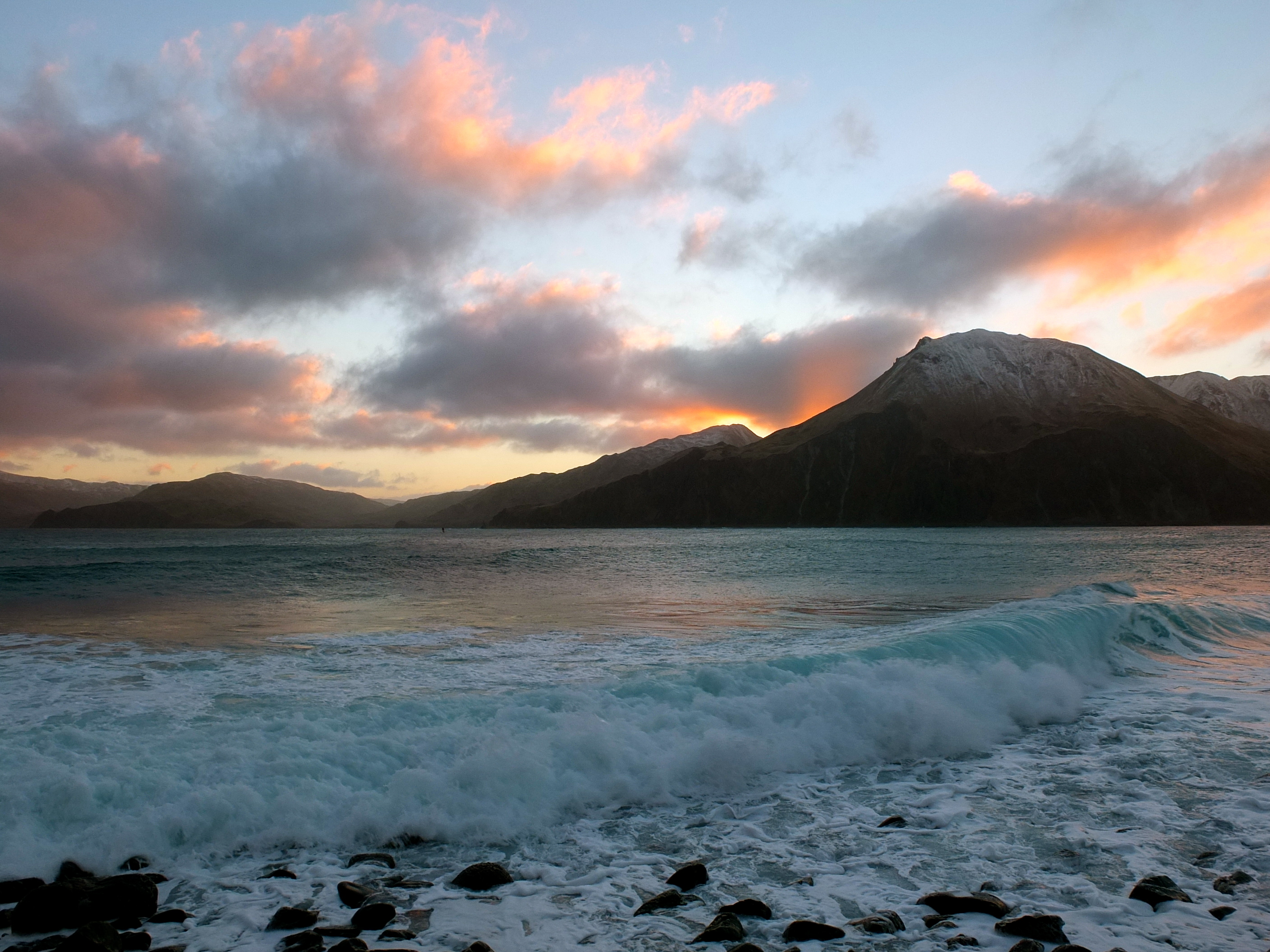
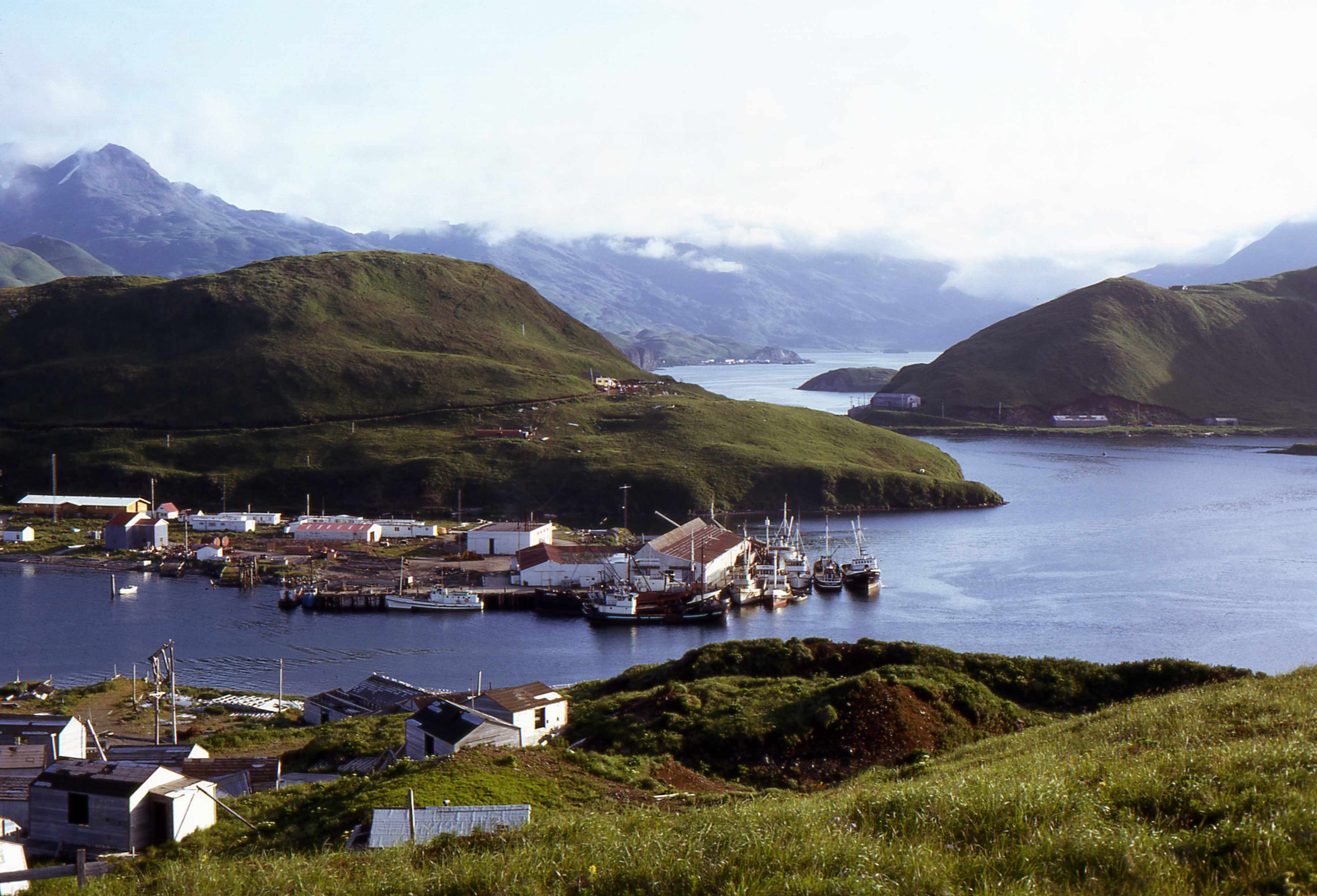
- Hilltop view of Unalaska Crab boats moored in Dutch Harbor in 2009 U.S.C.G. C-130 Hercules at Dutch Harbor Airport View from a hill on Amaknak Island View from the shore at sunrise Unalaska Island and Iliukliuk Harbor

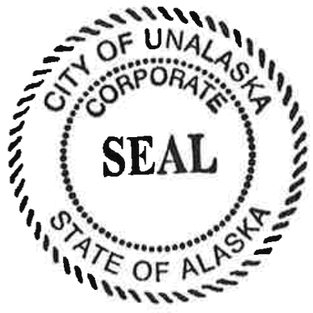
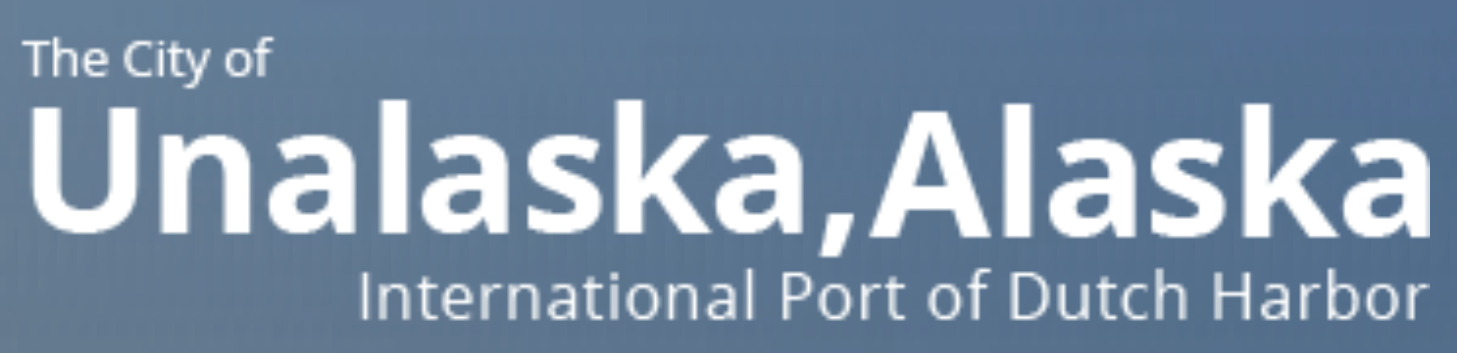
- Seal Logo
- Interactive map of Unalaska
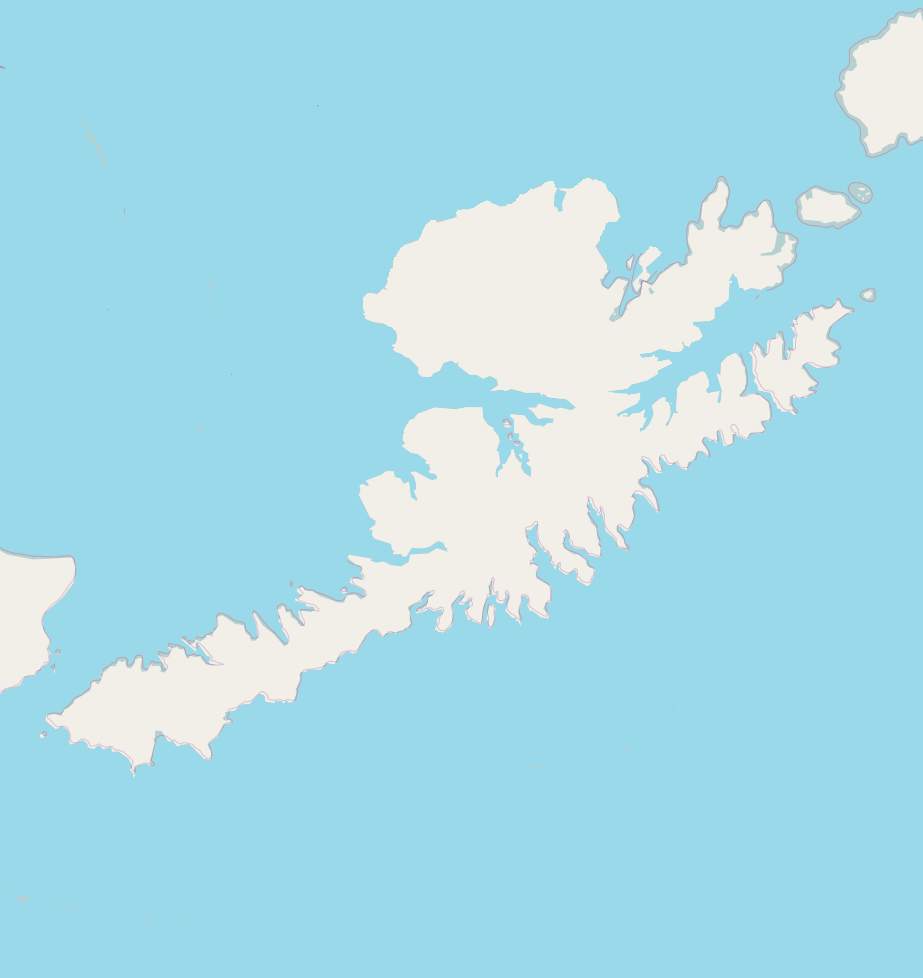
- Location within Unalaska Location within Alaska
- Coordinates: 53°53′20″N 166°31′38″W
- Country: United States
- State: Alaska
- Census Area: Aleutians West
- Incorporated: March 3, 1942

Government
  - Mayor: Vince Tutiakoff
  - State senator: Lyman Hoffman (D)
  - State rep.: Bryce Edgmon (I)

Area
  - Total: 210.89 sq mi (546.20 km^{2})
  - Land: 102.21 sq mi (264.73 km^{2})
  - Water: 108.68 sq mi (281.47 km^{2})
- Elevation: 13 ft (4 m)

Population (2020)
  - Total: 4,254
  - Density: 41.6/sq mi (16.07/km^{2})
- Demonym: Unalaskan
- Time zone: UTC-09:00 (AKST)
  - Summer (DST): UTC-08:00 (AKDT)
- ZIP code: 99685
- Area code: 907
- FIPS code: 02-80770
- GNIS feature ID: 1419424
- Website: www.ci.unalaska.ak.us

The City of Unalaska (Aleut: Iluulux̂; Russian: Уналашка) is the main population center in the Aleutian Islands. The city is in the Aleutians West Census Area, a regional component of the Unorganized Borough in the U.S. state of Alaska. Unalaska is located on Unalaska Island and neighboring Amaknak Island in the Aleutian Islands off mainland Alaska. The population was 4,254 at the 2020 census, which is 81% of the entire Aleutians West Census Area. Unalaska is the second-largest city in the Unorganized Borough, behind Bethel.

The Aleut (Unangan) people have lived on Unalaska Island for thousands of years. The Unangan, who were the first to inhabit the island of Unalaska, named it "Ounalashka", meaning "near the peninsula". The regional native corporation has adopted this moniker, and is known as the Ounalashka Corporation. The Russian fur trade reached Unalaska when Stepan Glotov and his crew arrived on August 1, 1759. Natives, Russians and their Alaskan Creole descendants composed most of the community's population until the mid-20th century, when the involvement of the United States in World War II led to a large-scale influx of people and construction of buildings all along the strategically located Aleutians.

Almost all of the community's port facilities are on Amaknak Island, better known as Dutch Harbor or just "Dutch". It is the largest fisheries port in the U.S. by volume caught. It includes Dutch Harbor Naval Operating Base and Fort Mears, U.S. Army, a U.S. National Historic Landmark. Dutch Harbor lies within the city limits of Unalaska and is connected to Unalaska by a bridge. Amaknak Island is home to almost 59 percent of the city's population, although it has less than 3 percent of its land area.

As a result of the town's strong fishing industry, Unalaska has also become notable for its large population of bald eagles, which number in the hundreds and were attracted to the area by human activity.

== History ==
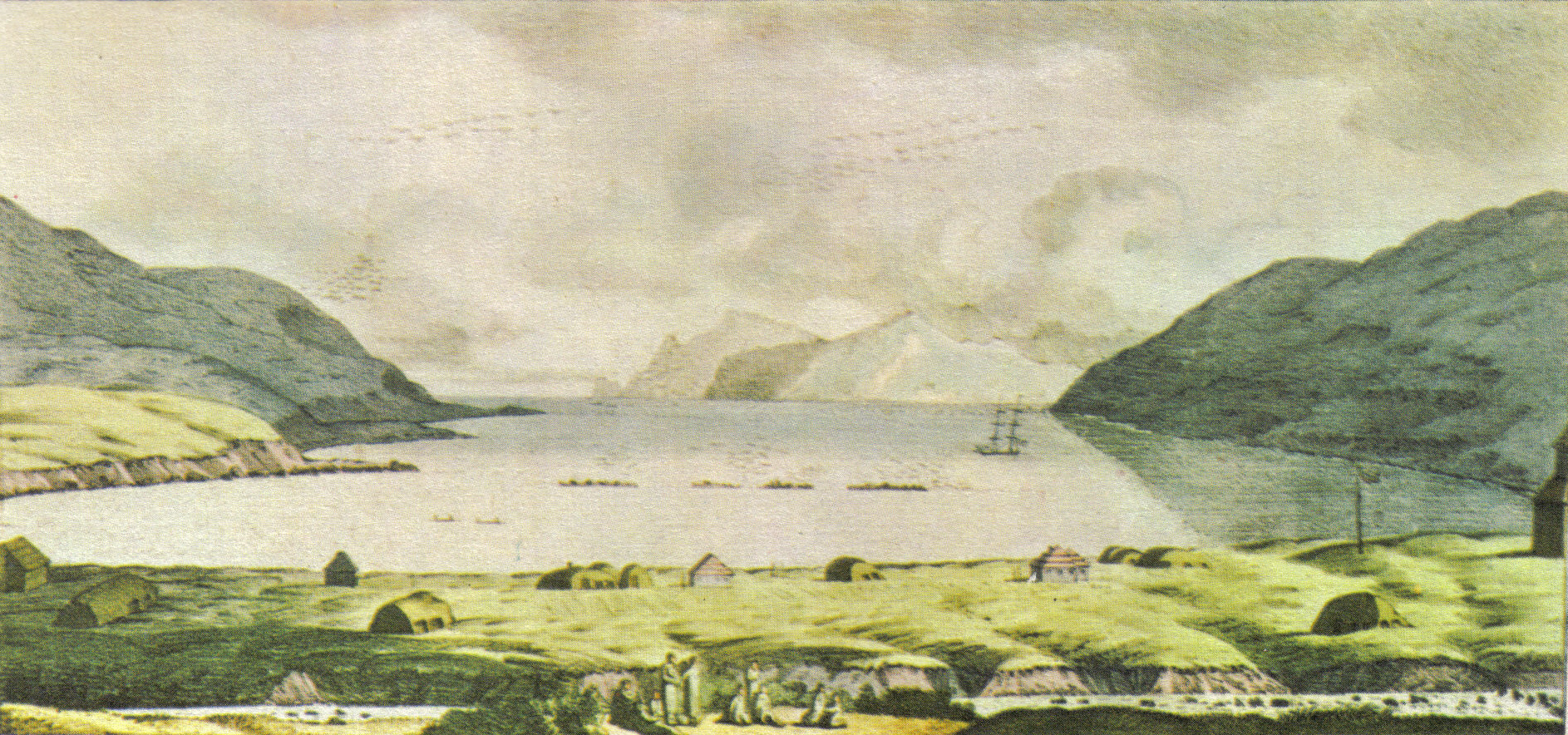
The port of Unalaska in 1816.

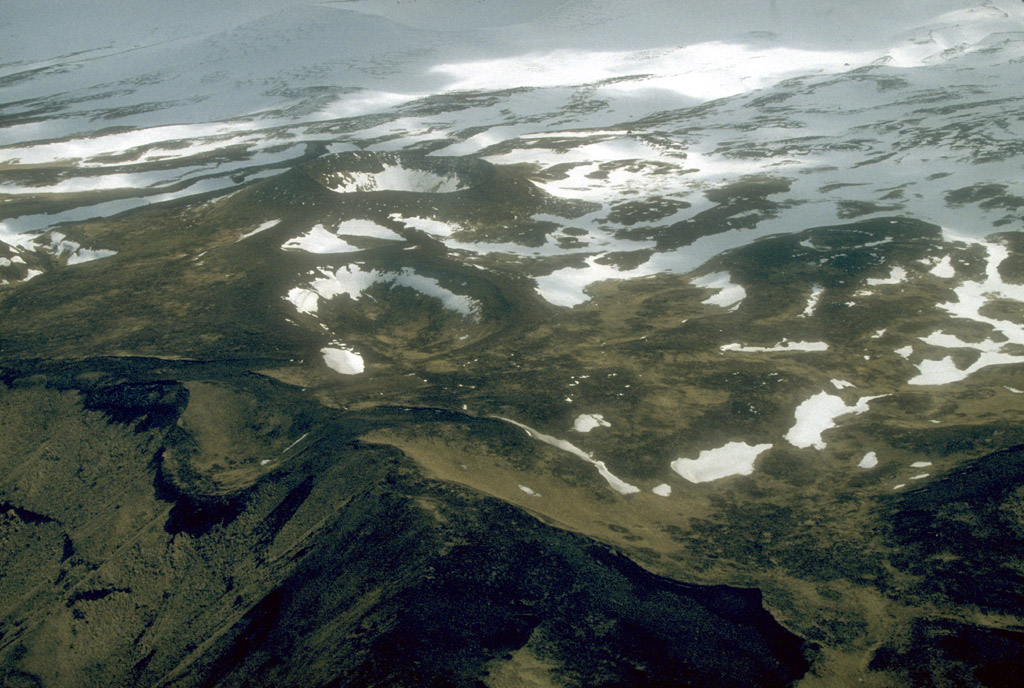
Aerial view of the Point Kadin vents, a series of post-glacial explosion pits and small cinder cones that occur along a fracture zone northwest of the summit of Makushin Volcano.

The island of Unalaska was first inhabited by the Aleut people.

Unalaska and Amaknak islands contained 24 settlements with more than 1,000 Aleut inhabitants in 1759, when the first Russian group under Stepan Glotov came and started trading for three years on Umnak and Unalaska. Between 1763 and 1766, a conflict between the Russian fur traders and the Unalaska Natives occurred; the Aleuts destroyed four Russian ships and killed 175 hunters/traders. In the 1760s, Unalaska was temporarily used as a Russian fur trading post. The post was permanently established in 1774, and was eventually incorporated into the Russian-American Company. It was there that Captain James Cook encountered the navigator Gerasim Izmailov in 1778.

In 1788, the Spanish made contact with the Russians in Alaska for the first time. An expedition by Esteban José Martínez and Gonzalo López de Haro visited several Russian settlements. Their westernmost visit was to Unalaska. On August 5, 1788, they claimed Unalaska for Spain, calling it Puerto de Dona Marie Luisa Teresa.

Alexander Andreyevich Baranov was shipwrecked here in 1790.

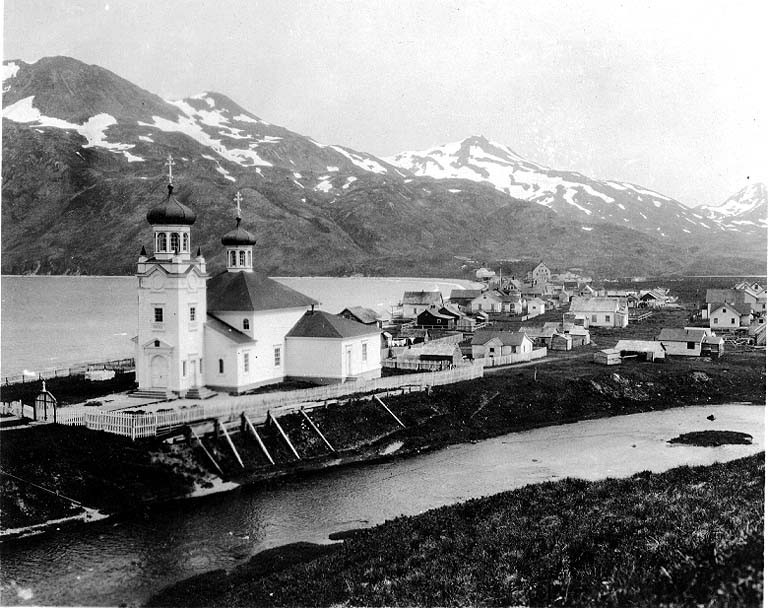
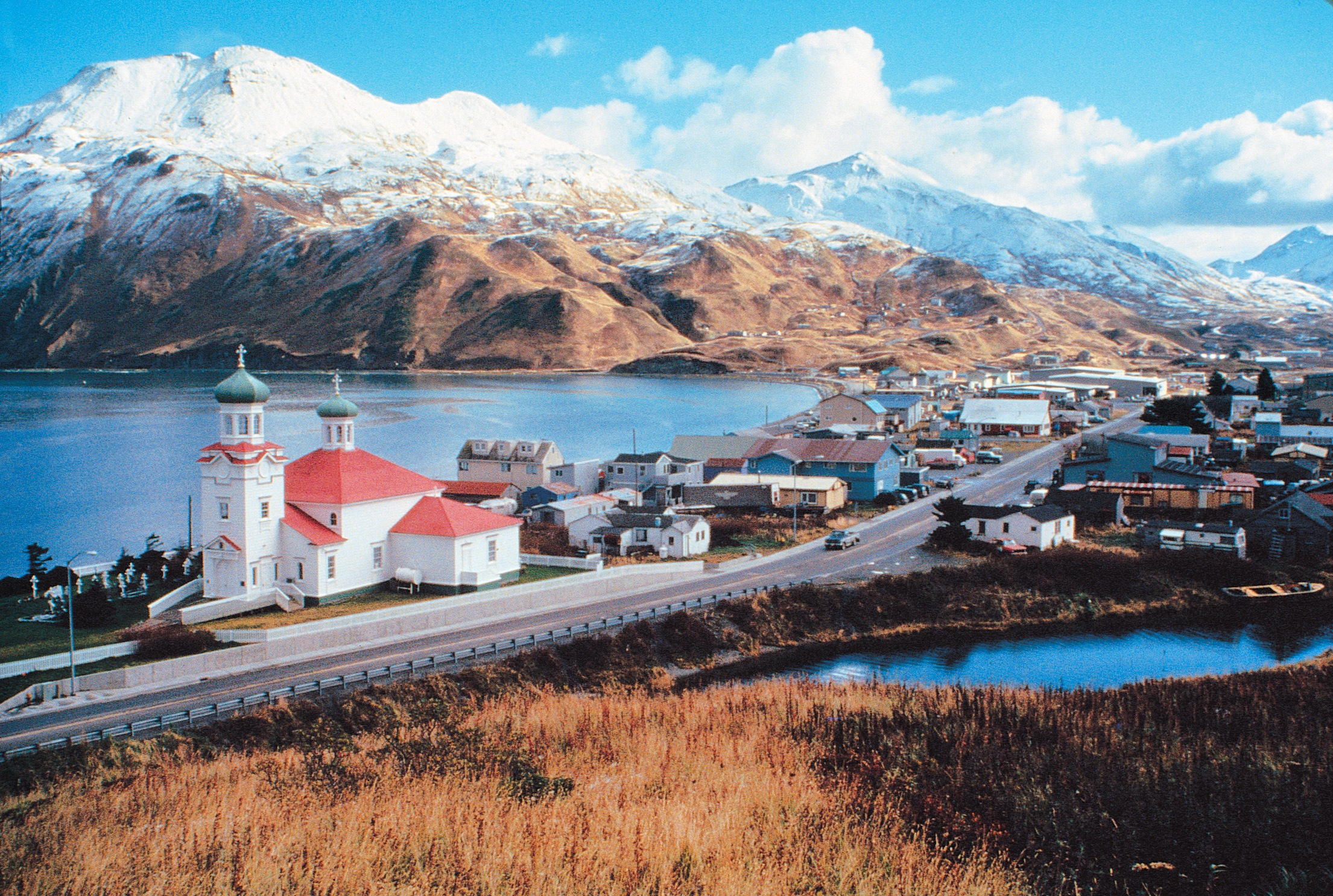
A comparison of the town in 1906 and 2006

In 1825, the Russian Orthodox Church of the Holy Ascension was built in Unalaska. The founding priest, Ivan Veniaminov, later canonized as Saint Innocent of Alaska, composed the first Aleut writing system with local assistance, and translated scripture into Aleut. Between 1836 and 1840, measles, chicken-pox and whooping-cough epidemics drastically reduced the population; thus, at the end of the decade, only 200 to 400 Aleuts lived in Unalaska.

On October 18, 1867, the United States purchased Alaska, which made Unalaska part of the U.S. territory.

In 1880, the Methodist Church opened a school and a clinic for orphans in Unalaska. Between 1899 and 1905, the Gold Rush brought many ships through Dutch Harbor, where the North American Commercial Company had a coaling station.

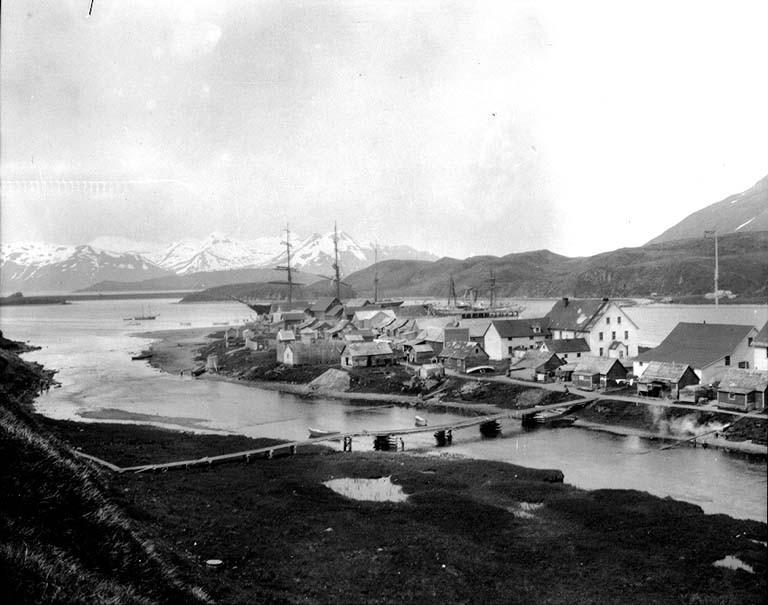
Unalaska, June 1906

During the first half of the century, the island was touched by numerous epidemics. The first epidemic occurred in 1900; in 1919, the Spanish flu touched the island. These epidemics contributed to a dramatic decrease of the population in Unalaska.

Fearing the threat from Imperial Japan during World War II, the neutral United States began fortifying Dutch Harbor in 1940, resulting in the construction of the Dutch Harbor Naval Operating Base and Fort Mears. Construction finished entirely by September 1941, three months before the surprise attack on Pearl Harbor that caused the U.S. to enter the war. On June 3, 1942, the town was attacked by Japanese air forces in the Battle of Dutch Harbor, part of the Aleutian Islands Campaign. After the attack and the Japanese occupations of Kiska and Attu, almost all of the native residents of Amaknak Island were evacuated. Many were held under poor conditions in camps in Southeast Alaska for the duration of the war; a substantial number of the internees died during the imprisonment.

Beginning in the 1950s, Unalaska became a center of the Alaskan king crab fishing industry; by 1978, it was the largest fishing port in the United States. A 1982 crash in king crab harvests decimated the industry, and the mid-1980s saw a transition to bottom fishing.

On October 25, 1977, an extremely intense extratropical system struck the area. A pressure of 926 millibars (27.35 inHg) was recorded at Dutch Harbor, which was the lowest non-tropical pressure ever recorded in the United States until December 31, 2020, when another system struck the islands with a pressure of 924.8 millibars (27.31 inHg). Winds in excess of 100 knots caused the shipwreck of MV Kuroshima in 1997.

=== Recent history ===
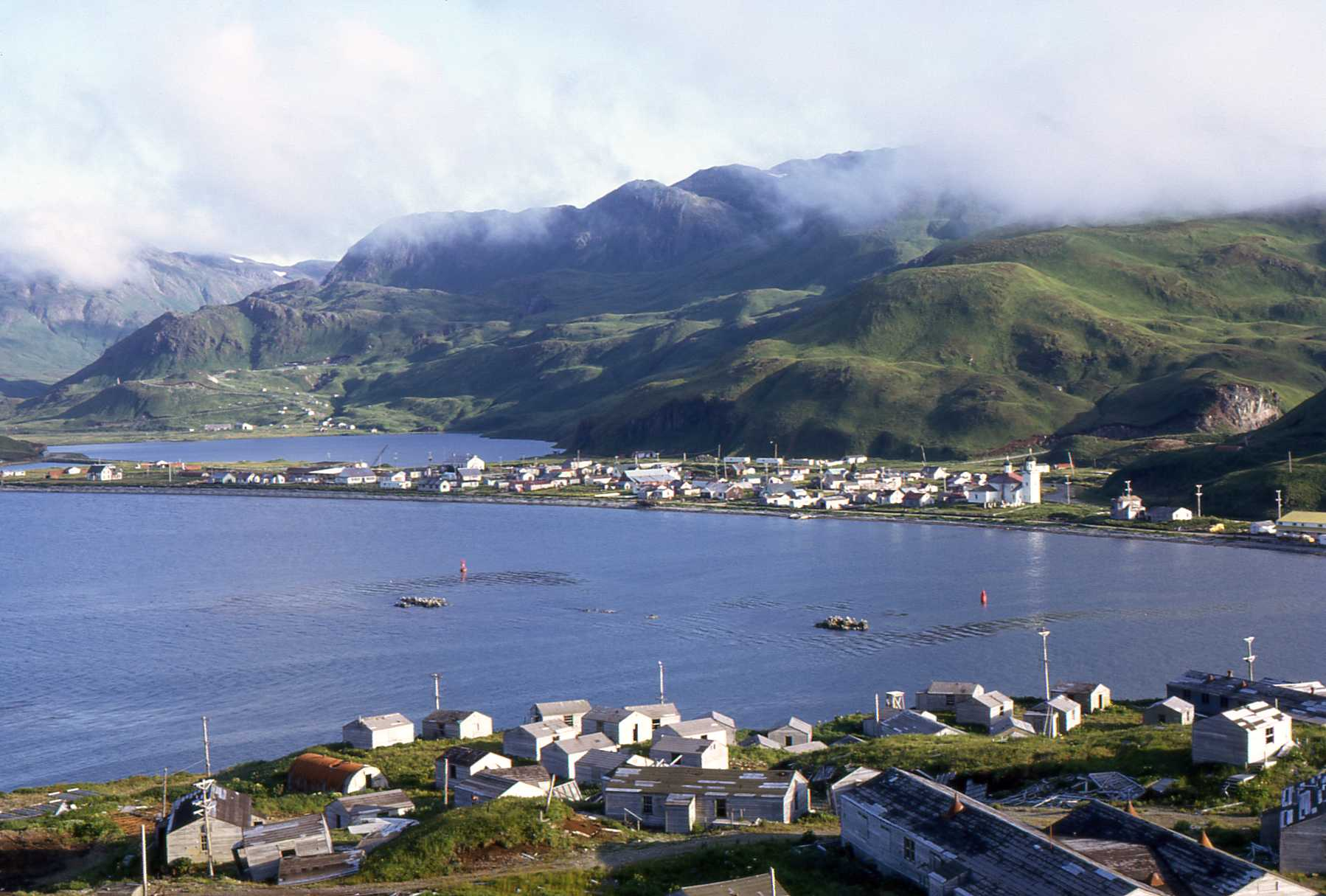
Unalaska view in 1972 with the collapsed buildings of the closed naval base in the foreground

The city has struggled with problems like alcoholism and unemployment in the past; while these problems still persist, the situation has improved in recent years. One example is the Elbow Room, a bar which locally, and later abroad, became infamous for its raucousness. It was closed in 2005.

Since 2005, the Discovery Channel's documentary show Deadliest Catch has focused on fishermen who are based in Dutch Harbor.

In 2023, Starlink's first community gateway, a small ground station, was built in Unalaska.

== Geography ==
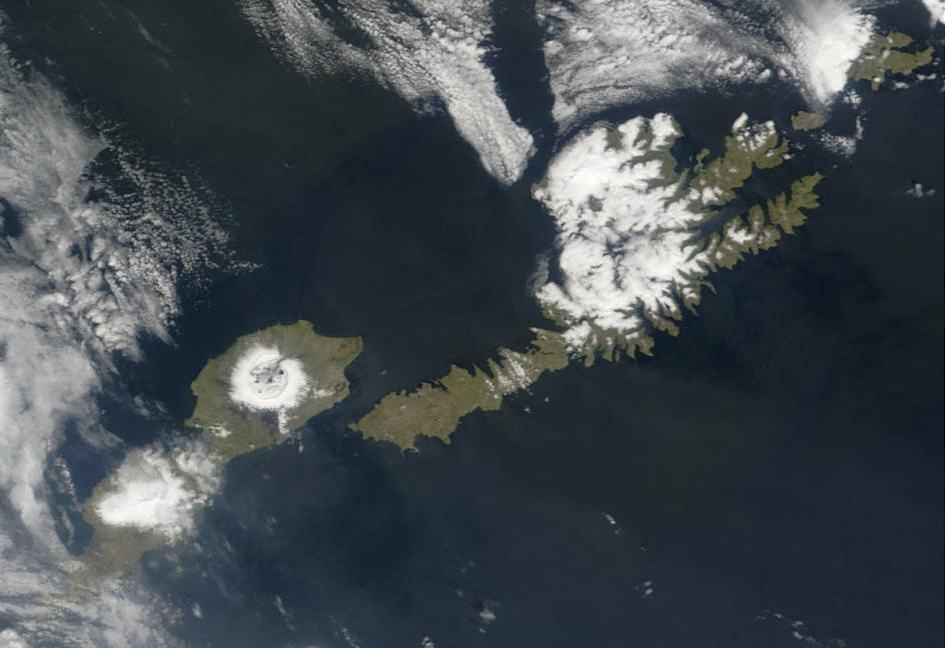
Satellite shot of the islands of Umnak (left) and Unalaska (right).

According to the U.S. Census Bureau, the city has a total area of 212.3 square miles (549.9 km^{2}), of which 111.0 square miles (287.5 km^{2}) is land and 101.3 square miles (262.4 km^{2}) (47.71%) is water.

Makushin Volcano (5,691 ft/1,735 m) is located on the island; it is not quite visible from within the town of Unalaska, though the steam rising from its cone is visible on the rare clear day. By climbing one of the smaller hills in the area, such as Pyramid Peak or Mount Newhall, it is possible to get a good look at the snow-covered cone.

=== Paleontology ===
A major find was announced in 2015 after scientists examined a group of giant tusked quadruped marine mammal fossils. The species had been unearthed during excavation for the construction of a school. They are unique shore dwellers belonging to the extinct order Desmostylia, and possibly related to Proboscidea or Sirenia. A rendition of a group was drawn by Alaskan artist Ray Troll.

=== Climate ===
As in all of the Aleutian islands in the south of Akutan Island (32 °F or 0 °C isotherm) the climate of Unalaska is subpolar oceanic (Cfc), with moderate and fairly uniform temperatures and heavy precipitation. Winters are consistently cold, but relatively mild in comparison to other parts of the state. Summers are cool, with most afternoons only reaching highs of 54 °F (12 °C) to 70 °F (21 °C). Fog is often present even when it is not raining. Summer weather is around 5 °F (2.8 °C) cooler than Southeast Alaska (Sitka), but the winter temperatures are nearly the same, although despite the higher latitudes of cities such as Sitka and Ketchikan, both of the two cities have warmer winters than Unalaska.

The mean annual temperature for Unalaska is 41.6 °F (5.3 °C), being about 33.0 °F (0.6 °C) in January and 53.7 °F (12.1 °C) in August. The coldest recorded month was February 1984, with a mean temperature of 22.9 °F (−5.1 °C), while the warmest month was August 2019 at 57.3 °F (14.1 °C); the annual mean temperature has ranged from 38.0 °F (3.3 °C) in 1916 to 44.1 °F (6.7 °C) in 2016. With about 225 rainy days a year, Unalaska is among the rainiest places in the United States. June through August are markedly the driest months of the year, with very rare thunderstorms. Precipitation is especially heavy from October to February, when frequent, often-intense storms from the North Pacific Ocean cross the area, bringing high winds and heavy precipitation in any form and sometimes changing forms (rain, freezing rain, sleet, snow). On average, December is the year's wettest month. Snowfall averages over 81 inches (210 cm) per winter season, and can be heavy from December to March.

Unalaska's recorded temperature range is from 82 °F (28 °C) in August 1982 to −8 °F (−22 °C) in January 1986. The coldest daytime maximum recorded is 11 °F (−12 °C) and the annual mean coldest day is 24 °F (−4 °C). The warmest night on record is well above the average daily summer high temperature, standing at 65 °F (18 °C), with the mean for the annual warmest night being 56 °F (13 °C).

Climate data for Dutch Harbor, Unalaska, Alaska (1991–2020 normals, (Note: Mean monthly maxima and minima (i.e. the highest and lowest temperature readings during an entire month or year) calculated based on data at said location from 1991 to 2020.) extremes 1915–present)
Month	Jan	Feb	Mar	Apr	May	Jun	Jul	Aug	Sep	Oct	Nov	Dec	Year
Record high °F (°C)	58 (14)	60 (16)	69 (21)	61 (16)	66 (19)	73 (23)	79 (26)	82 (28)	80 (27)	68 (20)	67 (19)	59 (15)	82 (28)
Mean maximum °F (°C)	46.2 (7.9)	47.3 (8.5)	48.0 (8.9)	50.0 (10.0)	54.4 (12.4)	60.9 (16.1)	68.6 (20.3)	70.9 (21.6)	63.8 (17.7)	57.3 (14.1)	52.0 (11.1)	48.4 (9.1)	72.6 (22.6)
Mean daily maximum °F (°C)	37.3 (2.9)	38.6 (3.7)	38.9 (3.8)	41.8 (5.4)	46.7 (8.2)	52.3 (11.3)	57.4 (14.1)	59.3 (15.2)	54.6 (12.6)	48.1 (8.9)	43.3 (6.3)	39.3 (4.1)	46.5 (8.1)
Daily mean °F (°C)	33.0 (0.6)	34.0 (1.1)	34.1 (1.2)	37.1 (2.8)	42.0 (5.6)	47.3 (8.5)	52.0 (11.1)	53.7 (12.1)	49.4 (9.7)	43.2 (6.2)	38.2 (3.4)	35.0 (1.7)	41.6 (5.3)
Mean daily minimum °F (°C)	28.7 (−1.8)	29.4 (−1.4)	29.2 (−1.6)	32.5 (0.3)	37.4 (3.0)	42.4 (5.8)	46.6 (8.1)	48.1 (8.9)	44.2 (6.8)	38.4 (3.6)	33.2 (0.7)	30.6 (−0.8)	36.7 (2.6)
Mean minimum °F (°C)	17.8 (−7.9)	18.2 (−7.7)	19.8 (−6.8)	24.2 (−4.3)	30.7 (−0.7)	37.2 (2.9)	41.0 (5.0)	41.0 (5.0)	35.9 (2.2)	28.5 (−1.9)	23.1 (−4.9)	21.6 (−5.8)	13.6 (−10.2)
Record low °F (°C)	−8 (−22)	0 (−18)	2 (−17)	10 (−12)	15 (−9)	30 (−1)	34 (1)	30 (−1)	23 (−5)	11 (−12)	8 (−13)	5 (−15)	−8 (−22)
Average precipitation inches (mm)	6.79 (172)	5.18 (132)	4.65 (118)	3.47 (88)	4.20 (107)	2.52 (64)	2.30 (58)	2.86 (73)	5.73 (146)	7.89 (200)	6.66 (169)	7.88 (200)	60.13 (1,527)
Average snowfall inches (cm)	22.0 (56)	14.2 (36)	16.5 (42)	6.3 (16)	0.2 (0.51)	0.0 (0.0)	0.0 (0.0)	0.0 (0.0)	0.0 (0.0)	0.4 (1.0)	6.2 (16)	15.8 (40)	81.6 (207)
Average extreme snow depth inches (cm)	12.2 (31)	10.9 (28)	8.8 (22)	4.9 (12)	0.2 (0.51)	0.0 (0.0)	0.0 (0.0)	0.0 (0.0)	0.0 (0.0)	0.2 (0.51)	2.7 (6.9)	9.0 (23)	18.9 (48)
Average precipitation days (≥ 0.01 in)	22.0	19.4	19.2	18.0	18.1	14.7	13.6	15.1	20.1	24.9	22.5	23.1	230.7
Average snowy days (≥ 0.1 in)	10.1	8.1	8.5	3.8	0.2	0.0	0.0	0.0	0.0	0.4	4.1	9.3	44.5
Source 1: NOAA
Source 2: National Weather Service

Climate data for Dutch Harbor, Unalaska, Alaska
Month	Jan	Feb	Mar	Apr	May	Jun	Jul	Aug	Sep	Oct	Nov	Dec	Year
Average sea temperature °C (°F)	4 (39)	4 (39)	4 (39)	4 (39)	5 (41)	6 (43)	8 (46)	9 (48)	9 (48)	7 (45)	6 (43)	5 (41)	5.6 (42.1)
Mean daily daylight hours	8	10	12	14	16	17	16	15	13	10	9	7	12.3
Average Ultraviolet index	0	1	2	3	5	5	6	5	3	2	1	0	3
Source: weather2travel "Dutch Harbor climate guide". weather2travel.

== Demographics ==
Historical population
Census	Pop.	Note	%±
1880	406		—
1890	317		−21.9%
1900	428		35.0%
1910	281		−34.3%
1920	299		6.4%
1930	226		−24.4%
1940	298		31.9%
1950	173		−41.9%
1960	218		26.0%
1970	342		56.9%
1980	1,322		286.5%
1990	3,089		133.7%
2000	4,283		38.7%
2010	4,376		2.2%
2020	4,254		−2.8%

Unalaska first reported on the 1880 U.S. census as the Aleut and Creole (mixed Russian & Aleut) village of Iliuliuk. Of its 406 residents, 230 were Aleut, 162 were Creole (Mixed Russian & Native) and 14 were White. It was the 9th-largest community in Alaska. In 1890, it returned as Unalaska, with 317 residents. This included a majority of 165 Creoles, 84 Natives, 66 Whites and 2 Asians (the total population included adjacent Dutch Harbor, and 5 docked vessels including the steamers Arago and Dora and schooners Nellie Martin, Pearl and Matthew Turner). In 1900, it reported as Unalaska again, but did not present a racial breakdown. It reported again as Iliuliuk in 1910, but has reported from 1920 onwards as Unalaska. It was formally incorporated in 1942.

=== Racial and ethnic composition ===
Unalaska city, Alaska – Racial and ethnic composition Note: the US Census treats Hispanic/Latino as an ethnic category. This table excludes Latinos from the racial categories and assigns them to a separate category. Hispanics/Latinos may be of any race.
Race / Ethnicity (NH = Non-Hispanic)	Pop 2000	Pop 2010	Pop 2020	% 2000	% 2010	% 2020
White alone (NH)	1,780	1,473	1,326	41.56%	33.66%	31.17%
Black or African American alone (NH)	157	287	221	3.67%	6.56%	5.20%
Native American or Alaska Native alone (NH)	323	260	182	7.54%	5.94%	4.28%
Asian alone (NH)	1,307	1,397	1,483	30.52%	31.92%	34.86%
Native Hawaiian or Pacific Islander alone (NH)	24	95	221	0.56%	2.17%	5.20%
Other race alone (NH)	4	5	8	0.09%	0.11%	0.19%
Mixed race or Multiracial (NH)	137	193	219	3.20%	4.41%	5.15%
Hispanic or Latino (any race)	551	666	594	12.86%	15.22%	13.96%
Total	4,283	4,376	4,254	100.00%	100.00%	100.00%

=== 2020 census ===
As of the 2020 census, Unalaska had a population of 4,254. The median age was 39.8 years. 11.4% of residents were under the age of 18 and 5.1% of residents were 65 years of age or older. For every 100 females there were 191.8 males, and for every 100 females age 18 and over there were 213.2 males age 18 and over.

0.0% of residents lived in urban areas, while 100.0% lived in rural areas.

There were 641 households in Unalaska, of which 37.6% had children under the age of 18 living in them. Of all households, 44.1% were married-couple households, 27.5% were households with a male householder and no spouse or partner present, and 19.7% were households with a female householder and no spouse or partner present. About 32.9% of all households were made up of individuals and 7.0% had someone living alone who was 65 years of age or older.

There were 776 housing units, of which 17.4% were vacant. The homeowner vacancy rate was 0.9% and the rental vacancy rate was 4.8%.

Racial composition as of the 2020 census
Race	Number	Percent
White	1,386	32.6%
Black or African American	222	5.2%
American Indian and Alaska Native	195	4.6%
Asian	1,494	35.1%
Native Hawaiian and Other Pacific Islander	221	5.2%
Some other race	421	9.9%
Two or more races	315	7.4%
Hispanic or Latino (of any race)	594	14.0%

The most reported detailed ancestries were Filipino (33.3%), Mexican (9.2%), Ukrainian (5.5%), Samoan (4.7%), German (4.5%), and English (4.3%).

=== 2010 census ===
In the census of 2010, there were 4,376 people, 927 households, and 533 families residing in the city. There were 1106 housing units. The racial makeup of the city was 39% White, 7% Black or African American, 6% Native American, 33% Asian (28% Filipino, 3% Vietnamese, 1% Japanese, 1% Other Asian), 2% Pacific Islander, 7% from other races, and 6% from two or more races. Hispanic or Latino of any race were 15% of the population.

There were 927 households, out of which 34% had children under the age of 18 living with them, 43% were married couples living together, 8% had a female householder with no husband present, and 43% were non-families. 35% of all households had individuals under 18 and 5% had someone living who was 65 years of age or older. The average household size was 2.5 and the average family size was 3.2.

In the city, the population was spread out, with 15% under the age of 20, 6% from 20 to 24, 40% from 25 to 44, 36% from 45 to 64, and 3% who were 65 years of age or older. The median age was 40.7 years. For every 100 females, there were 194.8 males. For every 100 females age 18 and over, there were 218.7 males.

== Economy ==
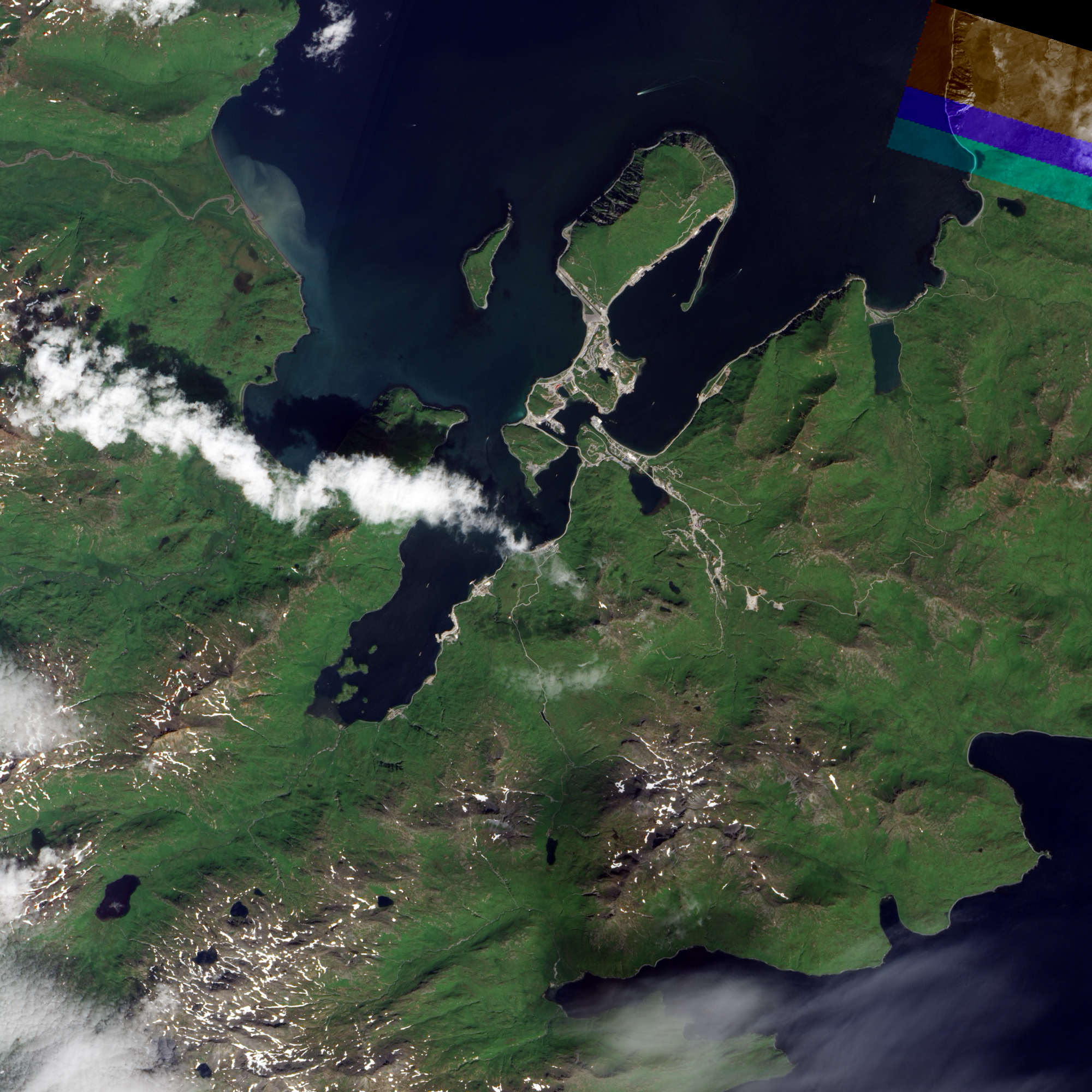
Satellite view of Dutch Harbor

The port of Unalaska / Dutch Harbor is the main port and field base for the storied Bering Sea king crab fishery. The Dutch Harbor crabbing fleet is featured in the television show Deadliest Catch, a documentary-style show on the Discovery Channel, and Dutch Harbor's facilities and local pub are featured prominently in numerous episodes.

Dutch Harbor has also been the largest fisheries port in the United States, in terms of volume of seafood caught, for nearly every year since 1981. Until 2000, it also ranked first in terms of the dollar value of its catch; since 2000, however, the port of New Bedford, Massachusetts, has outranked Dutch Harbor in that category.

A pilot project in Unalaska / Dutch Harbor, Alaska, is producing fish oil biodiesel from the local fish processing industry in conjunction with the University of Alaska Fairbanks. It is rarely economical to ship the fish oil elsewhere and Alaskan communities are heavily dependent on diesel power generation. The local factories process 3.5 million gallons of fish oil annually.

== Government ==
=== Local government ===
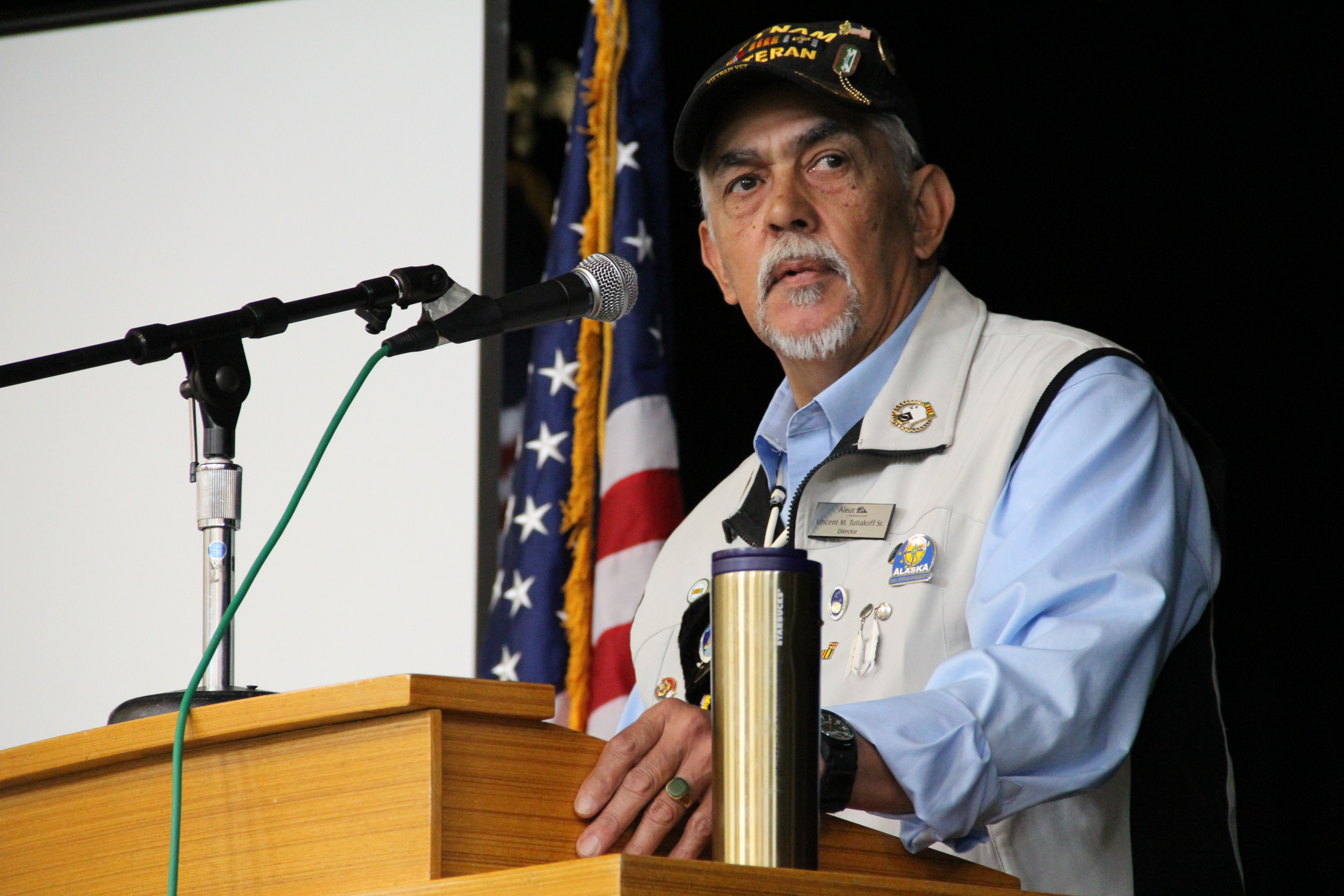
Unalaska's mayor Vincent M. Tutiakoff Sr., shown in June 2017

Unalaska has a council–manager form of government. The mayor is elected at large, and serves a three-year term; powers are mostly ceremonial.

The city council is the legislative body of the city; it is made up of six members, who are elected at large by a direct vote of the city's electorate. They also serve three-year terms. The city council has for its mission to "enact the laws of the city, set the mill rate for property taxes within the city, approve the annual budget for the city, and appropriate funds to provide for city services".

The incumbent mayor is Vincent M. Tutiakoff Sr. Former mayor Frank Kelty served more terms than any other Unalaska mayor, with a total of six terms over the years.

Unalaska also maintains its own municipal police department.

=== Legislative representation ===
Unalaska is located in the Aleutians No. 2 voting precinct, in the 37th election district and Senate district S. The city is represented in the Alaska House of Representatives by Bryce Edgmon, an independent from Dillingham, and in the Alaska Senate by Lyman Hoffman, a Democrat from Bethel.

Unalaska was home to Carl Moses, who moved there from King Cove in the mid-1960s and was a business and political leader in the community for decades until shortly before his death in 2014. Moses was the longest-serving member in the history of the Alaska House, serving a total of 22 years, from 1965 to 1973 and from 1993 to 2007. He also served under three different political parties, first as a Republican, later switching to Democrat, and also served the majority of one term as a member of the Alaskan Independence Party. The only other Unalaska resident to serve in the legislature was Eric G. Sutcliffe, at the time owner of Stormy's Restaurant. Sutcliffe served a single term in the House, from 1981 to 1983.

== Education ==
=== Primary and secondary education ===
As Unalaska is designated a first-class city and located within the Unorganized Borough, it is required under state law to operate its own schools rather than participate in a Rural Education Attendance Area. The Unalaska City School District reported an enrollment of 418 students for the 2018–2019 school year, split roughly evenly between Eagle's View Elementary School (pre-elementary through 5th grade) and Unalaska Jr/Sr High School (6th through 12th grades).

UCSD was voted one of the best 100 school districts in the United States by Offspring Magazine, a Forbes publication. It has also consistently been one of the highest-scoring schools in Alaska in both the Standards-based exams and Alaska Exit Exam. In 2006, the Alaska Association of School Boards awarded the school district with the Outstanding School Board Award and Superintendent of the Year award.

Unalaska Headstart also serves the community's pre-elementary education needs.

Previously the Aleutian Region School District, which serves rural areas in the western Aleutian Islands, had its administrative headquarters in Unalaska; the school board's mailing address was in Unalaska.

=== Tertiary education ===
The University of Alaska Fairbanks also has a campus in Unalaska, the University of Alaska, Aleutian Pribilof campus. This college is part of the College of Rural Alaska network and offers both conventional classroom and distance classes. It offers university classes, community workshops, local courses, as well as dual credit for high school students.

11% of Unalaska residents age 25 and older have a bachelor's or advanced college degree.

== Transportation ==
Unalaska is connected to the rest of the state by air via the Unalaska Airport, a 4,500 by 100 ft (1,372 by 30 m) paved runway owned by the state of Alaska, from which daily flights are scheduled. These flights consist of turboprop service to and from Anchorage. A seaplane base is also available. In 2002, the state of Alaska changed the name of the airport to "Tom Madsen Airport", after a bush pilot killed in an accident that year, although the FAA still uses the airport's original name.

The Alaska Marine Highway operates once every two weeks from Kodiak between April and October. Out of the ten major docks in Unalaska, three are operated by the city. A World War II sub dock was refurbished and now offers ship repair services.

There are approximately 7 miles (11 km) of paved road, and 38 miles (61 km) of road total in Unalaska. According to traffic counts taken by the Alaska Department of Transportation and Public Facilities, the most heavily traveled roads in Unalaska are Airport Beach Road between 5th Street and East Point Road, 5th Street between Broadway Avenue and Airport Beach Road, and Broadway Avenue between 5th Street and Steward Road. These roads recorded an annual average daily traffic volume of approximately 3,000 cars.

== Churches ==
- Russian Orthodox Church of the Holy Ascension of Christ, oldest Russian Church in the United States, built 1825
- Saint Christopher-By-The-Sea Catholic Church
- United Methodist Church-Unalaska
- Unalaska Reformed Church Southern Baptist Convention
- The Church of Jesus Christ of Latter-day Saints

== Sister city ==
Unalaska has been twinned with Petropavlovsk-Kamchatsky, Russia, since 1990.

== Unalaska in Fiction ==
The Jim Butcher short story "Cold Case," which is set in the universe of The Dresden Files, takes place in Unalaska. It was published in the 2016 anthology Shadowed Souls and again in the 2018 Dresden Files short story collection Brief Cases.
