= Amaknak Island =

Most populous of the Aleutian Islands, Alaska, United States

Coordinates: 53°54′37″N 166°32′12″W

Location in Alaska

Amaknak Island (Russian: Амакнак) or Umaknak Island (Aleut: Amaxnax̂; Russian: Умакнак) is the most populated island in the Aleutian Islands, an archipelago which is part of the U.S. state of Alaska.

== Geography ==
Amaknak is an islet of the Fox Islands archipelago, a portion of the Aleutian Islands, in the Aleutians West Census Area of southwestern Alaska. Amaknak Island is located within Unalaska Bay, an inlet of the Bering Sea on the northeast side of Unalaska Island. At their closest point—the channel that leads from Unalaska Bay to Iliuliuk Harbor —the Amaknak and Unalaska islands are only about 200 feet (61 meters) apart. There is a 500-foot (152-meter) bridge joining the islands at another close point, where Iliuliuk Harbor connects with Captains Bay.

Dutch Harbor occupies the central portion of Amaknak Island.

Amaknak's land area is only 3.3 mi^{2} (8.5 km^{2}), and dwarfed by its neighbor Unalaska Island with a land area of 1,051 sq. miles (2,722 km^{2}). The highest point on Amaknak is Mount Ballyhoo.

== Population ==
Despite its small size, Amaknak is the most populous of all the islands of the Aleutians chain, with 2,524 residents as of the 2000 census. Though located within the boundaries of the City of Unalaska, the inhabitants of Amaknak generally regard themselves as residents of Dutch Harbor, which is the portion of the City of Unalaska located on Amaknak Island. (The remaining 41% of Unalaska's residents live on Unalaska Island.) The indigenous population includes Unangan Aleut.

== History ==
In 1938, the General Board of the United States Navy recommended to construct two military installations next to each other on Amaknak island namely Dutch Harbor Naval Operating Base and Fort Mears, U.S. Army, in response to the growing war threat with Imperial Japan. This began in July 1940. The first United States Army troops arrived in June 1941 and an air base constructed by the United States Navy was finished in September 1941. At the time of the surprise attack on Pearl Harbor, these were the only military installations in the Aleutian Islands.

Not until the 1980s studies were done by the US Army Corps of Engineers to test for toxic materials left behind in the buildings like asbestos, arsenic, and chemicals in waste drums like diesel or heating oil or transformers like polychlorinated biphenyls. As of 2026 the US ACE had not repeated these studies. In 2024, The University of Alaska conducted soil testing at 18 sites in Unalaska and in subsistence foods and found widespread contamination.

== See also ==
- Battle of Dutch Harbor
- Dutch Harbor Naval Operating Base and Fort Mears, U.S. Army
