= List of national historic sites and historical parks of the United States =

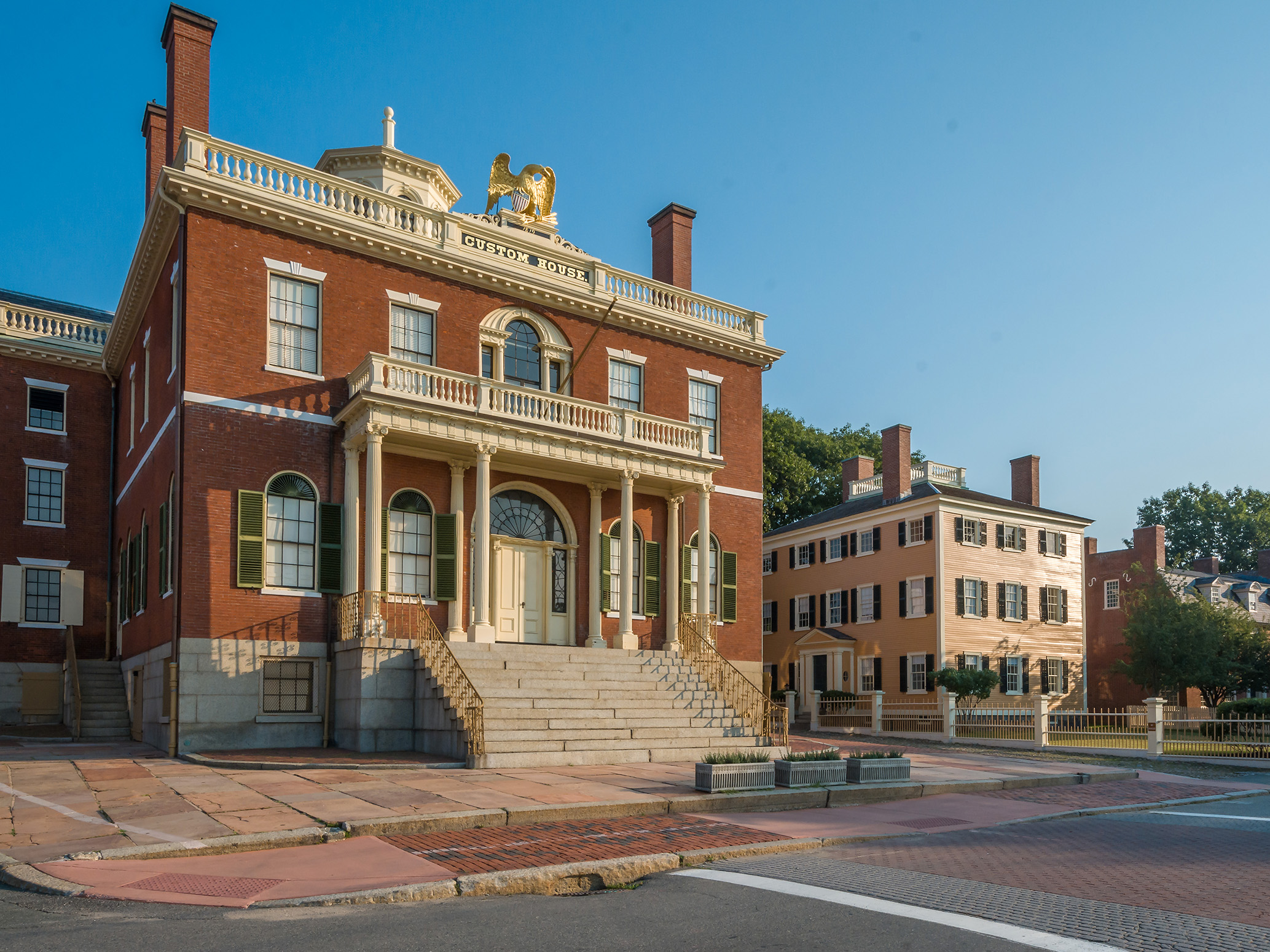
Salem Maritime National Historical Park in Salem, Massachusetts, was the first national historic site to be established in the U.S.

National Historic Sites (NHSes) and National Historical Parks (NHPs) are officially recognized areas of nationally historic significance in the United States. They are usually owned and managed by the federal government. An NHS usually contains a single historical feature directly associated with its subject, while an NHP is an area that generally extends beyond single properties or buildings to include a mix of historic and later structures and sometimes significant natural features.

There are 64 NHPs and 85 NHSes. Most NHPs and NHSes are managed by the National Park Service (NPS). Some federally designated sites are owned by local authorities or privately owned, but are authorized to request assistance from the NPS as affiliated areas. One property is managed by the U.S. Forest Service: Grey Towers National Historic Site.

Since October 15, 1966, all historic areas in the NPS, including NHPs and NHSes, are automatically listed on the National Register of Historic Places (NRHP). There are about 90,000 NRHP sites, the large majority of which are neither owned nor managed by the NPS. Of these, about 2,600 have been designated at the highest status as National Historic Landmark (NHL) sites.

== History ==
After its founding in 1916, the National Park Service initially oversaw sites of primarily scenic and natural significance, including national parks and national monuments. Historians soon began recommending preservation of sites relating to human history. Congress created Colonial National Monument in 1930 to protect the Jamestown Settlement and Yorktown battlefield in Virginia as one of the first new historical areas, and it was renamed a national historical park in 1936. It then established Morristown National Historical Park, the 1779–1780 winter encampment of the Continental Army in New Jersey, on March 2, 1933, as the first NHP: The U.S. House committee noted that the new designation was logical for the area and set a new precedent, with comparison to the national military parks, which were then in the War Department. The park's establishment allowed the NPS to have an administrative historical program with professional historians. President Franklin D. Roosevelt reorganized the agency to also oversee memorials and military parks with historic significance later in 1933, substantially broadening the NPS's mandate.

In 1935, Congress passed the Historic Sites Act (Pub. L. 49–666), which established that "it is a national policy to preserve for public use historic sites, buildings and objects of national significance for the inspiration and benefit of the people of the United States." This expanded upon the Antiquities Act of 1906, which gave the President the ability to order "the protection of objects of historic and scientific interest." The Historic Sites Act directed the National Park Service to survey historic sites which may be of national significance, as well as restore and acquire properties. The Historic American Buildings Survey began to document the country's architectural heritage and identify buildings for potential protection. Initially the Secretary of the Interior could designate national historic sites, though this did not include funding for acquisition or administration without congressional action. Salem Maritime National Historic Site was the first place to be preserved as a national historic site, created by Secretary Harold L. Ickes's secretarial order on March 17, 1938. It had followed his designation of the Jefferson National Expansion Memorial in 1935; many historic sites in the National Park System continue to be protected under different designation types. Hopewell Furnace National Historic Site was designated later that year, another example of industrial heritage.

As the NPS developed criteria for nationally significant historic sites in the late 1930s, it aimed to identify unique sites that could each tell a broad story and would fit together to cover all aspects of American history. Surveys of sites were guided by themes and chronologies to ensure a diverse and comprehensive selection of those most representative of different eras and geographies, with less political influence over site selection. In the 1950s, the Mission 66 program revived historic studies that had lagged during World War II and saw the creation of the National Historic Landmarks program as a method to recognize important sites. From the 1960s to 1990s, the NPS evolved from a thematic framework, in which numerous specific themes and subthemes of American history were expected to each be included in some way in the system, to a conceptual framework, whereby both new and existing park units would be examined more holistically for ways to study history such as "creating social movements and institutions," "developing the American economy," and "peopling places." In the 20th century, potential new park units have been recommended not so much on "an orderly, balanced, and comprehensive" preservation of "outstanding examples", as Chief Historian Ronald Lee put it, but on those mandated to be studied by Congress, most of whose requests are recommended against by the NPS.

A 1973 NPS publication outlined policies for administration of historical areas, which were distinct from its natural and recreational areas. This included not only NHSes and NHPs but also national military parks, national battlefields, national battlefield parks, national battlefield sites, national memorials, and some national monuments; at that time there were 178 such areas, and management focused on "maintaining and where necessary restoring the historical integrity of structures, sites and objects significant to the commemoration or illustration of the historical story". But because most units contained a combination of natural, historic, and recreational lands, the General Authorities Act of 1970 made all areas equal within the National Park System; separate policy manuals for each were replaced in 1975 with one that would tailor policies in each park respective to the purpose of zones within.

== National Historic Sites ==
National Historic Sites are generally federally owned and administered properties, though some remain under private or local government ownership. There are currently 85 NHSes, of which seventy-five are official NPS units, nine are NPS affiliated areas, and one is managed by the United States Forest Service.

Derived from the Historic Sites Act of 1935, a number of NHSes were established by United States Secretaries of the Interior, but most have been authorized by acts of Congress. In 1937, the first NHS was created in Salem, Massachusetts, in order to preserve and interpret the maritime history of New England and the United States; in 2025 Salem Maritime NHS was redesignated as an NHP.

National Historic Sites
Name	Image	Location	Area	Description
Allegheny Portage Railroad		Pennsylvania	1,284.27 acres (5.1973 km^{2})	The Allegheny Portage Railroad was the first railroad through the Allegheny Mountains in central Pennsylvania that connected the Midwestern United States to the Eastern seaboard, used as a portage railway to haul river boats and barges over the divide between the Ohio and the Susquehanna Rivers.
Amache	An_etched_wooden_sign_"Amache_Japanese_Relocation_Camp,"_complete_with_outlines_of_buildings,_one_of_the_only_remnants,_save_for_a_few_cement_foundations_a_little_nearby_graveyard,_of_the_Amache_Camp_LCCN2015632197	Colorado		Granada War Relocation Center, or Camp Amache, was a concentration camp where more than 10,000 Japanese Americans were interned during World War II.
Andersonville		Georgia	515.61 acres (2.0866 km^{2})	The Andersonville National Historic Site, a former Confederate prisoner-of-war camp, is located near Andersonville, Georgia. The prison operated during the final fourteen months of the American Civil War, February 1864 – April 1865. It was overcrowded, with an inadequate water supply, inadequate food, and unsanitary conditions. Of the roughly 45,000 Union prisoners held there during the war, nearly 13,000 died.
Andrew Johnson		Tennessee	16.68 acres (0.0675 km^{2})	Andrew Johnson was elected vice president in 1864 and was sworn in as 17th President of the United States after the assassination of President Lincoln on April 15, 1865. The historic site encompasses the homestead in Greeneville, Tennessee, that he and his family lived in.
Bent's Old Fort		Colorado	798.54 acres (3.2316 km^{2})	Bent's Old Fort was built in 1833 in southeastern Colorado. Before it was destroyed in 1849, the fort was the only major white American permanent settlement on the Santa Fe Trail between Missouri and the Mexican settlements to support trade with trappers and Southern Cheyenne and Arapaho Plains Indians.
Blackwell School		Texas		The Blackwell School was a segregrated school that served Marfa, Texas's Hispanic population from its construction in 1909 until the end of school segration in 1965.
Boston African American		Massachusetts	0.59 acres (0.0024 km^{2})	The Beacon Hill neighborhood was home to most of Boston's Black population before the Civil War, much of whom were slaves who escaped via the Underground Railroad. Sites on the Black Heritage Trail include the 1806 African Meeting House, the oldest standing black church in the United States; the Robert Gould Shaw Memorial; schools; and homes of several abolitionists.
Carl Sandburg Home		North Carolina	268.49 acres (1.0865 km^{2})	Carl Sandburg Home National Historic Site is located in the village of Flat Rock, North Carolina, and preserves Connemara, the home of Pulitzer Prize-winning poet and writer Carl Sandburg. Sandburg and his family moved here in 1945 for the peace and solitude needed for his writing and for the roughly 30 acres of pastureland for his wife, Lilian, to raise her champion dairy goats.
Carter G. Woodson Home		Washington, D.C.	0.15 acres (0.00061 km^{2})	Carter G. Woodson, the pioneering historian, author, and journalist who founded Black History Month, lived in this three-story rowhouse from 1922 until his death in 1950. There he operated the Association for the Study of Negro Life and History and published the Negro History Bulletin and the Journal of Negro History.
Charles Pinckney		South Carolina	28.45 acres (0.1151 km^{2})	Charles Pinckney was a South Carolinian governor, Founding Father, and signer of the United States Constitution. He served as South Carolina's governor for four terms; his first two terms ran consecutively from 1789 to 1792, his third from 1796 to 1798, and his fourth from 1806 to 1808. Pinckney used the site, which was then known as Snee Farm, as a plantation and country retreat.
Chicago Portage (affiliated area)		Illinois	91.2 acres (0.369 km^{2})	The Chicago Portage served as one of the "most important travel routes of the mid-continent." In 1673, explorers Jacques Marquette and Louis Jolliet first crossed the Chicago Portage. The site marks the western end of the historic portage linking the Great Lakes to the Mississippi River with a statue of Marquette, Jolliet, and a Native American with a canoe. The statue was created by artist Ferdinand Rebechini.
Chimney Rock (affiliated area)		Nebraska	83 acres (0.34 km^{2})	Chimney Rock is a prominent geological rock formation in western Nebraska that served as a landmark along the Oregon Trail, the California Trail, and the Mormon Trail during the mid-19th century.
Christiansted		U.S. Virgin Islands	27.15 acres (0.1099 km^{2})	Christiansted, the capital of the former Danish West Indies on St. Croix Island, was an important part of the urban development of the Virgin Islands and the influence of the Dutch on the area. The site consists of six historical sites, including Fort Christianvaern, a Dutch fort that now serves as one of the best-preserved examples of Caribbean colonial fortification.
Clara Barton		Maryland	8.59 acres (0.0348 km^{2})	Clara Barton, humanitarian and founder of the American Red Cross, lived in this house from 1897 until her death in 1912. The house served as headquarters and a warehouse for the Red Cross. When it was established in 1974, the Clara Barton National Historic Site was the first national historic site dedicated to the accomplishments of a woman.
Edgar Allan Poe		Pennsylvania	0.52 acres (0.0021 km^{2})	Edgar Allan Poe, regarded as a major figure in the American Romanticism movement, lived in this house. He likely rented it for a year or less in 1843, but it remains Poe's only residence still standing in Philadelphia. The site details Poe's time in Philadelphia, where he wrote some of his most famous works including "The Tell-Tale Heart" and "The Raven".
Eisenhower		Pennsylvania	690.46 acres (2.7942 km^{2})	Dwight D. Eisenhower, the 34th President of the United States and Five-Star General, lived in this home from 1950 until two years before his death in 1969. While president and afterwards, Eisenhower hosted many important dignitaries, politicians, and foreign leaders at the house.
Eleanor Roosevelt		New York	180.50 acres (0.7305 km^{2})	Eleanor Roosevelt, the First Lady from 1933 to 1945 and Ambassador to the United Nations, used this property, named Val-Kill, for both personal entertainment, hosting, and helping employ local farming families in handcraft traditions. The site now commemorates Roosevelt's life and accomplishments.
Eugene O'Neill		California	13.19 acres (0.0534 km^{2})	The only American playwright to win a Nobel Prize in Literature, Eugene O'Neill bought this site, which he called Tao House, with the money awarded to him for the aforementioned prize. He lived in the house from 1937 to 1944, writing plays such as The Iceman Cometh and A Moon for the Misbegotten.
Fallen Timbers Battlefield and Fort Miamis (affiliated area)		Ohio	9 acres (0.036 km^{2})	The Battle of Fallen Timbers, a decisive American victory over Native American and British opponents which effectively ended the Northwest Indian War, was fought on this site on August 20, 1794. Originally, a site in nearby Maumee was incorrectly identified as the battle site, but this area has since been renamed the Fallen Timbers State Memorial and is now preserved as a part of this park.
First Ladies		Ohio	0.46 acres (0.0019 km^{2})	Commemorating the accomplishment of First Ladies of the United States, this site holds exhibits on the evolving roles of first ladies in the American presidency and American society. The site also preserves the home of First Lady Ida McKinley.
Ford's Theatre		Washington, D.C.	0.30 acres (0.0012 km^{2})	President Abraham Lincoln was assassinated on April 14, 1865, while watching a performance of Our American Cousin at Ford's Theatre. He was brought across the street to the Petersen House where he died the next morning. The theatre continues to produce live plays and has a museum of artifacts related to Lincoln, and the Petersen House, the first historic home purchased by the U.S. government, is furnished as it was the night Lincoln died.
Fort Bowie		Arizona	999.45 acres (4.0446 km^{2})	A United States Army outpost established in 1862 by the California Volunteers. The base was the focal point of military operations in the Apache Wars, including the surrender of Geronimo in 1886 and the banishment of the Chiricahuas to Florida and Alabama thereafter.
Fort Davis		Texas	523.00 acres (2.1165 km^{2})	Originally established in 1854 to protect emigrants, mail coaches, and freight wagons on the trans-Pecos portion of the San Antonio–El Paso Road and the Chihuahua Trail, the fort saw very sparse use. Thus, it remains one of the best examples of a United States Army fort in the southwestern United States. The fort also holds particular importance in regards to African-Americans in the army, as the 9th and 10th Cavalry regiments (all-black regiments also known as "The Buffalo Soldiers") were stationed at Fort Davis after the Civil War, helping rebuild the site.
Fort Laramie		Wyoming	873.11 acres (3.5334 km^{2})	Founded as a private trading-post in the 1830s to service the overland fur trade, the site became an important trading post due to its location near the South Pass of the Rocky Mountains. The fort was purchased by the United States Army in 1849 to protect the many wagon trains of migrant travelers on the Oregon Trail. Fort Laramie was also a notable stop on the Mormon Trail.
Fort Larned		Kansas	718.39 acres (2.9072 km^{2})	Established in 1859 as the Camp on Pawnee Fork, the site protected travelers on the Santa Fe Trail from hostile Native Americans. The fort saw occasional use during various Native American conflicts throughout the 1800s and was raided by Kiowa Indians in 1864. In 1867, the fort served as a meeting place for General Winfield Scott Hancock and chiefs from the Cheyenne tribe, indirectly beginning Hancock's War.
Fort Point		California	29.00 acres (0.1174 km^{2})	Originally established in 1794 by Spain, the fort was captured by the United States in the Mexican-American War and refortified in the 1840s during the gold rush. The modern Fort Point was completed in the 1850s, but saw little use. In 1937, the Golden Gate Bridge was built directly above the fort, though it is a part of the Golden Gate National Recreation Area and not the site itself.
Fort Raleigh		North Carolina	515.73 acres (2.0871 km^{2})	This site preserves Roanoke Colony, the first English settlement in the present-day United States. Founded in 1587 by Sir Walter Raleigh, the colony was abandoned sometime between 1587 and 1590 and no survivors were discovered; many have dubbed it the "Lost Colony". During the American Civil War, the site became the Roanoke Island Freedmen's Colony, a contraband camp for slave refugees overseen by the Union Army.
Fort Scott		Kansas	20.11 acres (0.0814 km^{2})	Established in 1842 as a midway point between Fort Leavenworth and Fort Gibson, Fort Scott provided protection to settlers migrating west from Native Americans in the Great Plains. The site saw little attention until the passage of the Kansas–Nebraska Act in 1854. Free-soilers and pro-slavery advocates occupied separate parts of the fort, leading to continued conflict. The Union Army took the fort during the American Civil War, holding it throughout the war.
Fort Smith		Arkansas, Oklahoma	75.00 acres (0.3035 km^{2})	Established in 1871, Fort Smith contains the building which once housed the United States District Court for the Western District of Arkansas, which had jurisdiction over federal cases in Indian Territory. The fort was also a stop on the Trail of Tears for the Choctaw and Cherokee people. The site contains a walking tour detailing the forced relocation.
Fort Union Trading Post		Montana, North Dakota	440.14 acres (1.7812 km^{2})	Fort Union was regarded as the most important fur trading post on the upper Missouri River, as it is situated at the confluence of the Missouri and its tributary, the Yellowstone River. Much of the site is a modern reconstruction based on archaeological excavations and contemporary drawings.
Fort Vancouver		Washington, Oregon	206.72 acres (0.8366 km^{2})	The Hudson's Bay Company had their northwest headquarters at Fort Vancouver, where they operated the fur trade and oversaw vast territory in the 1820s to 1840s. A reconstructed fort shows life in the Columbia District. It is adjacent to the Pearson Air Museum and the U.S. Army's former Vancouver Barracks, and the home of HBC superintendent John McLoughlin is in Oregon City.
Frederick Douglass		Washington, D.C.	8.57 acres (0.0347 km^{2})	Frederick Douglass was a prominent abolitionist who gave speeches and wrote books about his time enslaved and social reform. He spent the last 17 years of his life at this home, called Cedar Hill, in the Anacostia neighborhood, where he wrote an autobiography and was a member of D.C. society. The house is restored with many of Douglass's original belongings.
Frederick Law Olmsted		Massachusetts	7.21 acres (0.0292 km^{2})	Frederick Law Olmsted was an influential landscape architect, responsible for such projects as Central Park in New York City and the Emerald Necklace around Boston. Olmsted moved to this site, called Fairsted, in 1883 and established the world's first full-scale professional office for the practice of landscape design. His sons and successors would continue the practice for the next century.
Friendship Hill		Pennsylvania	674.56 acres (2.7298 km^{2})	Albert Gallatin, a notable early American politician and the longest-serving Secretary of the Treasury, lived in this estate from 1788 to 1832. During this time, Gallatin was instrumental in reducing the national debt, purchasing the Louisiana Territory and funding the Lewis and Clark Expedition; an obscure figure in modern times, the Park Service dubs Gallatin the "forgotten founding father".
Gloria Dei (Old Swedes') Church (affiliated area)		Pennsylvania	3.7 acres (0.015 km^{2})	Swedish immigrants were an important part of early Pennsylvanian history, with New Sweden existing in current-day Philadelphia from 1638 to 1655. This church, known locally as Old Swedes', is the oldest church in Pennsylvania and the second-oldest Swedish church in the United States. The site highlights the influence of Swedish culture and people on early America.
Grant–Kohrs Ranch		Montana	1,618.43 acres (6.5496 km^{2})	Originally established for fur trading in 1862, this ranch would eventually grow to cover over ten million acres of Powell County, Montana, under the ownership of cattle baron Conrad Kohrs. Though the current-day park is only 1,618 acres, it illustrates the role of cattlemen in American history.
Grey Towers		Pennsylvania	102 acres (0.41 km^{2})	Also known as the Gifford Pinchot House or the Pinchot Institute, this house was the home of Gifford Pinchot, the first head of the United States Forest Service. The house was commissioned in 1884 by Pinchot's father, James Pinchot, and remained in the Pinchot family until 1960, when the property was donated to the Forest Service. It became a National Historic Landmark shortly thereafter, one of the first places in the country to be designated as such.
Hampton		Maryland	62.04 acres (0.2511 km^{2})	The 1790 Georgian style Hampton Mansion was once the largest residence in America and has several rooms with original furnishings and artworks; it is the only NPS site preserved for its architectural merit. Long owned by the aristocratic Ridgely family, the plantation estate had more than 300 enslaved people farming and maintaining the grounds, which include terraced gardens, a farm house, and original slave quarters.
Harry S. Truman		Missouri	12.59 acres (0.0509 km^{2})	Harry Truman served as the 33rd President of the United States, overseeing the end of World War II. Though born in nearby Lamar, Missouri, Truman lived in this house after marrying his wife Bess Truman in 1919 until his death in 1972. The house itself was built by Bess Truman's maternal grandfather and stands across the street from her birthplace. Though Truman's legal name was Harry S. Truman, the site's name is officially styled without a period following S, his middle name.
Herbert Hoover		Iowa	186.80 acres (0.7560 km^{2})	31st President of the United States Herbert Hoover lived in West Branch, Iowa, for the first eleven years of his life, with the cottage he lived in from 1879 to 1884 serving as the Hoover's only remaining residence at the site. The site also includes several associated buildings related to the Hoover's life in West Branch, including a recreation of Hoover's father's blacksmith shop and the home of Hoover's uncle Laban Miles, an Indian Agent for Rutherford B. Hayes. Hoover and his wife, Lou, are both buried within the site's grounds.
Home of Franklin D. Roosevelt		New York	838.43 acres (3.3930 km^{2})	Franklin D. Roosevelt, the 32nd and longest-serving President of the United States, was born and raised at Springwood, his family's estate on the banks of the Hudson River. Roosevelt essentially lived at Springwood his entire life, and frequently visited even during his presidency. It also served as one of Roosevelt's Summer White Houses, where he hosted foreign dignitaries such as King George VI and William Lyon Mackenzie King. Roosevelt, his wife, Eleanor, and their dog Fala are buried together at the site.
Honouliuli		Hawaii	154.46 acres (0.6251 km^{2})	The Honouliuli Internment Camp, Hawaiʻi's largest and longest-operating internment camp, opened in 1943 and closed in 1946. The camp imprisoned prisoners of war during World War II, at its height imprisoning nearly 4,000 and making it the largest prisoner of war camp in Hawaiʻi. Japanese-Americans were also interned at the site following Executive Order 9066.
Hopewell Furnace		Pennsylvania	848.06 acres (3.4320 km^{2})	The Hopewell Furnace was an iron plantation from 1771 to 1883, producing pig iron and cast iron products as a self-sufficient community. The blast furnace was fed by huge quantities charcoal made from the surrounding forests, though anthracite coal was briefly used for smelting instead. A restored water wheel continues to pump air for the furnace. Community buildings include the Ironmaster's Mansion, office, barn, church, and workers' quarters.
Hubbell Trading Post		Arizona	160.09 acres (0.6479 km^{2})	Following the Long Walk of the Navajo, many Navajo returned to the Ganado region of Arizona to restart their lives. Finding their homes and crops devastated, trade became an important means of economic growth for the Navajo. Established in 1878, J. Lorenzo Hubbell's trading post in Ganado, Arizona, serves as the oldest operating trading post on the Navajo Nation.
James A. Garfield		Ohio	7.82 acres (0.0316 km^{2})	20th President of the United States James A. Garfield was assassinated less than a year into his term, yet lived an accomplished life as an attorney, member of the Ohio State Senate, and United States Representative. The site preserves Garfield's home from 1876 until his death, as well as his presidential library, as he was the first president to have one.
Jamestown (affiliated area)		Virginia	20.63 acres (0.0835 km^{2})	James Fort was established on Jamestown Island in 1607 as the first permanent English settlement in North America. The fort eventually evolved into the town of Jamestown, Virginia (also spelled Jamestowne). The site is owned and operated by the National Park Service and Preservation Virginia, also serving as a unit of Colonial National Historical Park.
John Fitzgerald Kennedy		Massachusetts	0.09 acres (0.00036 km^{2})	John F. Kennedy was a part of the Kennedy political family and served as the 35th President of the United States. Purchased in 1914, John and his sisters Rosemary and Kathleen were the only Kennedys born in the house, as the Kennedy family moved in 1920. Rose Kennedy purchased the property again in 1966 to restore it to its 1914 appearance, donating it to the National Park Service the following year.
John Muir		California	344.14 acres (1.3927 km^{2})	John Muir, an early advocate for the preservation of wilderness in the United States and the "Father of the National Parks", lived in this house from 1897 until his death in 1914. While here, Muir co-founded the Sierra Club and served as its first president. He also wrote hundreds of magazine and newspaper articles, essays, and books advocating for the preservation of American wilderness, such as preventing Yosemite National Park's Hetch Hetchy Valley from being dammed. Though he died before its founding, Muir is often credited as a major figure in the development of the National Park Service.
Kate Mullany (affiliated area)		New York		Kate Mullany, leader of the Collar Laundry Union in Troy, New York, lived and worked in this house as she organized local women's labor movements. Mullany's union was one of the first women's unions that lasted longer than the resolution of a specific issue.
Knife River Indian Villages		North Dakota	1,751.00 acres (7.0860 km^{2})	Preserves the historic and archaeological remnants of bands of Hidatsa, Northern Plains Indians, in Stanton, North Dakota. Knife River was a major trading and agricultural area and the area was home to the villages of Awatixa Xi'e, Awatixa, and Big Hidatsa Village.
Lincoln Home		Illinois	12.24 acres (0.0495 km^{2})	Abraham Lincoln, 16th President of the United States, lived in this house from 1844 to 1861 while practicing law and serving in the United States House of Representatives. Lincoln also lived in this house when he was elected president in 1860. In addition to Lincoln's house, several other structures within the four-block area are also preserved and have been restored to their appearance during the time Lincoln lived in the neighborhood.
Little Rock Central High School		Arkansas	28.22 acres (0.1142 km^{2})	When opened in 1927, Little Rock Central was the nation's largest and most expensive high school facility. In 1957, the school gained international attention during the Little Rock Integration Crisis, when nine African-American students were denied entry to the school by students, protestors, and the state's governor. As this was in defiance to the recent ruling of Brown v. Board of Education, President Dwight D. Eisenhower deployed the 101st Airborne Division and the Arkansas National Guard to escort the students to school and deter protestors. The school itself is not open to the public as part of the site, but nearby visitor centers tell the school's history and provides streetscape walking tours with park rangers.
Longfellow House–Washington's Headquarters		Massachusetts	1.98 acres (0.0080 km^{2})	During the Siege of Boston, General (and later President of the United States) George Washington used this house as his headquarters and base of operations. Washington was based in the house for less than a year between 1775 and 1776; the house was later owned by popular fireside poet Henry Wadsworth Longfellow. The Longfellow family owned the house 1843 to 1972.
Lower East Side Tenement (affiliated area)		New York	0.0925 acres (0.000374 km^{2})	Built in 1863, the site is estimated to have housed 15,000 people from over 20 nations between 1863 and 2011. New York City was an epicenter for European immigration in the 19th and 20th centuries, with many immigrants arriving via Ellis Island to live in tenement houses similar to this one. The site promotes tolerance and historical perspective on the immigrant experience.
Maggie L. Walker		Virginia	1.29 acres (0.0052 km^{2})	Maggie L. Walker was an African-American businesswoman who chartered the St. Luke Penny Savings Bank in Richmond, Virginia, making her both the first African-American woman to charter a bank and the first African-American woman to serve as a bank president. Later in life, Walker was bound to a wheelchair as a result of paralysis, also serving as an icon for people with disabilities. Walker lived in this house from 1904 until her death in 1934. The house also contains a preserved elevator, rare for private residences at the time, which Walker used to access the second floor after her paralysis.
Manzanar		California	813.81 acres (3.2934 km^{2})	Manzanar was one of ten concentration camps used to imprison Japanese-Americans during World War II following Executive Order 9066. Though one of the smaller camps, more than 120,000 Japanese Americans were incarcerated at the site, with over 10,000 inmates at its peak. The site preserves and interprets the legacy of Japanese-American incarceration in the United States, as it was identified by the National Park Service as the best-preserved of the ten former camp sites.
Martin Van Buren		New York	284.93 acres (1.1531 km^{2})	Martin Van Buren, the 8th President of the United States, purchased this house during his presidency in 1839 and lived here until his death in 1862. The property, called Lindenwald, served as the headquarters for Van Buren's unsuccessful 1844 and 1848 campaigns for a second-term as president. Located only a mile away from Van Buren's birthplace in Kinderhook, New York, the house was also owned by local author Washington Irving, who Van Buren later befriended.
Mary McLeod Bethune Council House		Washington, D.C.	0.07356 acres (0.0002977 km^{2})	Mary McLeod Bethune was an important civil rights activist who Franklin D. Roosevelt appointed to his executive council to help create the Black Cabinet. The National Council of Negro Women, founded by Bethune, also occupied the house from its founding in 1935 until 1981. The house highlights the accomplishments of the organization and Bethune's lifelong work to advance the lives of African-Americans.
Minidoka		Idaho	396.30 acres (1.6038 km^{2})	The Minidoka War Relocation Center was the first of ten camps where Japanese Americans were imprisoned during World War II. More than 13,000 incarcerees stayed here at hastily built barracks in the high desert, working on camp construction, at its farm, or on the Anderson Ranch Dam. The Bainbridge Island Japanese American Exclusion Memorial, commemorating where 276 residents were removed from their homes, is a unit of Minidoka NHS.
Minuteman Missile		South Dakota	43.80 acres (0.1773 km^{2})	During the Cold War, the United States established several missile-building sites in remote parts of the country, including this site near Wall, South Dakota, which the 66th Strategic Missile Squadron of the 44th Strategic Missile Wing operated. The facilities represent the only remaining intact components of a nuclear missile field that once consisted of 150 Minuteman II missiles and 15 launch-control centers which covered over 13,500 square miles of southwestern South Dakota.
New Philadelphia		Illinois	124.33 acres (0.5031 km^{2})	Founded in 1836, New Philadelphia was the first town in the United States platted and registered by an African-American before the American Civil War. The founder, Free Frank McWorter, was a former slave who was able to save money from work and his own business to purchase the freedom of his wife, then himself, and over time, 13 members of his family from Kentucky. Several of his freedom purchases were funded by the sale of New Philadelphia town lots. The town no longer exists, having been abandoned between the 1880s and 1920s.
Nicodemus		Kansas	4.39 acres (0.0178 km^{2})	The town of Nicodemus, Kansas, was founded in 1877, and serves as the only remaining western town established by African-Americans during the Reconstruction Period following the American Civil War. The site contains several preserved buildings from the town's early history and illustrates westward expansion by African-Americans in post-war America.
Ninety Six		South Carolina	1,021.94 acres (4.1356 km^{2})	Old Ninety Six and Star Fort, so named for being 96 miles from the Cherokee town of Keowee (though it is actually 78 miles away), as well as the town of Ninety Six, South Carolina, were strategic forts for both the Cherokee people and soldiers during the American Revolutionary War. The town of Ninety Six was a Loyalist stronghold during the Revolutionary War, and from May 22 to June 18, 1781, newly appointed Southern Department commander of the Continental Army, Major General Nathanael Greene led 1,000 troops in an unsuccessful siege against the 550 Loyalists defending the fort in the village.
Pennsylvania Avenue		Washington, D.C.	17.61 acres (0.0713 km^{2})	The neighborhood around Pennsylvania Avenue between the White House and the United States Capitol has many historically and architecturally significant buildings and sites, including the Old Post Office, Freedom Plaza, United States Navy Memorial, National World War I Memorial, Federal Triangle, John Marshall Park, and Judiciary Square.
President William Jefferson Clinton Birthplace Home		Arkansas	0.68 acres (0.0028 km^{2})	William J. Clinton was the 42nd President of the United States. He was born in the town of Hope, Arkansas, and lived the first four years of his life in this house. While he lived there, the house was actually owed by Clinton's grandparents, who looked after him while his mother was working in New Orleans. As of 2023, Clinton is the most recently elected president to have an established National Park in their honor.
Puʻukoholā Heiau		Hawaii	86.24 acres (0.3490 km^{2})	This stone temple was built by Kamehameha the Great in 1791 following a prophecy that would allow him to conquer all of the Hawaiian islands. At this site his cousin Keōua was slain, ending the civil war on Hawaiʻi. John Young governed the island from its first European-style house nearby while Kamehameha unified Hawaii.
Sagamore Hill		New York	83.02 acres (0.3360 km^{2})	Theodore Roosevelt, the 26th President of the United States, lived in this house from 1885 until his death in 1919. Roosevelt spent many summers around Oyster Bay as a child, but only properly owned property on there with the completion of this house. His "Summer White House", he hired the New York architectural firm of Lamb & Rich to design a shingle-style, Queen Anne home for the property. While living at Sagamore Hill, Roosevelt helped facilitate the end of the Russo-Japanese War and hosted several foreign dignitaries while serving as president.
Saint Paul's Church		New York	6.13 acres (0.0248 km^{2})	Established in 1665, Saint Paul's Church is one of New York's oldest parishes. The church was the site of the infamous John Peter Zenger Trial of 1733, which set an early precedent for Freedom of Press in the United States, and served as a military hospital after the American Revolutionary War Battle of Pell's Point in 1776. The site was authorized in 1978 to protect Saint Paul's Church from increasing industrialization of the surrounding area of the Bronx and Mount Vernon, New York.
San Juan		Puerto Rico	75.13 acres (0.3040 km^{2})	Located in the Old San Juan section of San Juan, Puerto Rico, the park contains Castillo San Felipe del Morro, an important fortress during Puerto Rico's colonial period. The fort has been occupied by several generations of soldiers, and the site highlights the lives and conflicts of those stationed there. The site is also a World Heritage Site.
Sand Creek Massacre		Colorado	12,583.34 acres (50.9230 km^{2})	On November 29, 1864, the United States Army's 3rd Colorado Cavalry murdered an estimated 150 Cheyenne and Arapaho people during the American Indian Wars in what became known as the Sand Creek Massacre. While visitors can learn about the massacre, the Colorado War, and view the battlefield from a distance, the massacre site itself is off-limits to visitors.
Saugus Iron Works		Massachusetts	8.51 acres (0.0344 km^{2})	Saugus, Massachusetts, was home to the first integrated ironworks in North America due to John Winthrop the Younger establishing the ironworks sometime in the 1640s. Since iron goods were often imported to the colonies, Winthrop believed he could profit from producing iron goods in New England, since he had an abundance of raw materials and access to the New England and Chesapeake Colonies. A string of financial difficulties and mismanagement led to the ironworks closing in 1670.
Springfield Armory		Massachusetts	54.93 acres (0.2223 km^{2})	Formally known as the United States Armory and Arsenal at Springfield, this was the primary center for the manufacture of United States military firearms from 1777 until its closing in 1968. The armory's innovative use of Interchangeable parts and the assembly line process would prove essential to manufacturing firearms for conflicts like the Spanish-American War, American Civil War, and World War I. The armory was also the site of Shays' Rebellion in the 1780s.
Steamtown		Pennsylvania	62.48 acres (0.2528 km^{2})	The Scranton yards of the Delaware, Lackawanna and Western Railroad in Scranton, Pennsylvania, were built between 1899 and 1902, with a working turntable and a roundhouse added sometime in the 1930s. The current site is mostly recreations of these structures used to house F. Nelson Blount's donated collection of steam engines and railroad cars. The site also illustrates the history of Scranton's Dickson Manufacturing Company, a railway steam locomotive manufacturer.
Theodore Roosevelt Birthplace		New York	0.11 acres (0.00045 km^{2})	Theodore Roosevelt, the 25th President of the United States, was born in New York City in 1858. He and his family lived in a brownstone in Manhattan until 1872. The Roosevelt's house was demolished in 1916, but the site was purchased in 1919 by the Theodore Roosevelt Association, who hired Theodate Pope Riddle to rebuild the house as a replica of how it appeared in 1865. The house was opened as a museum and eventually donated to the Park Service.
Theodore Roosevelt Inaugural		New York	1.18 acres (0.0048 km^{2})	Following the assassination of William McKinley in Buffalo, New York, Vice President Theodore Roosevelt assumed office. At the time of McKinley's assassination, Roosevelt was in Vermont. He traveled to Buffalo to visit McKinley, who was still alive, and left afterwards to visit the Adirondack Mountains. While there, McKinley died, and Roosevelt returned to Buffalo to take the Oath of Office at the house of scholar Ansley Wilcox. In modern times, the site preserves not only the room of Roosevelt's swearing in, but also artifacts related to the Pan-American Expo, where McKinley was shot.
Thomas Cole (affiliated area)		New York	3.5 acres (0.014 km^{2})	Painter Thomas Cole, the founder of the Hudson River School, lived and painted at this house, which he called Cedar Grove, from 1833 until his death in 1848. Widely regarded as the first significant American landscape painter, Cole had a tremendous influence on American art and romanticism. While at Cedar Grove, Cole painted many pieces of the Catskill Mountains, as well as his famous series The Voyage of Life.
Thomas Stone		Maryland	328.25 acres (1.3284 km^{2})	Thomas Stone, member of the Maryland Senate and signer of the Declaration of Independence, lived in this house from 1770 until his death in 1787. Stone was buried on the property, as was most of his family. The Stone family owned the home, which was known as both the Thomas Stone House and Haberdeventure, until 1938. The Stones were active in Maryland politics for generations, with Stone's brothers Michael Jenifer Stone and John Hoskins Stone serving in Maryland's state government and Stone's grandson Frederick Stone representing Maryland's fifth district in the United States House of Representatives.
Touro Synagogue (affiliated area)		Rhode Island	0.23 acres (0.00093 km^{2})	Completed in 1763, the Touro Synagogue, also known as the Congregation Jeshuat Israel, is the oldest Jewish synagogue in the United States and the only one dated to the Colonial Era. Sephardic Jews from the West Indies were the first to occupy the synagogue, with Ashkenazi Jews and Orthodox Jews occupying it from the late 19th century onwards. The site is still an active synagogue.
Tuskegee Airmen		Alabama	89.68 acres (0.3629 km^{2})	The 332d Fighter Group and the 477th Bombardment Group (Medium) of the United States Army Air Forces during World War II were an all-black group of service members also known as the Tuskegee Airmen, so named for being educated at Alabama's Tuskegee University. The site preserves Moton Field, the site of primary flight training for the airmen, and illustrates the airmen's accomplishments and role in desegregating the military.
Tuskegee Institute		Alabama	57.92 acres (0.2344 km^{2})	Founded in 1881, Tuskegee Institute is a private, historically black land-grant university which is still active. That year, author Booker T. Washington was hired as a teacher (and eventually principal) at the school and helped expand the university's size and areas of study to lay the groundwork for its prominence in black education. The institute has played many significant roles in African-American history, including the site of the Tuskegee Syphilis Study and the educating of the Tuskegee Airmen. Notable alumni include George Washington Carver (who is buried on the campus grounds), Ralph Ellison, and Lionel Richie.
Ulysses S. Grant		Missouri	9.60 acres (0.0388 km^{2})	Ulysses S. Grant, 16th President of the United States and Commanding General of the Union Army during the American Civil War, lived on this site from 1854 to 1859. The house, called White Haven, was owned by the family of Grant's wife, Julia Dent, and she remained here with the Grants' children while Grant was stationed elsewhere as part of his military service. Grant managed the site's farms and grounds for his father-in-law, including the use of slaves, though Grant, born to a strict abolitionist, was uncomfortable with the practice.
Vanderbilt Mansion		New York	211.65 acres (0.8565 km^{2})	New York Central Railroad director Frederick William Vanderbilt and other members of the Vanderbilt family lived in this house from 1899 until its acquisition by the National Park Service in 1940. Known as Hyde Park, the building is one of the oldest Hudson River estates and was located near the New York Central Railroad, providing Vanderbilt easy access to New York City on his own line. The 54-room mansion is the work of the architectural firm McKim, Mead & White.
Washita Battlefield		Oklahoma	315.20 acres (1.2756 km^{2})	On November 27, 1868, the Battle of Washita River occurred at the Southern Cheyenne village of Chief Black Kettle. As part of the Comanche campaign, Lt. Col. George Custer led the 7th U.S. Cavalry to attack the village in the early morning hours, resulting in a large number of Cheyenne casualties. The historic site includes one of the largest and best-preserved tracts, including the village of the Cheyenne, which was the focal point of the battle
Whitman Mission		Washington	138.53 acres (0.5606 km^{2})	In 1836, a small group of Presbyterian missionaries traveled with the annual fur trapper's caravan into Oregon Country on the Oregon Trail. Among the group were Marcus Whitman and his wife Narcissa Whitman. The Whitmans established the Whitman Mission west of Walla Walla, Washington, but were murdered alongside eleven others by Cayuse people in the 1847 Whitman massacre. The massacre was an important part of Pacific Northwest history, as it caused the United States Congress to take action in declaring territorial status to the Oregon Country to protect immigrant settlers.
William Howard Taft		Ohio	3.64 acres (0.0147 km^{2})	William Howard Taft, the 27th President of the United States and 10th Chief Justice of the Supreme Court was born in this house in 1857 and lived here until leaving to attend Yale University in 1874. Taft's entire family lived in the house, including his six siblings. The Taft political dynasty began at the house with Taft's father, Alphonso Taft, an important diplomat and 34th Attorney General; Alphonso Taft hosted many important political leaders and dignitaries at the house.

=== National Historic Area ===
There is one National Historic Area in the US park system, a unique designation given to the Aleutian World War II National Historic Area.

Name	Image	Location	Area	Description
Aleutian World War (affiliated area)		Alaska		Preserves the site of Fort Schwatka on Mount Ballyhoo, one of four coastal defense posts built to protect Dutch Harbor and the highest coastal battery ever constructed in the United States. Several collapsed barracks, gun mounts, and lookouts remain.

=== International Historic Site ===
There is one International Historic Site in the US park system, a unique designation given to Saint Croix Island, Maine, on the New Brunswick border. The title, given to the site of the first permanent French settlement in America, recognizes the influence that it has had on both Canada and the United States. The preservation and management policies of the NPS do not distinguish between these designations.

Name	Image	Location	Area	Description
Saint Croix Island		Maine	6.5 acres (0.026 km^{2})	Saint Croix Island was the site of an early attempt at French colonization by Pierre Dugua, Sieur de Mons in 1604. Nearly half the expedition's men died that winter before they moved to Nova Scotia and founded Acadia. Sited near the mouth of the Saint Croix River, both the NPS and Parks Canada have interpretive sites on the respective mainlands.

=== Authorized Historic Sites ===
The following site is not yet owned or formally developed by the National Park Service, but may eventually be owned and established as a national historic site.

Name	Image	Location	Description
Ronald Reagan Boyhood Home		Illinois	Pending acquisition of property; on February 6, 2002, (Public Law 107-137), the United States Secretary of the Interior was authorized to purchase the property from the Reagan Home Preservation and Restoration Committee (the then-owners) and establish a National Historic Site under the jurisdiction of the National Park Service. The committee instead sold the property to Young America's Foundation, who currently owns and operates the site.

== National Historical Parks ==
National historical parks tend to be larger and more complex than national historic sites. In the United States, sites are "historic", while parks are "historical". The NPS explains that a site can be intrinsically historic, while a park is a modern legal invention. As such, a park is not itself "historic", but can be called "historical" when it contains historic resources. It is the resources which are historic, not the park. There are 64 national historical parks.

National Historical Parks
Name	Image	Location	Area	Description
Abraham Lincoln Birthplace		Kentucky	344.50 acres (1.3941 km^{2})	President Abraham Lincoln was born in 1809 in a one-room log cabin, which was reconstructed in a neoclassical memorial building. He lived until age seven on another farm nearby before moving to Indiana.
Adams		Massachusetts	23.82 acres (0.0964 km^{2})	The eleven buildings at this farm were home to United States presidents John Adams and John Quincy Adams and several generations of their family. They include the John Adams Birthplace and John Quincy Adams Birthplace, the Stone Library, Peacefield mansion, and United First Parish Church, where they are buried.
Appomattox Court House		Virginia	1,774.60 acres (7.1816 km^{2})	The end of the Civil War was initiated on April 9, 1865, with the Union victory at the Battle of Appomattox Court House, after which Confederate General Robert E. Lee surrendered to Union General Ulysses S. Grant at the McLean House. Several hiking trails lead to historic cabins and other marked sites.
Blackstone River Valley		Rhode Island, Massachusetts	1,489.00 acres (6.0258 km^{2})	Some of the earliest textile mills in America were built in the Blackstone Valley, developing the area into an industrial leader with several company towns connected by the Blackstone Canal. Five historic districts include preserved mill complexes.
Boston		Massachusetts	43.82 acres (0.1773 km^{2})	The Freedom Trail links several sites that made Boston important during the American Revolution. These include the Old State House, where the Boston Massacre took place; the Old North Church; the Old South Meeting House, where the Boston Tea Party was organized; Charlestown Navy Yard, home to the USS Constitution, and the 221 ft (67 m) Bunker Hill Monument at the site of the Battle of Bunker Hill.
Brown v. Board of Education		Kansas, South Carolina	1.85 acres (0.0075 km^{2})	Monroe Elementary School in Topeka was one of the city's four racially segregated schools for African American students. Brown v. Board of Education, a Supreme Court case brought by a parent at the school, held that "separate educational facilities are inherently unequal" and segregation was unconstitutional. The park was expanded in 2022 to include two schools in South Carolina involved in the Briggs v. Elliott case that was combined with Brown.
Cane River Creole		Louisiana	205.50 acres (0.8316 km^{2})	The Oakland and Magnolia Plantations represent the history of French Creole culture of Northern Louisiana. Generations of enslaved and tenant workers farmed cotton here, with 65 remaining buildings.
Cedar Creek and Belle Grove		Virginia	3,704.96 acres (14.9934 km^{2})	At the 1864 Battle of Cedar Creek, Union General Philip Sheridan's army fended off the last Confederate attempt to invade the North. The nearby Belle Grove Plantation served as Sheridan's headquarters and exhibits the history of farming and slavery in the Shenandoah Valley.
Chaco Culture		New Mexico	33,960.19 acres (137.4320 km^{2})	This canyon site was inhabited from the 9th to 12th centuries by the Ancestral Puebloans, who built the largest pre-colonial buildings in the US, including the great houses Pueblo Bonito and Chetro Ketl. Their architecture, archaeological artifacts, and petroglyphs, show the sophistication of this former economic center.
Chesapeake and Ohio Canal		District of Columbia, Maryland, West Virginia	19,617.37 acres (79.3887 km^{2})	The 184 mi (296 km) Chesapeake and Ohio Canal shipped coal and other cargo down the Potomac River from Cumberland, Maryland, to Georgetown, Washington, D.C., from 1831 to 1924. Its towpath, alongside many preserved locks, is now a hiking and cycling trail, with more strenuous trails at Great Falls. It is also part of Potomac Heritage National Scenic Trail.
Colonial		Virginia	8,675.04 acres (35.1066 km^{2})	Founded in 1607, Jamestown was the first permanent English settlement in North America and served as the colonial capital until 1699. Historic Jamestown preserves its archaeological ruins and is connected by the Colonial Parkway to the Yorktown Battlefield, where in 1781 George Washington's Continental Army defeated the British in the Siege of Yorktown, the last major battle of the Revolutionary War.
Cumberland Gap		Kentucky, Tennessee, Virginia	24,546.83 acres (99.3375 km^{2})	The Cumberland Gap of the Appalachian Mountains was a major passageway for Native Americans and later European settlers between the East Coast and the interior. Called the "first doorway of the west", the park includes the ridge of the Cumberland Mountains, the Gap Cave, and the Hensley Settlement.
Dayton Aviation Heritage		Ohio	110.56 acres (0.4474 km^{2})	Dayton, Ohio, was home to Orville and Wilbur Wright, who invented powered flight. This multi-site park includes their Wright Cycle Company shop, Huffman Prairie Flying Field, where they conducted test flights, the Wright Company airplane factory, Orville's home Hawthorn Hill, and the Wright Brothers Aviation Center, as well as the Paul Laurence Dunbar House, home of poet Paul Laurence Dunbar
First State		Delaware, Pennsylvania	1,409.22 acres (5.7029 km^{2})	Delaware was the first state to ratify the Constitution of the United States, and this park features several sites dating to the colonial era. These include New Castle Court House, the first capitol of the state; Fort Christina and the Old Swedes Church, site of the first Swedish colony in America; Dover Green; the John Dickinson House, the plantation owned by founding father John Dickinson; and Brandywine Valley nature reserve.
Fort Sumter and Fort Moultrie		South Carolina	232.52 acres (0.9410 km^{2})	In April 1861 the South Carolina militia bombarded Fort Sumter, build on an artificial island in Charleston Harbor, initiating the Civil War. During a second battle in 1863 Union forces largely destroyed the fort, which was later rebuilt. Nearby Fort Moultrie, first built in 1776, defended Charleston from the British in the Battle of Sullivan's Island, and its palmetto log construction is represented on the Flag of South Carolina.
George Rogers Clark		Indiana	26.17 acres (0.1059 km^{2})	George Rogers Clark sacked the British Fort Sackville on the Wabash River in 1779 during the Illinois campaign of the Revolutionary War. President Franklin D. Roosevelt dedicated a memorial to this victory in 1936. The circular domed Classical-style memorial has a bronze statue of Clark and seven murals depicting the events and their aftermath.
Golden Spike		Utah	2,735.28 acres (11.0693 km^{2})	The first transcontinental railroad was completed in 1869 when the Union Pacific Railroad from Iowa connected with the Central Pacific Railroad from California at Promontory Summit. Leland Stanford ceremoniously drove the golden spike to join the final rails. Replica Jupiter and No. 119 locomotives on rebuilt rails are used in reenactment events at the park. An auto tour and a hiking trail follow routes of tracklaying race of 1869.
Harpers Ferry		West Virginia, Virginia, Maryland	3,669.19 acres (14.8487 km^{2})	In 1859 abolitionist John Brown conducted a raid on the arsenal at Harpers Ferry, a prelude to the Civil War; he was executed and became a martyr. John Brown's Fort remains in the historic lower town in West Virginia. Hiking trails in all three states have overlooks of the confluence of the Potomac and Shenandoah rivers. The park also has the remains of Storer College, industrial ruins, and Civil War batteries.
Harriet Tubman		New York	31.50 acres (0.1275 km^{2})	Harriet Tubman, a leading abolitionist and conductor in the Underground Railroad, moved to Auburn, New York, in 1859, where she continued to shelter Blacks moving north. The park features her residence, the African Methodist Episcopal Zion Church she attended, and the Tubman Home for the Aged she founded for elderly African Americans.
Harriet Tubman Underground Railroad		Maryland	480.00 acres (1.9425 km^{2})	Harriet Tubman, after escaping slavery herself in 1849, guided 70 enslaved people from the Eastern Shore of Maryland to freedom during 13 trips. The fields, marshes, and woodlands of the park include the site of her childhood home, several farms sites she was forced to work at, the Harriet Tubman Underground Railroad Visitor Center, and a scenic byway.
Homestead		Nebraska	210.45 acres (0.8517 km^{2})	After passage of the Homestead Act of 1862, hundreds of thousands of families moved west to farm federally owned land, which they would receive after five years of cultivation. This site includes some of the first acres claimed. Over 10% of the country was homesteaded, allocating land of the Native Americans to settlers. The site includes a historic cabin and school, heritage center, and restored tallgrass prairie, which was largely eradicated by the settlers.
Hopewell Culture		Ohio	1,775.78 acres (7.1863 km^{2})	Peoples of the Hopewell culture lived in Ohio from about 200 BC to 500 AD. They built several large ceremonial earthworks in geometric shapes up to hundreds of feet wide. Archaeological findings revealed the society's beliefs, practices, and trade.
Independence		Pennsylvania	44.87 acres (0.1816 km^{2})	The Declaration of Independence was signed in 1776 and the Constitution was drafted in 1787 at Independence Hall, then the Pennsylvania capitol in Philadelphia. The Liberty Bell resides across the street, and other historic buildings include the First Bank of the United States, Carpenters' Hall, and Congress Hall.
Jean Lafitte		Louisiana	25,875.86 acres (104.7159 km^{2})	Designated a National Historical Park and Preserve, this site highlights several facets of Louisiana culture, history, and nature. The Chalmette Battlefield was the site of the Battle of New Orleans, the final event of the War of 1812. The Barataria Preserve offers hiking and canoeing though swamps and bayous home to alligators. Three cultural centers interpret Acadian and Cajun societies. A visitor center in the French Quarter illustrates the traditions of the Mississippi River Delta.
Jimmy Carter		Georgia	78.35 acres (0.3171 km^{2})	President Jimmy Carter spent much of his life in the small town of Plains, Georgia. Visitors can tour his boyhood home and farm, and the high school he and Rosalynn Carter attended is now the visitor center. Carter ran his 1976 presidential campaign out of the Plains Train Depot, built in 1888 and now a museum. The Carter compound within the park, which includes the Carter family home and burial site, is currently closed to visitors.
Kalaupapa		Hawaii	10,778.88 acres (43.6206 km^{2})	Kalaupapa National Historical Park is located in Kalaupapa, Hawaiʻi, on the island of Molokaʻi, with the goal of preserving the settings of two leper colonies that operated from 1866 to 1969 with 8500 residents during its operation.
Kaloko-Honokōhau		Hawaii	1,163.05 acres (4.7067 km^{2})	This coastal park includes two fishponds and a fish trap used in Ancient Hawaiian aquaculture and brackish anchialine pools with ‘ōpae‘ula shrimp. Lava flows lead down to the Ala Kahakai National Historic Trail, running along the beach and by ruins of an ancient heiau.
Keweenaw		Michigan	1,870.00 acres (7.5676 km^{2})	This park shows the life and history of the Keweenaw Peninsula in the Upper Peninsula of the U.S. state of Michigan. It is the site of the oldest and largest lava flow known on Earth, which produced the only known place where 97 percent pure native copper is found in large amounts. This natural resource supported unique populations, where both prehistoric aboriginal mining of copper and more recent mining settlements occurred.
Klondike Gold Rush		Alaska, Washington	12,996.49 acres (52.5949 km^{2})	After gold was found at the Klondike River in 1896, 100,000 prospectors journeyed to the Yukon for the Klondike Gold Rush, most taking a route through Skagway, Alaska, along the Chilkoot Trail, which can still be hiked today, or the White Pass Trail. The Seattle unit in Pioneer Square tells the city's history as a boomtown when prospectors passed through and bought their provisions.
Lewis and Clark		Oregon, Washington	3,410.15 acres (13.8004 km^{2})	After crossing the continent to the Pacific Ocean, members of the Corps of Discovery Expedition spent the winter of 1805–1806 at Fort Clatsop, which was reconstructed from William Clark's journals. Lewis and Clark documented the nature and geography around the mouth of the Columbia River, including at the affiliated Ecola and Cape Disappointment State Parks.
Lowell		Massachusetts	141.71 acres (0.5735 km^{2})	The city of Lowell, Massachusetts was at one time an important manufacturing center due to its proximity to the Merrimack River, Charles River, and Pawtucket Falls. Attempting to replicate England's mill communities, Lowell became one of the largest manufacturing hubs in the United States during the Industrial Revolution. The park now covers the history of Lowell's textile mills and the workers who worked and lived in the city.
Lyndon B. Johnson		Texas	1,571.71 acres (6.3605 km^{2})	President Lyndon B. Johnson spent much of his life here in the Hill Country, where visitors can tour his reconstructed birthplace, boyhood home, and ranch. The still-working ranch was Johnson's Little White House where he spent a fifth of his presidency working and hosting guests. It also has the plane used as Air Force One.
Manhattan Project		New Mexico, Tennessee, Washington	113.61 acres (0.4598 km^{2})	The Manhattan Project was a massive top secret project with the goal of producing an atomic weapon during World War II. Representing the multi-faceted nature of the project, the park consists of three units that were key to the development of the atomic bomb: Oak Ridge, Tennessee; Los Alamos, New Mexico; and Hanford, Washington.
Marsh-Billings-Rockefeller		Vermont	643.07 acres (2.6024 km^{2})	Early conservationist and author George Perkins Marsh was born in this house and lived in it for many years. Marsh was an early advocate of environmental conservation, and the park highlights his history of protecting the environment. The site also takes its name from influential lawyer Frederick H. Billings and businessman Laurance Rockefeller, both of whom also owned the main house on the property.
Martin Luther King Jr.		Georgia	39.17 acres (0.1585 km^{2})	Civil rights leader Martin Luther King Jr. was born in 1929 in a home in Sweet Auburn, Atlanta, and succeeded his father as pastor of the Ebenezer Baptist Church down the street. After his 1968 assassination, the King Center for Nonviolent Social Change, the site of his and his widow's tombs, was founded next door to the church. The historic district also includes the Fire Station No. 6 and period shotgun houses.
Minute Man		Massachusetts	1,027.76 acres (4.1592 km^{2})	The American Revolutionary War began at the Old North Bridge in Concord, Massachusetts; colonial commanders ordered militia men to fire back at British troops for the first time at the bridge following the "shot heard round the world" earlier in the day in the neighboring town of Lexington. The park encompasses many sites in Concord and Lexington related to the start of the revolution, as well as The Wayside, the home of several authors including Louisa May Alcott and Nathaniel Hawthorne.
Morristown		New Jersey	1,710.72 acres (6.9230 km^{2})	The Ford Mansion in Morristown, New Jersey was General George Washington's Headquarters during the winter of 1779–1780, while the Continental Army was encamped at Jockey Hollow.
Natchez		Mississippi	119.75 acres (0.4846 km^{2})	Natchez National Historical Park commemorates the history of Natchez, Mississippi, and consists of four separate sites. Fort Rosalie is the 18th century site built by the French. It was later renamed Fort Panmure and controlled by Great Britain, Spain, and the United States. Forks of the Road marks what was the second-busiest slave trading market in the Deep South between 1832 and 1863. The other two sites, Melrose and the William Johnson House, contain furnishings related to life in antebellum Natchez and other exhibits.
New Bedford Whaling		Massachusetts	34.00 acres (0.1376 km^{2})	During the first half of the 19th century, New Bedford, Massachusetts, was one of the world's most important whaling ports; at its economic height, New Bedford was the wealthiest city in North America per capita. The park is a historic district administered under a partnership between the National Park Service, the City of New Bedford and private building owners to preserve the historic landscapes, structures, and collections and promote research and educational programming associated with the history of whaling.
New Orleans Jazz		Louisiana	5.13 acres (0.0208 km^{2})	Jazz music originated in New Orleans's diverse culture of Creoles, Afro-Caribbeans, African Americans, and European Americans. Brass bands, often led by charismatic bandleaders, played at community events and evolved ragtime and dance tunes with improvisation. Perseverance Hall in Louis Armstrong Park was a major social club for mixed-race dance events featuring early jazz.
Nez Perce		Idaho, Montana, Oregon, Washington	4,564.93 acres (18.4736 km^{2})	The park preserves the traditional aboriginal lands of the Nez Perce people, specifically those related to the Nez Perce War, an 1877 conflict where Chief Joseph attempted to lead the Nez Perce to freedom in Canada, but were attacked by the U.S. Army Cavalry. The park is composed of 38 discontiguous sites which span three main ecoregions, covering a wide range of elevations and climates in the northwestern United States.
Ocmulgee Mounds		Georgia	3,401.92 acres (13.7671 km^{2})	People of the Mississippian culture built several large earthworks along the Ocmulgee River around 900–1100 AD, including ceremonial temples, platform mounds, and earth lodges. In the 1930s, the largest archaeological dig in U.S. history excavated millions of artifacts dating to more than 14,000 years ago. The park also has trails through forests and wetlands rich with wildlife.
Palo Alto Battlefield		Texas	3,426.87 acres (13.8681 km^{2})	The Battle of Palo Alto was fought on May 8, 1846, as the first major conflict of the Mexican–American War. After Mexican troops under General Mariano Arista marched on Fort Texas, American General Zachary Taylor's infantry forced them to retreat with an efficient artillery attack.
Paterson Great Falls		New Jersey	51.33 acres (0.2077 km^{2})	As one of the largest waterfalls on the East Coast, the Great Falls of the Passaic River contributed to Paterson's founding in 1792 by Alexander Hamilton as an industrial city. The falls were harnessed to power cotton mills, locomotive factories, silk mills, and other manufacturing facilities, but the city declined in the 20th century.
Pecos		New Mexico	6,693.49 acres (27.0876 km^{2})	The Pueblo people lived in New Mexico as early as 1000 AD and have had an enormous impact on the culture and development of the state. Pecos Pueblo, also known as Cicuye Pueblo, a Native American community established in the Pueblo II Period, is preserved at the park. The park also encompasses thousands of acres of landscape infused with historical elements from prehistoric archaeological ruins to 19th century ranches and the Glorieta Pass Battlefield.
Pullman		Illinois; 41.691°N 87.610°W	0.4 acres (0.002 km^{2})	This district of Chicago was the first planned industrial community in the United States, built as a company town for the Pullman Company that manufactured railroad cars. The community was opened in the early 1880s and by 1883 had reached a population of 8,000 people, but the community was annexed by Chicago in 1889 after failing to meet expectations. This, in part, led to the American Railway Union forming and boycotting Pullman in the 1894 Pullman Strike over unfair wages and shaping the course of American labor policy. The park also highlights the accomplishments of the Brotherhood of Sleeping Car Porters, who successfully negotiated unionization for African-Americans with Pullman.
Puʻuhonua o Hōnaunau		Hawaii	419.80 acres (1.6989 km^{2})	This "place of refuge" provided protection to defeated warriors and those who broke the kapu, or sacred laws of ancient Hawaiʻi. A long masonry wall separates the ceremonial site from the Royal Grounds, which includes the reconstructed Hale o Keawe, a heiau that was a mausoleum for local aliʻi, or high chiefs. The Ala Kahakai National Historic Trail passes through the park, alongside cliffs and volcanic tide pools.
Reconstruction Era		South Carolina	64.99 acres (0.2630 km^{2})	The Reconstruction era was a period in American history following the American Civil War and lasting until approximately the Compromise of 1877. During Reconstruction, attempts were made to rebuild the country after the bloody Civil War, bring the former Confederate states back into the United States, and to counteract the political, social, and economic legacies of slavery. The park includes several buildings related to the lives of emancipated slaves in Beaufort, South Carolina, as Beaufort was one of the first places in the United States where they "voted, bought property and created churches, schools and businesses."
Rosie the Riveter World War II Home Front		California	145.19 acres (0.5876 km^{2})	The park preserves and interprets the legacy of the United States home front during World War II, including the Kaiser Richmond Shipyards, the Victory ship SS Red Oak Victory, a tank factory, and other facilities built to support America's entry into World War II. The park focuses on the roles of women and African-Americans in the war effort, and is named for Rosie the Riveter, a cultural icon representing the women who worked in factories and shipyards during the war.
Saint-Gaudens		New Hampshire	190.75 acres (0.7719 km^{2})	Irish sculptor Augustus Saint-Gaudens lived in this summer residence from 1885 to 1897, with the house becoming his permanent home from 1900 until his death in 1907. While here, Saint-Gaudens sculpted some of his most notable works, including the Robert Gould Shaw Memorial and Diana. Saint-Gaudens's influence in the art world attracted many artists to Cornish, New Hampshire, with his house serving as the center of the Cornish Art Colony.
Salem Maritime		Massachusetts	9.02 acres (0.0365 km^{2})	Salem, Massachusetts was one of the most significant seaports trading commodities in early American history. Before the American Revolution, the town benefitted greatly from the Triangle Trade; during the American Revolutionary War, Salem was an important port for privateers. After the war, Salem became a hub for Far East trading. The park contains several buildings and the Friendship of Salem, all of which preserve and interpret the maritime history of New England and the United States.
Ste. Genevieve		Missouri	16.91 acres (0.0684 km^{2})	The city of Ste. Genevieve, Missouri was the first organized European settlement west of the Mississippi River. The city was founded in 1735 by French Canadian colonists and settlers from east of the river. Notably, the city is home to a National Historic Landmark District which showcases a high concentration of Poteaux-sur-sol and Poteaux en terre buildings, exemplifying rare examples of well-preserved colonial-era French architecture.
Salt River Bay		U.S. Virgin Islands	989.42 acres (4.0040 km^{2})	Located on the island of St. Croix, the park contains the only known site where members of the Columbus expedition set foot on what is now United States territory. The park also preserves upland watersheds, mangrove forests, and estuarine and marine environments that support threatened and endangered species.
San Antonio Missions		Texas	947.77 acres (3.8355 km^{2})	The Spanish established several missions along the San Antonio River in the 17th and 18th centuries to colonize Texas and convert the Indigenous Americans. Mission Concepcion, Mission San José, Mission San Juan Capistrano, and Mission San Francisco de la Espada feature enclosed layouts with decorative elements representing Spanish and Coahuiltecan indigenous motifs. The park is a World Heritage Site.
San Francisco Maritime		California	49.86 acres (0.2018 km^{2})	This maritime museum has a collection of historic vessels built from the 1880s to 1910s including the steam ferry Eureka, the world's largest wooden ship; the square rig sailing ship Balclutha; schooners; and tugboats.
San Juan Island		Washington	2,145.56 acres (8.6828 km^{2})	With the U.S. and Great Britain engaged in a boundary dispute over the San Juan Islands, the killing of a pig in 1859 led both sides to form military camps on opposite ends of San Juan Island. The bloodless Pig War ended 13 years later when the U.S. was decided the owner of the islands. Both the American and English camps have surviving buildings, developed trails, and shoreline.
Saratoga		New York	3,579.14 acres (14.4843 km^{2})	The Battles of Saratoga were fought on September 19 and October 7, 1777, as part of the American Revolutionary War. The climax of the Saratoga Campaign, it was a decisive victory for the Americans over Britain and prevented Britain from gaining control of the strategic Hudson River Valley. The park includes the site of surrender between British Army General John Burgoyne and American Army General Horatio Gates.
Sitka		Alaska	116.29 acres (0.4706 km^{2})	The 1804 Battle of Sitka took place between Russian fur-trappers and the Tlingit people and resulted in Sitka later becoming the capital of Russian America. The Russian Bishop's House, a log structure from the 1840s, was the seat of the Russian Orthodox Church's proselytism efforts. The park also has a collection of totem poles.
Thomas Edison		New Jersey	21.25 acres (0.0860 km^{2})	Inventor and industrialist Thomas Edison moved to the Glenmont mansion in 1886 and opened his nearby laboratory complex the next year. His company developed phonographs, batteries, movie cameras, and numerous other products in over 40 years in operation in West Orange. The park has several early cars from Edison's collection and a reproduction of the Black Maria, the first movie studio.
Tumacácori		Arizona	360.32 acres (1.4582 km^{2})	The park protects the ruins of three Spanish Jesuit mission communities: Mission San Cayetano de Tumacácori (at Tumacácori) and Mission Los Santos Ángeles de Guevavi (1691, the two oldest missions in southern Arizona) and Mission San Cayetano de Calabazas (1756).
Valley Forge		Pennsylvania	3,468.54 acres (14.0367 km^{2})	The Continental Army was encamped at Valley Forge during the winter and spring of 1777–1778, where they were led by General George Washington and trained by Baron von Steuben in preparation for the Revolutionary War. The site is preserved with Washington's Headquarters, reconstructed cabins displaying soldiers' hardship, and the 1917 National Memorial Arch.
War in the Pacific		Guam	2,030.65 acres (8.2177 km^{2})	This park commemorates the bravery and sacrifice of those who participated in the Pacific Theater of World War II. Park units include the Asan and Agat Invasion Beaches where U.S. troops landed in 1944 after Japanese occupation, the Piti Guns and other Japanese defensive sites, and memorials.
Weir Farm		Connecticut	74.20 acres (0.3003 km^{2})	J. Alden Weir was an impressionist painter and founding member of "The Ten" who lived and worked in this house and studio from 1882 until his death in 1919. The park also commemorates the lives of artists such as John Singer Sargent, Albert Pinkham Ryder, and several other notable artists who stayed with the Weirs family throughout their lives.
Women's Rights		New York	7.44 acres (0.0301 km^{2})	In 1848, the Seneca Falls Convention was held in Seneca Falls, New York. The convention was America's first women's rights convention, and suffrage advocates such as Elizabeth Cady Stanton, Lucretia Mott, and Frederick Douglass were in attendance. The Declaration of Sentiments was drafted and signed at the convention. The park preserves several sites associated with the convention, including the houses of Stanton and McClintock.

=== International Historical Park ===
Klondike Gold Rush International Historical Park was formally established by the United States and Canada in 1998, the year of the centennial of the gold rush the park commemorates. The park comprises Klondike Gold Rush National Historical Park in Washington and Alaska (above) and Chilkoot Trail National Historic Site in British Columbia. Tens of thousands of prospectors took this trail in hopes of making their fortunes in the Klondike River district of Yukon.

== See also ==
- National Historic Sites (Canada)
- List of World Heritage Sites in the United States
- List of areas in the United States National Park System
- List of national monuments of the United States
- List of national memorials of the United States
