= Women in labor unions =

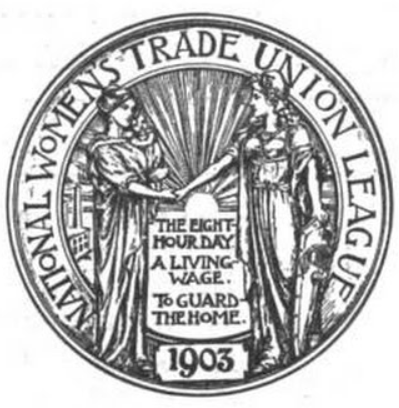
Women's Trade Union League (WTUL) emblem from magazine publication in 1916

Women in labor unions have participated in labor organizing and activity throughout United States history. These workers have organized to address issues within the workplace, such as promoting gender equality, better working conditions, and higher wages. Women have participated in unions including the Collar Laundry Union, the WTUL, the IWW, the ILGWU, and the UAW.

== United States ==
=== Early union activity ===
==== 1860s ====
The Collar Laundry Union was formed in 1864 in Troy, New York by Kate Mullany. It was the first entirely female labor union in the United States.

==== 1890s ====
For five months, Mary Kenney O'Sullivan was appointed as a part-time organizer of the American Federation of Labor in 1892.

=== The Women's Trade Union League ===
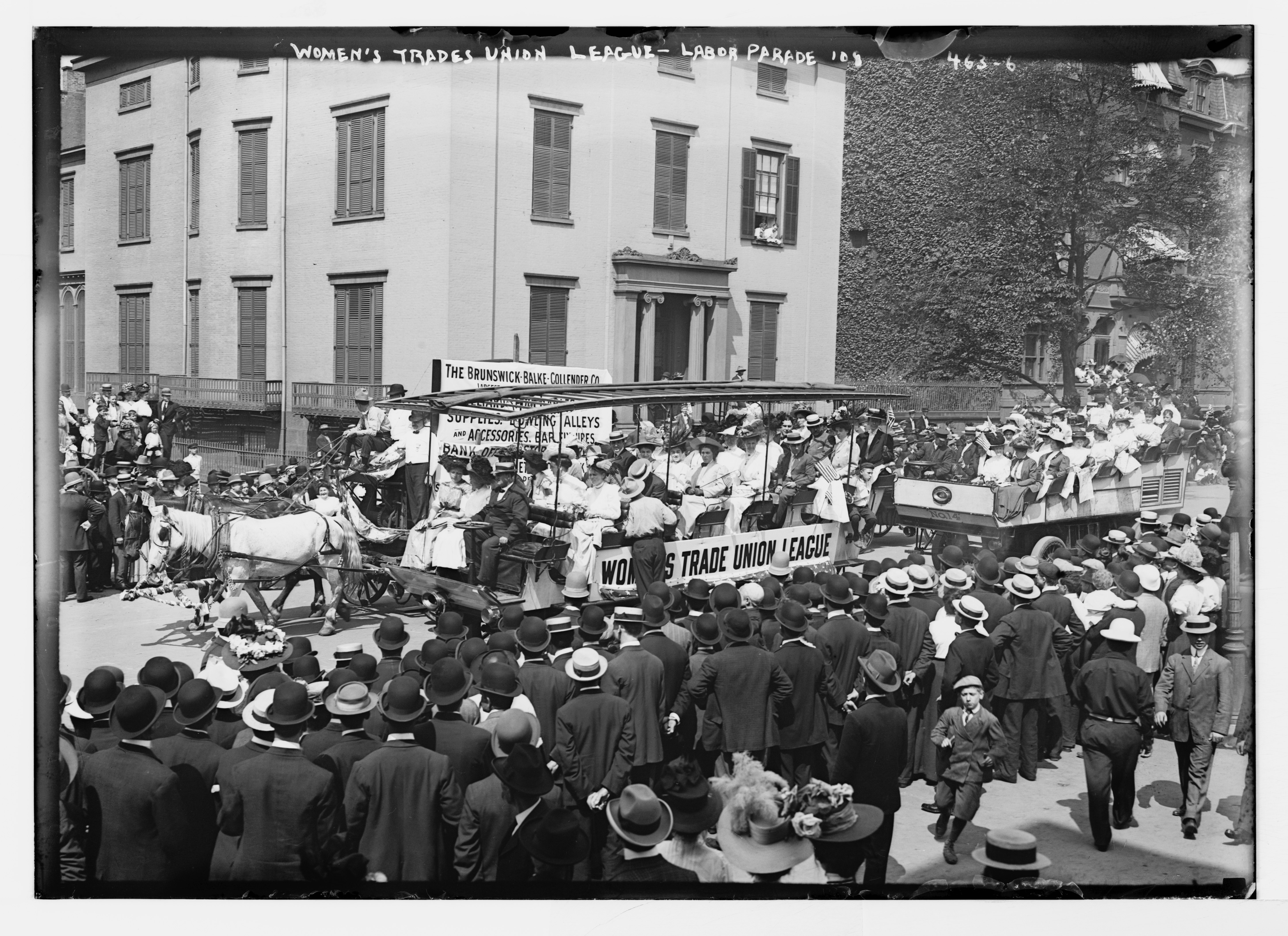
1908 WTUL Labor Day Parade

==== Formation ====
The Women's Trade Union League of America (WTUL) was formed in November 1903 after three meetings at a convention for the American Federation of Labor. Mary Morton Kehew became president, Jane Addams the vice-president, Mary Kenney O'Sullivan the secretary, and Mary McDowell the executive board.

An economic downturn in early 1904 caused union membership decline, and as a result, the WTUL struggled at its formation. The WTUL also discovered it was difficult to organize women due to lack of union knowledge and family obligations. Despite initial difficulty in organizing, the WTUL supported spontaneous strikes when the International Ladies' Garment Workers' Union (ILGWU) lacked funding. The WTUL offered groups of strikers help in exchange for their loyalty to the American Federation of Labor (AFL). Though the AFL affiliation caused issues within the league, the WTUL insisted on following the AFL's policies in order to retain status as reputable unionists.

A body of strong strike leaders and organizers, including Leonora O'Reilly and Josephine Casey, was developed within the WTUL by 1906. Allies of the WTUL helped to organize walkouts, boycotts, walk picket lines, and raise funds for the league.

In 1909 the WTUL purchased a large house at 43 East Twenty-second Street to be used as a meeting place for all women unionists, as proposed by Mary Dreier, the WTUL's New York leader Prior, many women's trade unions had met in small, dirty meeting halls, which led the WTUL to believe that the spacious meeting place would be more inviting and attractive for smaller unions.

==== Outreach ====
To reach out and inform women in the workforce, the WTUL wrote the text New World Lessons for Old World People, which contained essays and stories with subjects pertaining to working conditions, conflicts due to ethnicity, and laws within factories. They also formed the Good Health League, which held lectures to inform women about their personal well-being, and how their poor working conditions affected their health. Though many saw work as a temporary transition period between childhood and marriage, the WTUL attempted to urge women to view themselves as independent wage earners. Rallies and marches were held by the WTUL to protest the police brutality women faced while picketing.

Until 1955 the WTUL remained active.

=== Industrial Workers of the World ===
Mother Jones and striking textile workers

The IWW (Industrial Workers of the World) was founded in 1905. The IWW was founded by Mother Jones, Lucy Parsons, Bill Haywood, Eugene V. Debs, Daniel D. Leon, and Thomas J. Haggerty. Mother Jones was considered the IWW's "founding mother".

=== Garment work in 1909-1913 ===
==== International Ladies' Garment Workers' Union ====
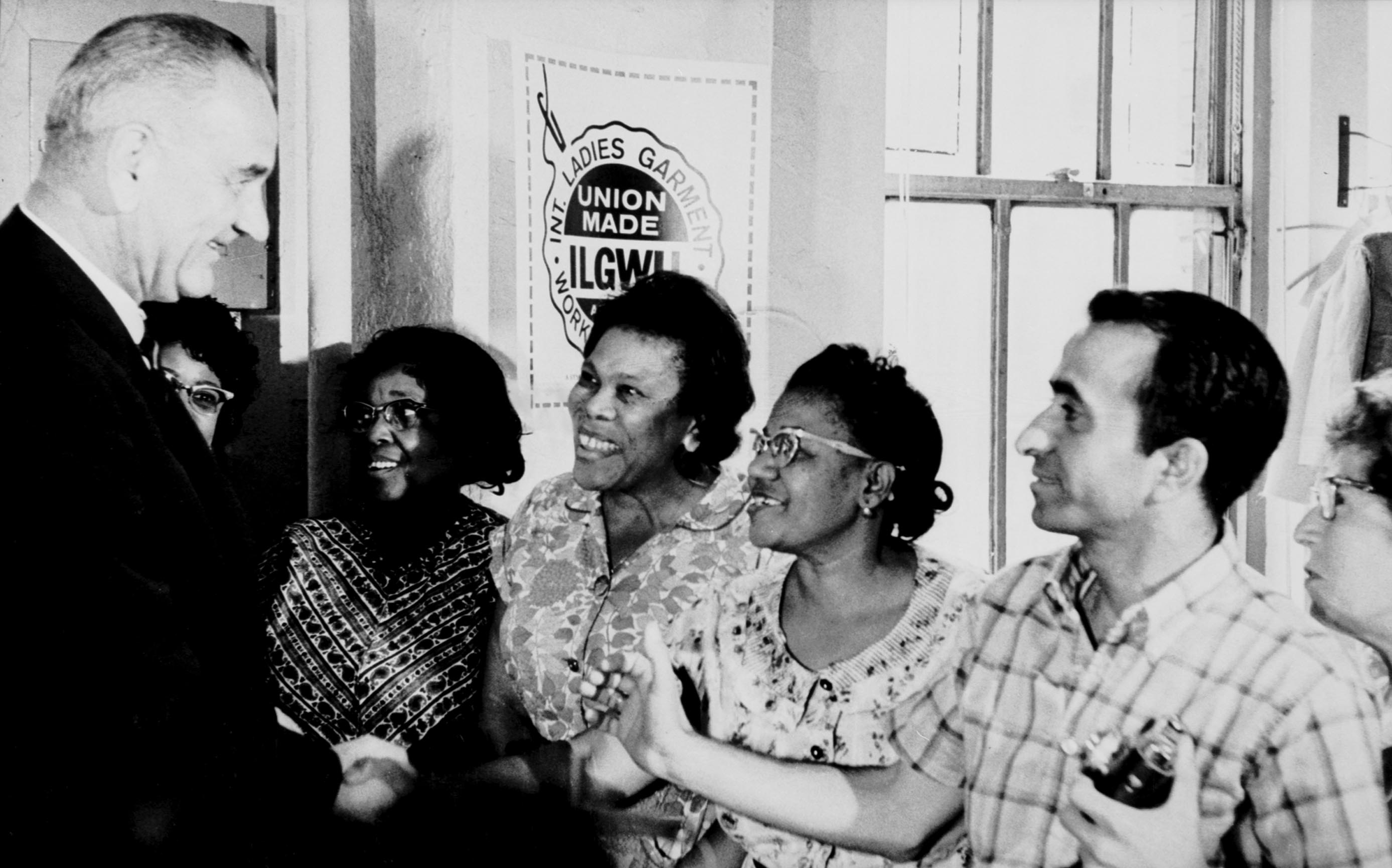
ILGWU workers meet Lyndon B. Johnson

In 1900 the International Ladies' Garment Workers' Union was formed. 27,000 women joined the ILGWU by 1904, as estimated by The Women's Trade Union League of America. Early women's unions were often in the garment trade, as the industry employed many working women. Women in the garment industry often had to purchase their own thread and needles in order to work, and often were fined for errors in their sewing.

==== New York shirtwaist strike of 1909 ====
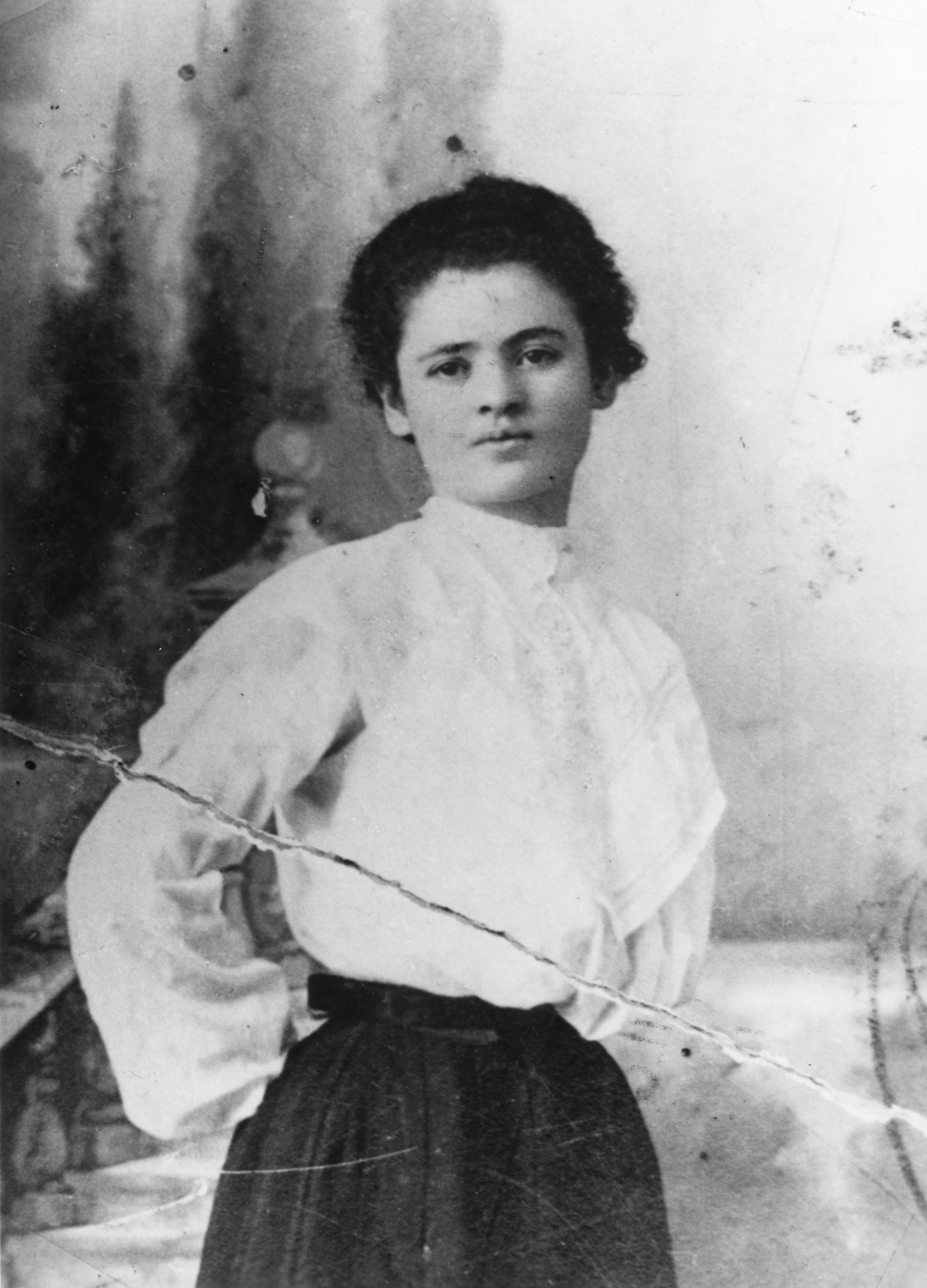
Clara Lemlich

In New York City working women employed by three major shirtwaist companies (the Leiserson Company, the Rosen Company, and the Triangle Shirtwaist Company) went to the Women's Trade Union League of America (WTUL) in 1909 to gain support in their strikes. Mary Dreier and hundreds of other women, were arrested while picketing. On November 23, 1909, Clara Lemlich's speech inspired the largest women's strike up to that point, which took place among primarily Jewish waist makers on the following day. The strike led more than 20,000 workers to walk out of 500 shops in New York City. 10,000 women went back to work by November 27, 1909, after the smaller manufacturers agreed to the wages proposed by the unions. Larger manufacturers did not comply, forcing the strike to lead into December, and eventually spread to Philadelphia. During these months violence increased on picket lines; women were assaulted, harassed, and arrested. Some arrested women were sent to the workhouse on Blackwell's Island. Clara and her workers were aiming for change in their company.

=== The United Auto Workers ===
==== World War II 1939–1945 ====
More than 200,000 women laborers entered the automotive trade during World War II, causing upset in labor division. On October 15, the UAW demanded that all female laborers were to be removed from work on heavy machinery or they would strike. After two more women laborers were hired, the strike commenced and was a victory after 36 hours of protest. As a result, women were permitted to only work in areas deemed appropriate for their gender. Women laid off from the auto industry were also unable to work in defense jobs as they were not protected under the OPM Six-Point Transfer. 50 women unionists gathered in late October, demanding a woman representative be appointed into the Detroit Defense Employment Committee, however, their demand was not met. This issue later became obsolete as the demand for wartime workers grew. By November 1943 26 percent of the automotive labor force was made up of women, as opposed to the previous 5 percent. On September 26, 1942, the National War Labor Board established that women and men must be paid the same rate, in order to settle disputes in labor forces. By September 1944, 105 women were delegates at the UAW's yearly convention.

==== Activism ====
Caroline Davis was elected president of Local 764 in 1944, and was reelected four more times. Davis in 1948 was appointed to the staff of the International Union, ending her presidency of Local 764. A CIO affiliate, the Detroit Industrial Union Council, elected its first woman organizer, Mae McKernan. After a proposal submission to the IEB, the UAW Women's Bureau was established, electing Mildred Jeffery as its first director. December 8 and 9 1944 a women's conference was held and attended by 149 women from 46 states in 99 union locals. Women addressed concerns about postwar work and issues of workplace seniority.

==== Intersectionality ====
UAW leaders and the NAACP advocated for workers of color, resulting in the employment of black women in the automotive industry. Though protests occurred, the UAW continued to advocate for their African American employees, threatening to fire groups of workers on the opposition. As a result of the support from the UAW, black women became active in unions and sought positions of leadership. Lillian Hatcher, a black woman unionist in February 1944 organized local 742's first women's conference.

==== Postwar work 1945–1947 ====
After World War II, despite efforts from women labor unionists, the women in the automotive industry started to become frequently laid off, despite seniority. Women also found it more difficult to find work outside of defense jobs at this time. In Detroit 1945, outside of Ford Motor Company's factory, 200 unionized women held a protest in opposition to the company's widespread layoff of women laborers in favor of hiring of less qualified male workers.

== United Kingdom ==
The National Federation of Women Workers influenced the Liberal Party in introducing the Trade Boards Act 1909, which set minimum wages for industries with a high proportion of female workers.
