= Kate Mullany House =

National Historic Site of the United States

- U.S. National Register of Historic Places
- U.S. National Historic Landmark District
- U.S. National Historic Site
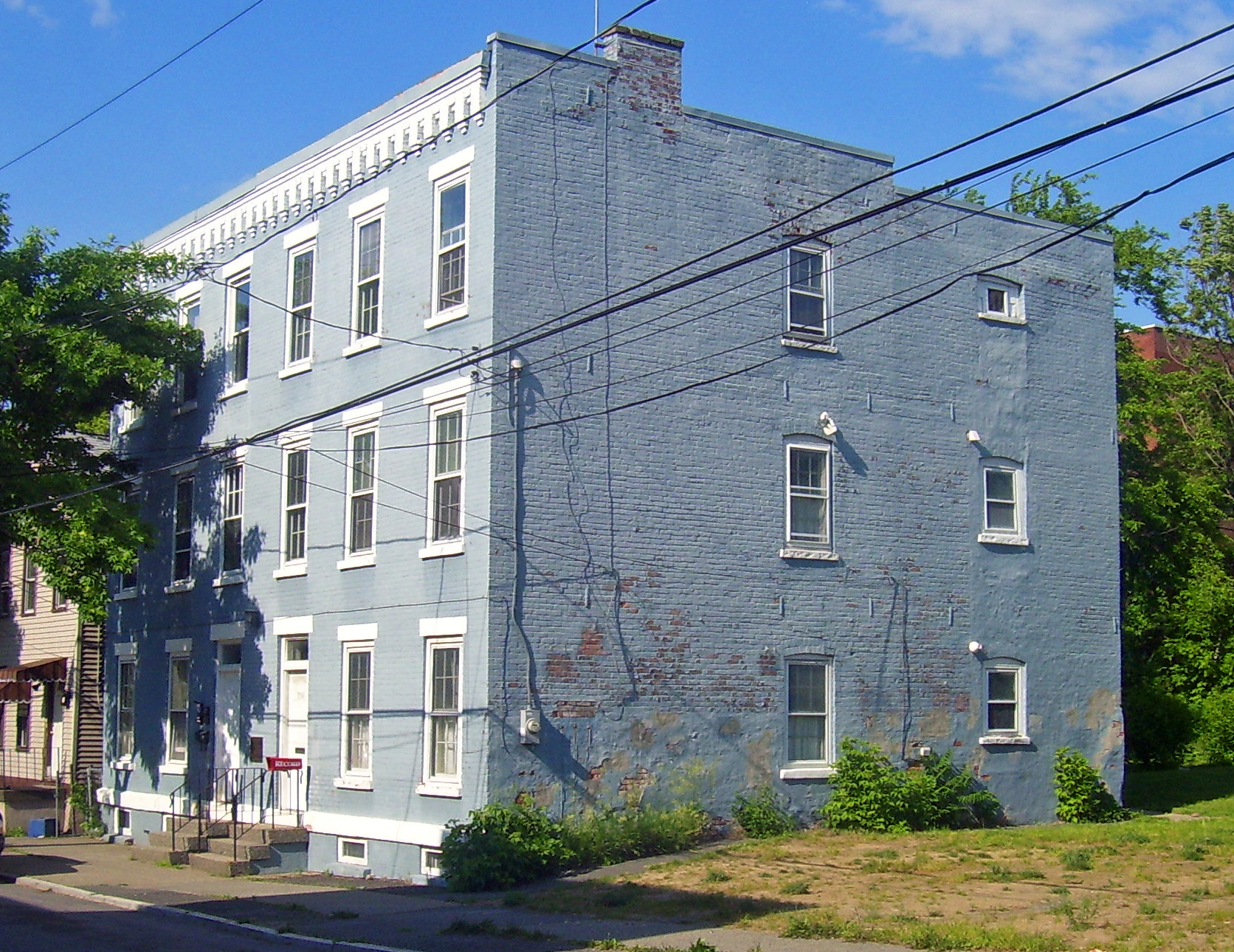

- Location within New York
- Location: 350 8th Street, Troy, NY
- Coordinates: 42°44′23.64″N 73°40′54.49″W
- Built: 1869
- Architectural style: Italianate
- NRHP reference No.: 98000453

Significant dates
- Added to NRHP: April 1, 1998
- Designated NHLD: April 1, 1998
- Designated NHS: December 3, 2004

The Kate Mullany House was the home of Kate Mullany (1845–1906), an early female labor leader who started the all-women Collar Laundry Union in Troy, New York in February 1864. It was one of the first women's unions that lasted longer than the resolution of a specific issue. It is located at 350 8th Street in Troy, just off NY 7 one empty lot east of the Collar City Bridge.

The house was declared a National Historic Landmark in 1998. It is now a National Historic Site. The site also includes Mullany's grave. The New York State Senate honored the house and its most famous resident for Women's History Month in March 2007. The house is also on the New York Women's Heritage Trail.

== Designation as a National Historic Site ==
Then First Lady Hillary Clinton toured the house in 2000, and named it as a "treasure". Senator Daniel P. Moynihan had introduced a bill to designate the home as a National Historic Site, but the bill languished in the United States Senate.

Senator Clinton took up the bill in January 2001 when Moynihan retired, and she advocated for the home. There were hearings on the bill, and the Congressional Budget Office undertook an official budget analysis for the United States Congress. The bill was co-sponsored by Senator Clinton and Representative Mike McNulty, supported by organized labor, and was passed into law. It is an affiliated area of the National Park Service; it remains privately owned and operated but the NPS provides technical support.

On November 10, 2020, a car crashed through the building's back wall. Though no one was injured, the National Park Service reported that the "damage to the back wall was so extensive that engineers worried the second floor might collapse". Before the incident, the site was planned to open in late 2020.

The site was officially opened to the public on June 10, 2023, with a public celebration hosted by Paul Cole, executive director of the American Labor Studies Center who helped organize fundraising for the site.

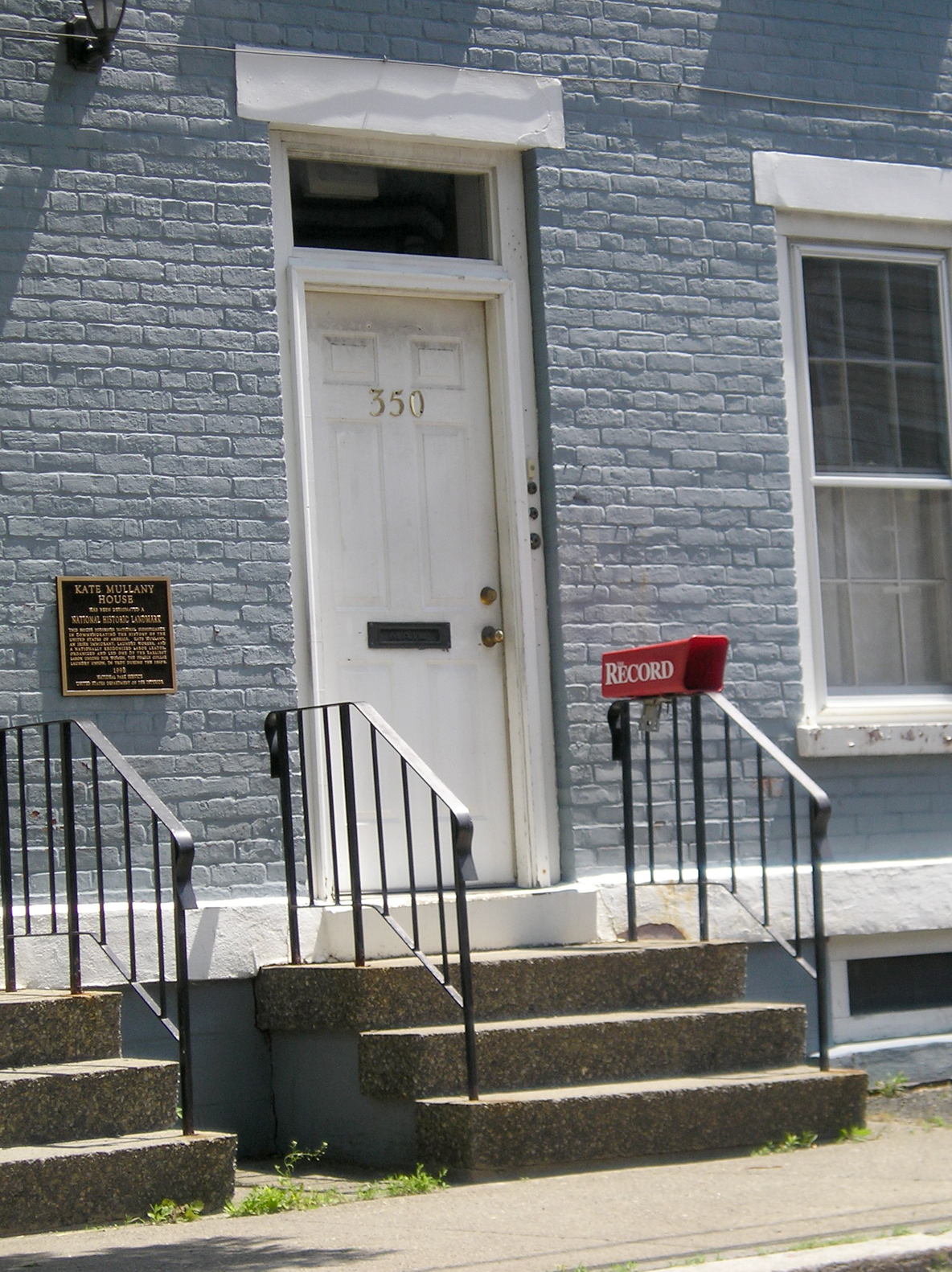
The doorway for the address occupied by labor organizer Kate Mullany

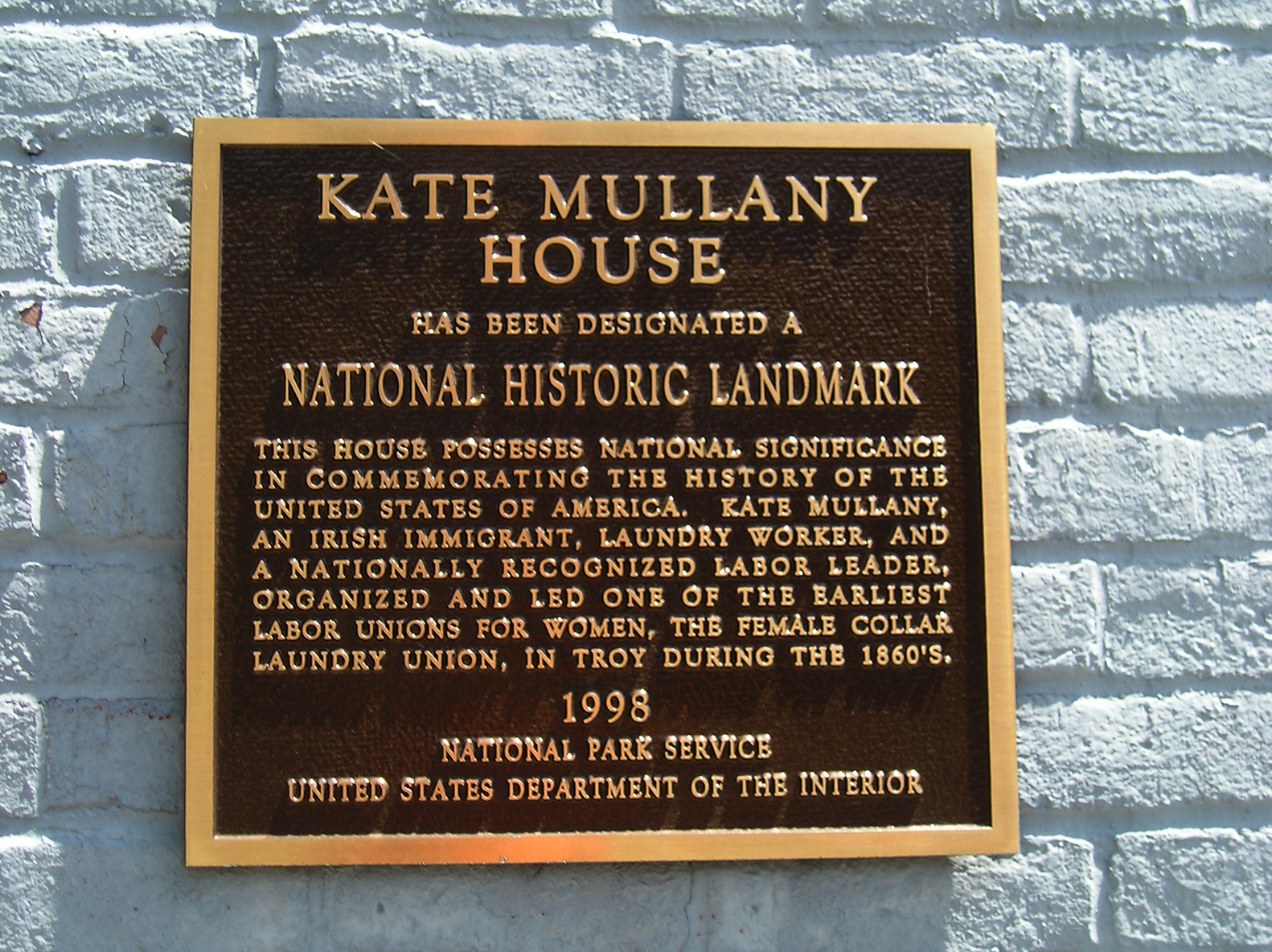
Informational commemorative plaque located on the brick façade between addresses 350 and 352 on Eighth Street in downtown Troy, NY

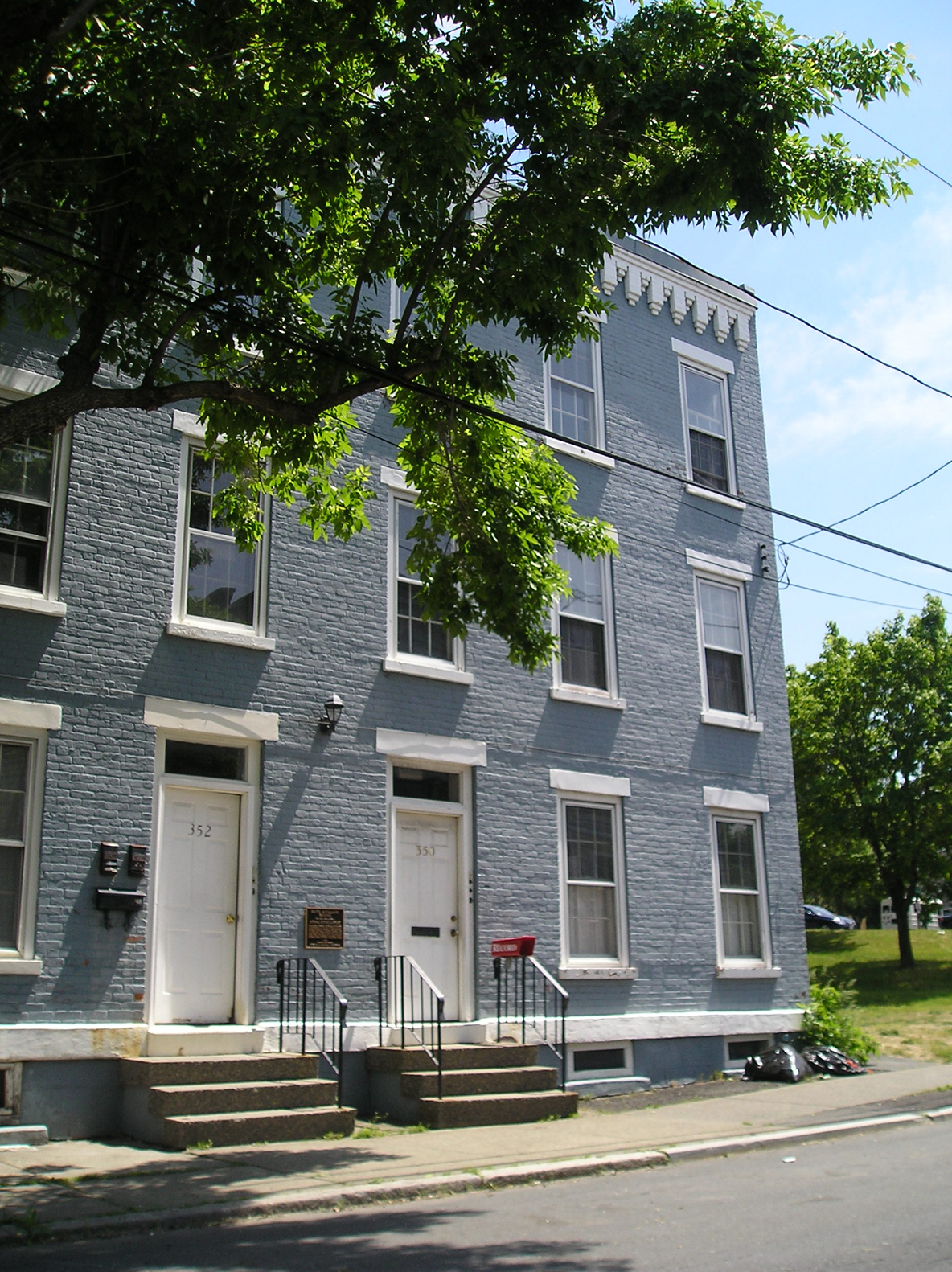
Side view capturing just the 350 section of the building from a little further down Eighth Street

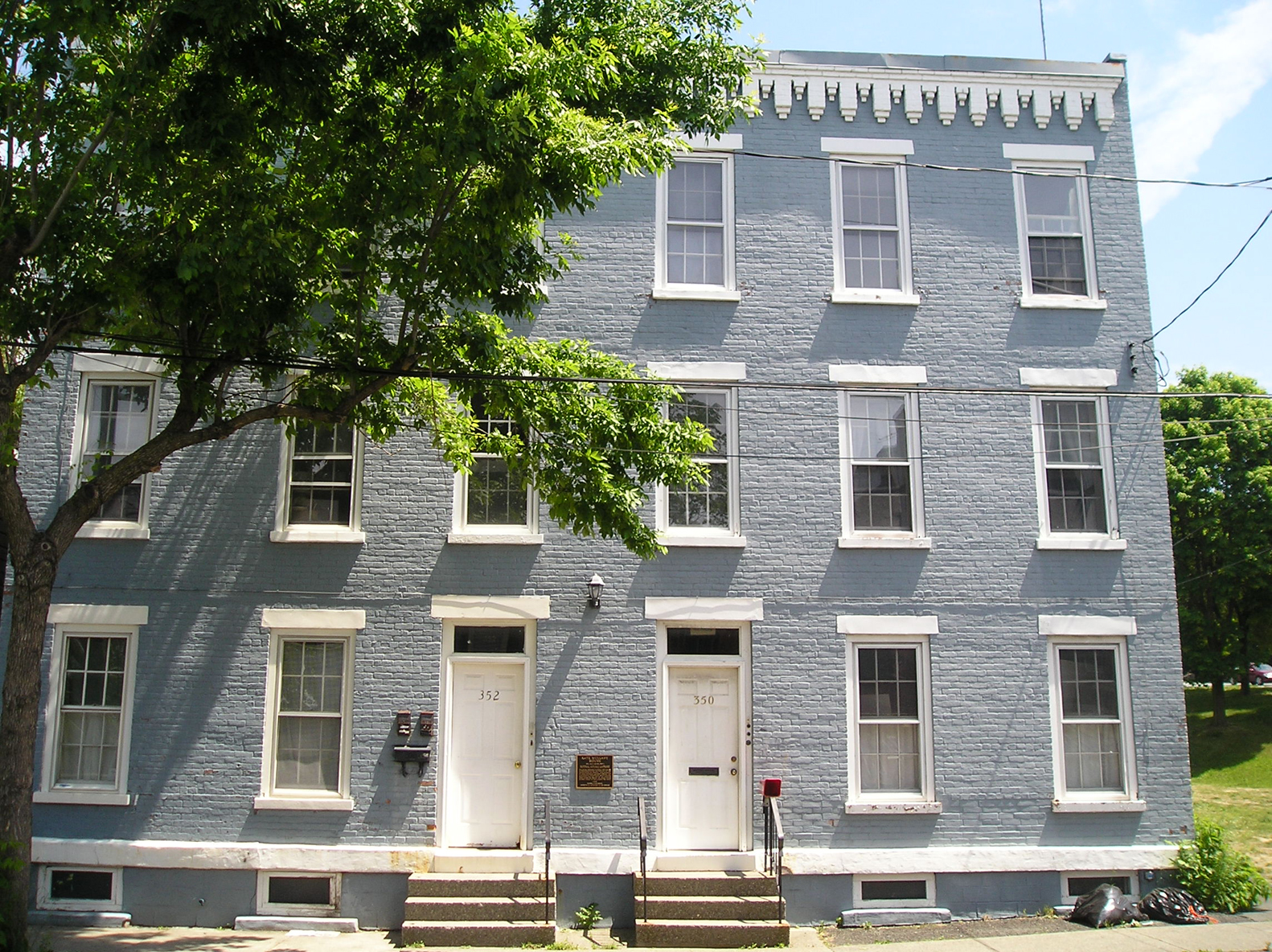
Labor organizer Kate Mullany's former home on 8th Street in downtown Troy, New York as photographed 30 May 2008.
