= Cumberland Gap National Historical Park =

Historic area in Kentucky, Tennessee, and Virginia, U.S.

- U.S. National Register of Historic Places
- U.S. National Historical Park
- IUCN Category V (Protected Landscape/Seascape)
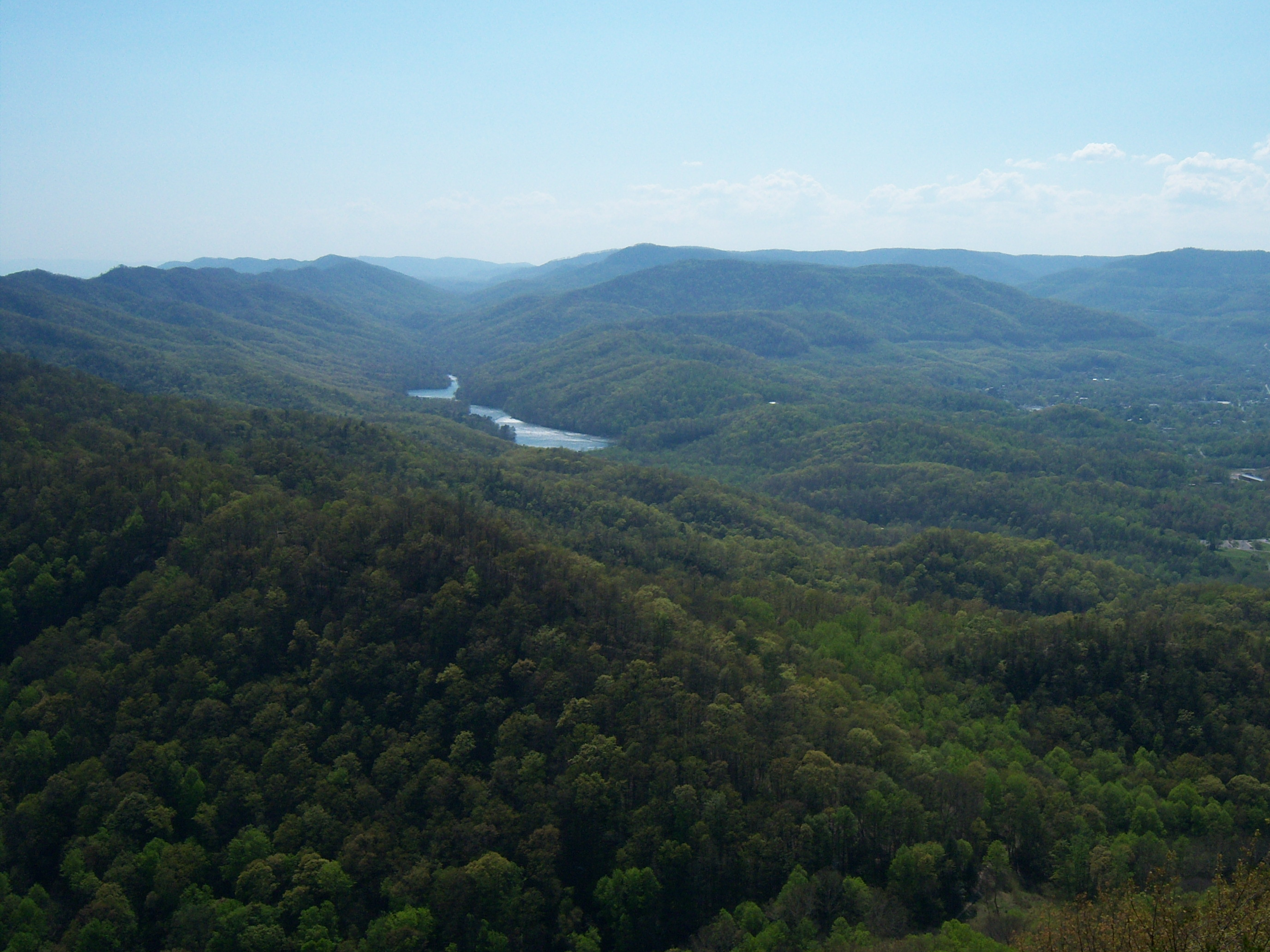
- View from the Pinnacle Overlook toward the southwest, overlooking Fern Lake and the surrounding park, 2009

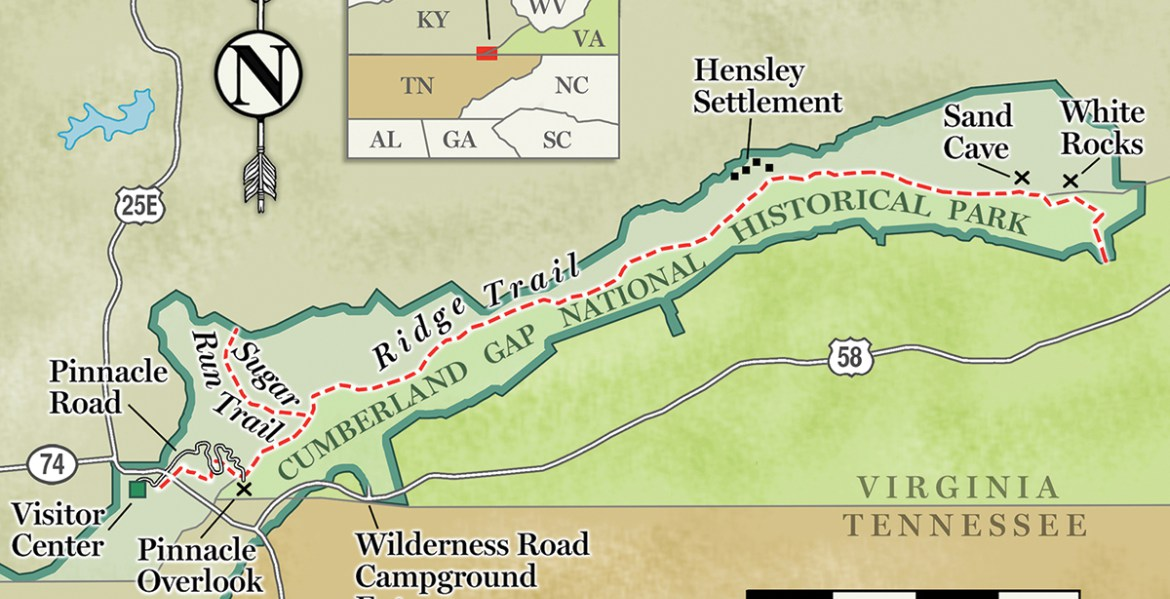
- Location: Kentucky, Tennessee, and Virginia, United States
- Nearest city: Cumberland Gap, Tennessee
- Coordinates: 36°36′15″N 83°41′14″W
- Area: 20,508 acres (8,299 ha)
- Visitation: 765,010 (2025)
- Website: www.nps.gov/cuga
- NRHP reference No.: 66000353
- Added to NRHP: October 15, 1966

The Cumberland Gap National Historical Park is a United States National Historical Park located at the border between Kentucky, Tennessee, and Virginia, centered on the Cumberland Gap, a natural break in the Appalachian Mountains.

The park lies in parts of Bell and Harlan counties in Kentucky, Claiborne County in Tennessee, and Lee County in Virginia. The park contains the Kentucky-Virginia-Tennessee tripoint, accessible via trail.

The town of Cumberland Gap, Tennessee, is located inside of the park's territory.

The Cumberland Gap Visitor Center is located on U.S. Highway 25E just southeast of the city of Middlesboro, Kentucky, and just northwest of the Cumberland Gap Tunnel and the town of Cumberland Gap, Tennessee. The visitor center features a museum with interactive exhibits about the Gap's role as a transportation corridor, an auditorium that shows films about the area's cultural and natural history, a book store and the Cumberland Crafts gift shop with crafts from Appalachia.

== Physical geography ==
The park covers 24,000 acres (9,700 ha) and is among the largest national parks in the eastern United States. As of 2010, 14,091 acres (5,702 ha) of this was designated as Recommended Wilderness. Elevation varies from a low of 1,100 feet (340 m) to a high of 3,500 feet (1,100 m).

The park runs along the Cumberland Mountains, stretching about 20 miles (32 km) with an average width of 1.6 miles (2.6 km). The park straddles a tri-state area encompassing land from Kentucky, Tennessee, and Virginia. It includes the area of the Wilderness Road running through the passage across the Cumberland Plateau and through the Cumberland Gap, an important geological feature that facilitated travel for American settlers and Native Americans. It includes 24 known cave features ranging in size from around 20 feet (6.1 m) to more than 16 miles (26 km) in length.

There are a number of large cliff systems in the park, the most prominent of which is the 500 feet (150 m) cliffs of White Rocks, located in the eastern portion of the area. At the northeastern end, the park sits adjacent to the Sillalah Creek Wildlife Management Area and the Martin's Fork Wildlife Management Area and State Natural Area.

The climate of the area is mild, with hot and humid summers and mild winters, and an average annual temperature of 54 °F (12 °C).

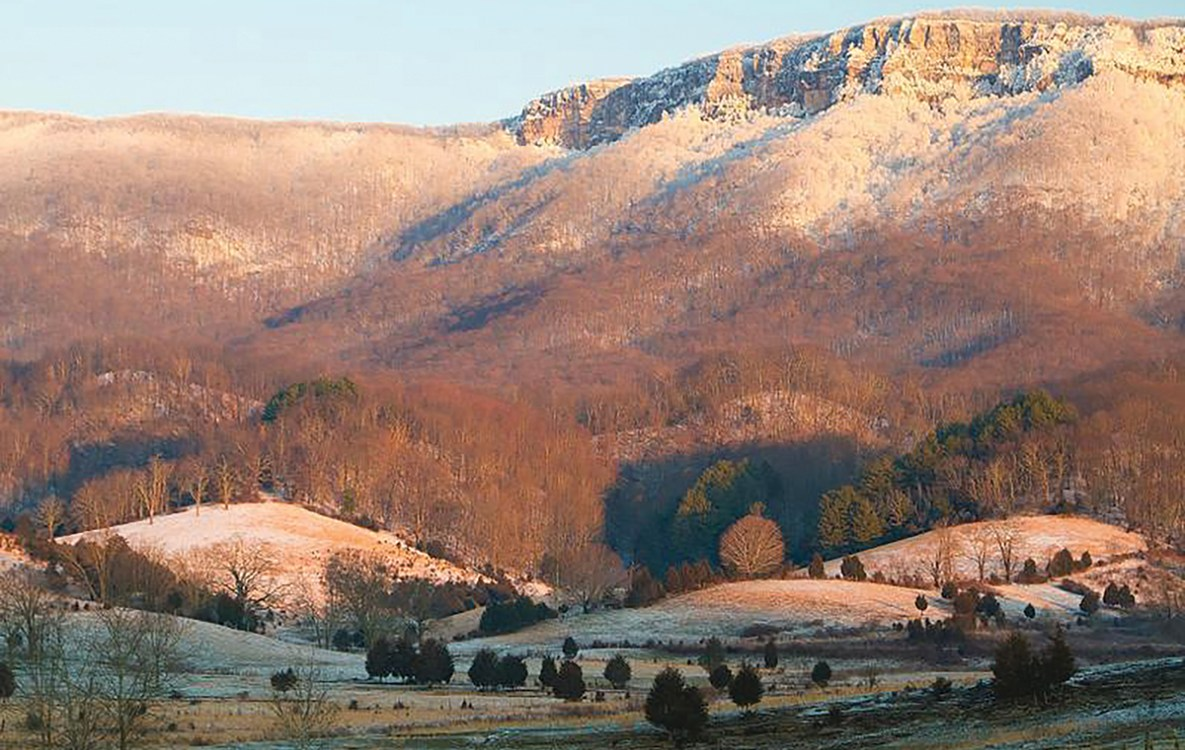
Winter view from beneath the White Rocks cliffs, in the far eastern portion of the park

=== Hydrology ===
The park contains over 62 miles (100 km) of streams. With the exception of one, Little Yellow Creek, all of these originate from within the park, with those to the north of the main ridge flowing into the Cumberland River, and those to the south flowing into the Powell River. Overall water quality in the park is good to fair, with some areas falling below recommended pH levels, likely due to natural causes, and others exceeding recommended levels of microorganisms, possibly due to contamination from campgrounds.

=== Ecology ===
The area of the park is 97% forested and contains 970 species of vascular plants, 90 of which are classified as sensitive or rare species. These include 108 non-native species of plants, and 31 considered to be highly aggressive invasive plants. (Note: A 2006 study listed the six plants which would be most beneficial if removed from the park as being: Japanese stiltgrass, autumn olive, Johnsongrass, princesstree, tree of heaven, and Mimosa.)

The park is home to at least 145 species of birds, and 40 species of mammals, including the near-threatened bat, Myotis sodalis (Indiana bat). The streams in the park house around 27 species of fish, including Chrosomus cumberlandensis (blackside dace), federally listed as an endangered species. Additionally, surveys have identified at least 36 species of reptiles and amphibians.

Ecosystems in the park are threatened by a number of insect infestations from non-native pest species, including Dendroctonus frontalis (southern pine beetle), and Adelges tsugae (hemlock woolly adelgid). The species Agrilus planipennis (emerald ash borer) and Lymantria dispar dispar (gypsy moth) also represent imminent threats from surrounding areas.

== History ==
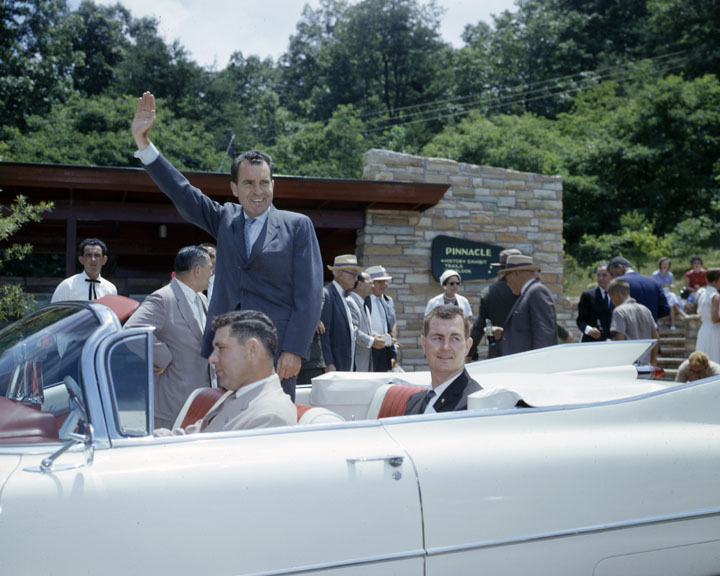
Vice President Richard Nixon at the Pinnacle Interpretive Shelter, attending the dedication of the park's Visitor Center (Mission 66 project), July 1959.

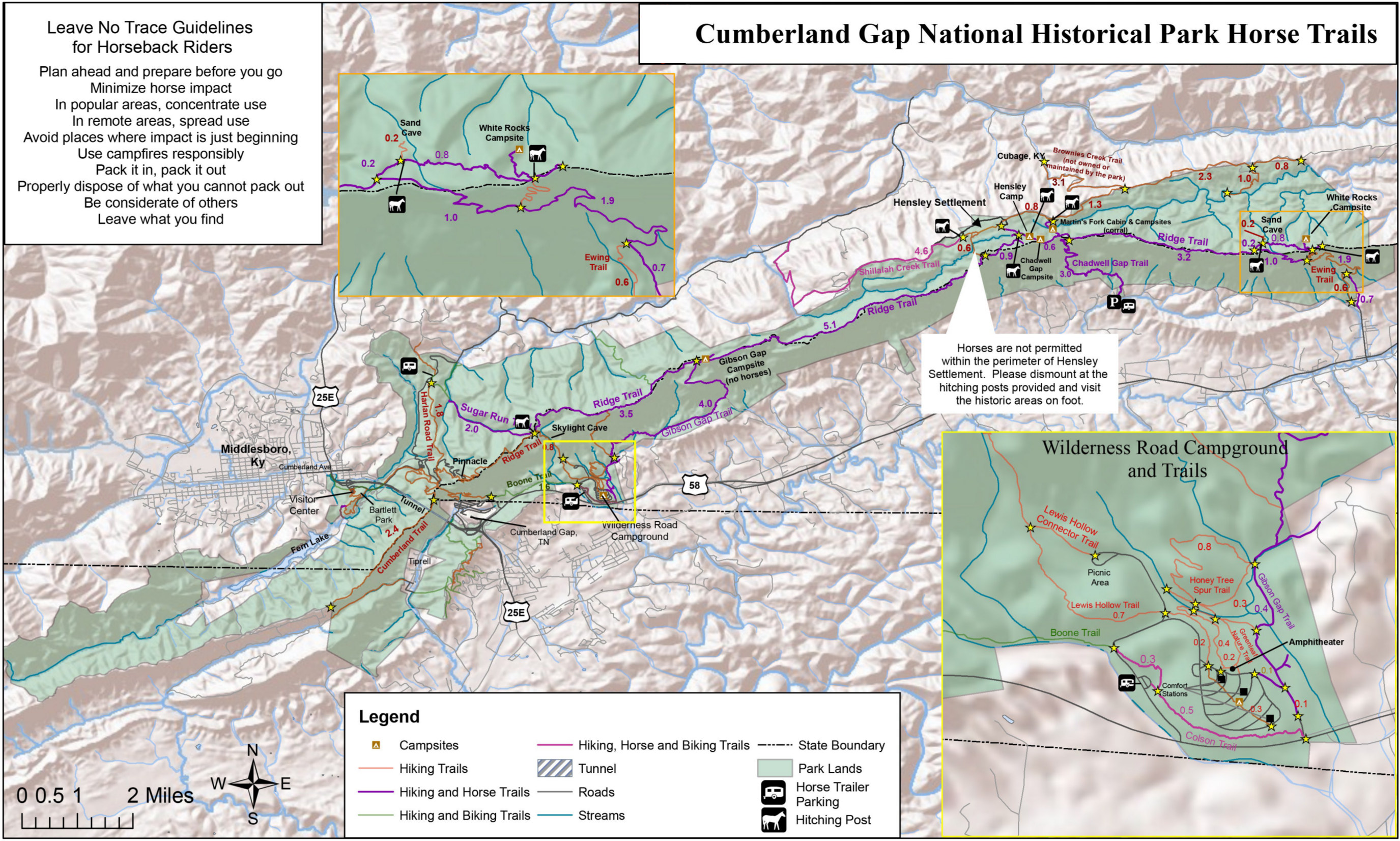
National Park Service map of horse trails within the park

Business leaders from Middlesboro, Kentucky, meeting in Cincinnati for the Appalachian Logging Conference, proposed a Lincoln National Park, centered around Fern Lake as early as 1922. However, two bills introduced into the Kentucky State Legislature the following year by State Congressman John Robison both failed. Later attempts in 1929 sought to create memorials for Civil War battles fought in the area, and also failed. In 1938, the National Park Service agreed to support a park if the lands were donated to form one, and the Cumberland Gap National Historical Park Association was created, sparking more unsuccessful attempts in Kentucky, and then passage of a bill in Virginia in 1939 that paved the way for federal authorization.

The park was established on June 11, 1940, by Franklin Roosevelt in order to "commemorate the story of the first doorway of the west". It was authorized by Congress to occupy an area not to exceed 50,000 acres (20,000 ha). The surrounding states purchased and deeded the land of the park to the federal government in 1955, and the official opening took place in 1959.

In 1992, the park purchased the area surrounding Gap Cave, which had previously been privately owned. By 1996, the park had undergone some $280 million in improvements, including construction of the Cumberland Gap Tunnel.

Toward the southern end of the park lies Fern Lake, created by an earthen dam in 1890, which provides water to the nearby town of Middlesboro, Kentucky. The area surrounding the lake was purchased by the park in four phases following the passage of the Fern Lake Conservation and Recreation Act, increasing the overall size of the park by 20%:

- Phases I and II, 1,850 acres (750 ha) of land purchased in 2008 from Ataya Hardwoods by The Trust for Public Land and transferred to the park
- Phase III, 1,268 acres (513 ha) of land purchased in 2009 from Molpus Woodlands Group
- Phase IV, 905 acres (366 ha) of land purchased in 2009 from Molpus Woodlands Group

As of 2010 there were plans to acquire an additional 600 acres (240 ha) of land surrounding the lake. As of 2018, the park had an estimated $15 million in deferred maintenance.

== Accommodations ==
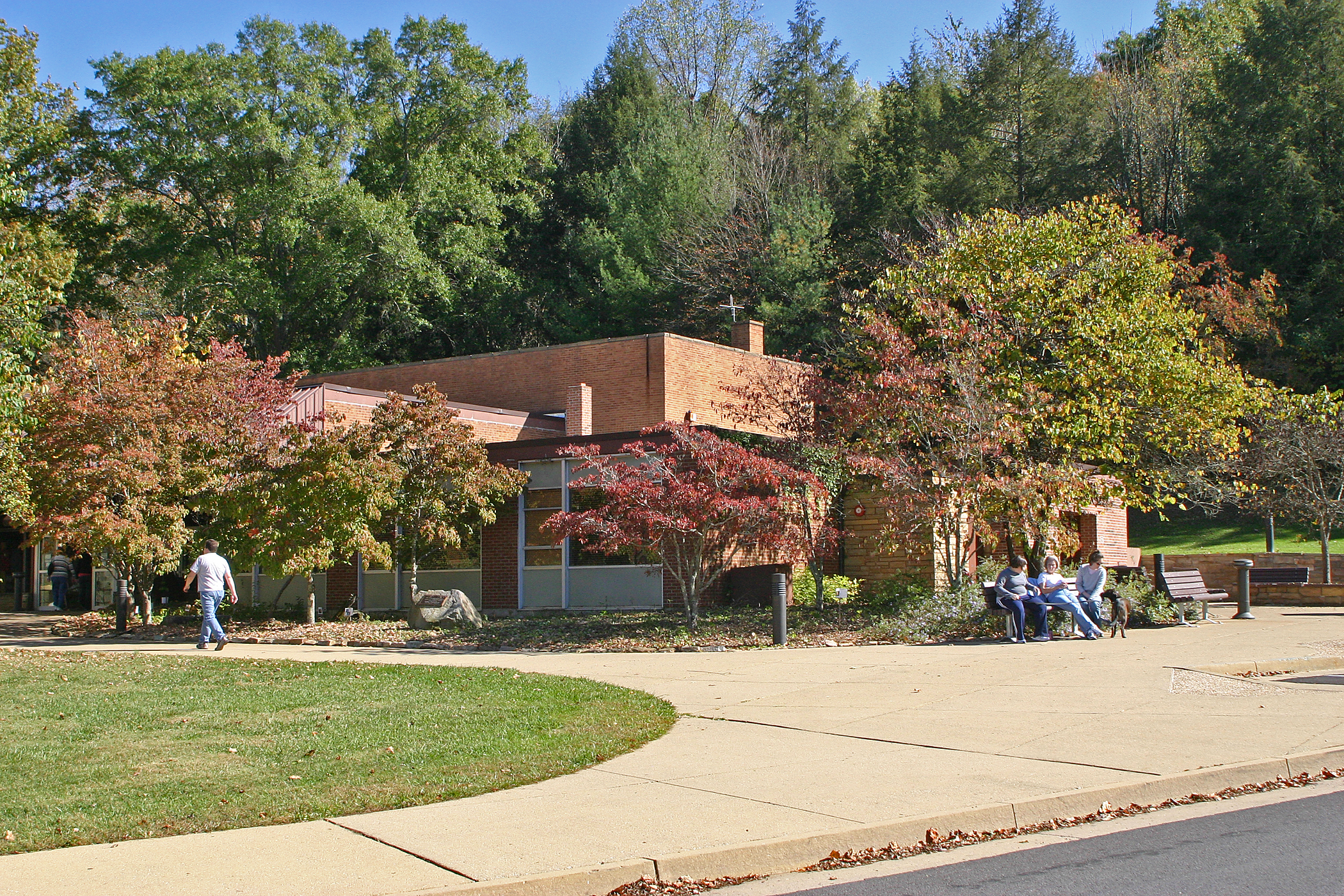
The exterior of the visitor center in 2008

The park includes a visitor center, renovated in 2004, which features a museum and auditorium, providing exhibits on the areas cultural and natural history, as well as book and gift shops.

Guided tours of the Hensley Settlement and Gap Cave are provided from the tourist center. Around 3.5 miles (5.6 km) from the center, along the Skyland Road, lies the Pinnacle Overlook, which, at an elevation of 2,440 feet (740 m), overlooks the gap and the surrounding country.

There are 85 miles (137 km) of hiking trails, ranging from shorter routes such as the 2.6 miles (4.2 km) Sugar Run Trail, to the 21 miles (34 km) Ridge Trail, which spans the park and reaches an elevation of 3,513 feet (1,071 m). The nearby Wilderness Road Campground includes 160 campsites. No hunting is permitted within the park.

Tri-State Peak is located in the park, and is accessible by trail. A marker designating the tripoint of the states of Kentucky, Tennessee, and Virginia, is located at the peak of the mountain.

=== Tourism ===
The park saw 737,547 visitors in 2017, according to statistics by the National Park Service. According to one federal study, in 2013 visitor spending amounted to $46 million in nearby communities, supporting 639 local jobs. Peak rates of visitation normally occur during the seasons of spring, summer and fall.

== Recognition ==
In 2017, the park received the Keeper of the Light Award from the Southeast Region of the National Park Service, which recognizes excellence in education. In 2016, the United States Mint released a commemorative quarter as part of the America the Beautiful series honoring the park.

== See also ==
- Big South Fork of the Cumberland River
- Cumberland Falls State Resort Park
- Lists of state parks by U.S. state
- List of areas in the United States National Park System
- List of Kentucky state parks
- List of mountain passes
- List of national parks of the United States
- List of Tennessee state parks
- List of Virginia state parks
- Mammoth Cave National Park
- Pine Mountain State Resort Park
