= Gap Cave =

Cave in Virginia (US)

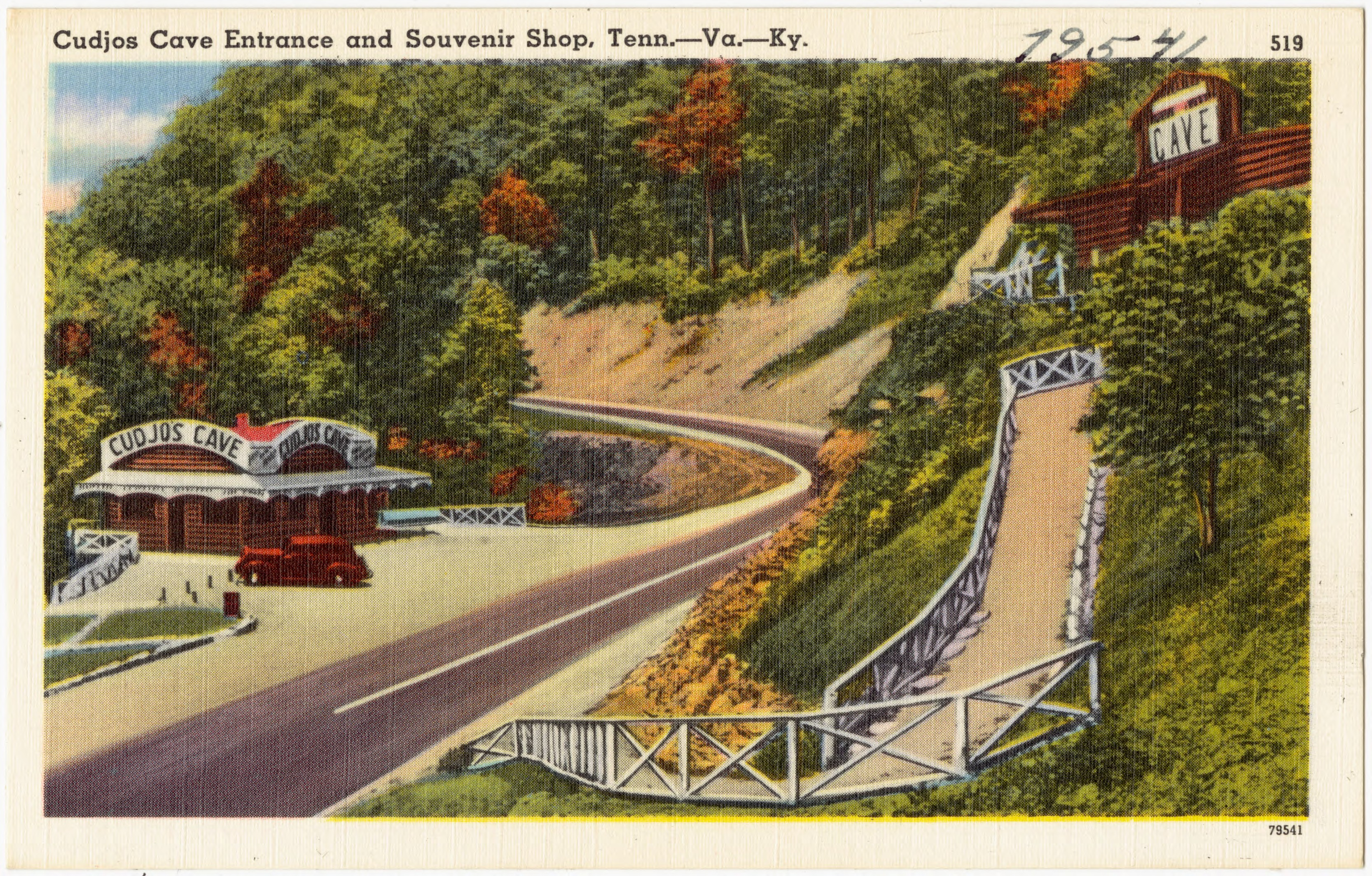
- Postcard c.1940s

- Location within Virginia Location within the United States
- Interactive map of Gap Cave
- Location: Wilderness Rd, Ewing, Virginia
- Coordinates: 36°36′10″N 83°40′01″W

Gap Cave is located just underneath Pinnacle Overlook in the Cumberland Gap National Historical Park, Claiborne County, TN. The entrance to the cave is at the tristate area of Tennessee, Virginia and Kentucky, just over the border into Virginia. Currently, the cave has a surveyed length of 18.5 miles and is the 42nd longest cave in the United States and 154th in the world. There are six known entrances: the Gap Cave Entrance (also known as the King Solomons Cave Entrance), an artificial entrance, known as the Cudjo's Cave Entrance, the Stream Entrance, the Soldiers Cave Entrance, the Big Saltpeter Cave Entrance, and the Wellhole. All lead into the same cave, Gap Cave.

== History ==
Throughout the years Gap Cave has had many names. It was named first by Dr. Thomas Walker in 1750, who named it Gap Cave. Walker was the guardian of young Thomas Jefferson after Jefferson's father's death. Daniel Boone passed through Cumberland Gap in 1775 and must have also seen the cave's entrance. Boone and his contemporary, an African American, Monk Estill, are the first on record to have made gunpowder in Kentucky. Saltpeter mining at Cumberland Gap may well have begun before 1800. An adjacent cave, sometimes referred to as Soldiers Cave, was explored by Confederate and Union soldiers as well as Gap Cave. Local historians say armies used Soldiers cave as a military hospital and for storage. Names and dates inscribed along the cavern walls document military presence. There is evidence that the greater part of the Gap Cave system was used to mine for Saltpeter in the 1800s and became known as the Saltpeter Cave.

In the later 1890s commercial tours of the cave system began in Gap cave, then known as King Solomon's Cave. Electric lighting was installed in Soldiers Cave and a tunnel was dug to later connect King Solomon's Cave with Soldiers Cave. In 1864 J. T. Trowbridge published a novel (Cudjos Cave) about a slave that had escaped from slavery and was hiding out in a cave in the Cumberland Gap. This book was quite famous at the time and the setting for Cudjos is approximately the same as Gap Cave. The cave owners changed the cave's name to Cudjo's Cave to attract tourists.

In March 1920 Lincoln Memorial University bought the caverns and surrounding land from private owners., and in 1934 the Gap cave was re-opened to the public.

In 1947 the title was transferred to the Commonwealth of Virginia. Commercial tours of the caverns began by the National Park Service in 1992. From 1992 until somewhat recently cave tours were not being held. Gap Cave had been vandalized, broken light bulbs were around every corner, graffiti was on nearly every wall, and the stairs and bridges were very unstable.

In the early 1990s a concept plan was drawn up to restore the Cumberland Gap, including Gap Cave. The restoration was completed in the late 1990s to the early 2000s; the cave is nearly back to its original condition and tours now run off lantern light instead of electricity.

As of Oct.2015, 18.5 miles of passage has been mapped by CRF.
