= Kate Mullany =

American labor leader (1845–1906)

- Born: 1845
- Died: 1906 (aged 60–61)
- Known for: Inducted into the National Women's Hall of Fame for organizing the 1st female union in the USA. Mullany, led a successful 6-day strike in 1864 to increase wages and improve working conditions for the Collar Laundry Union.

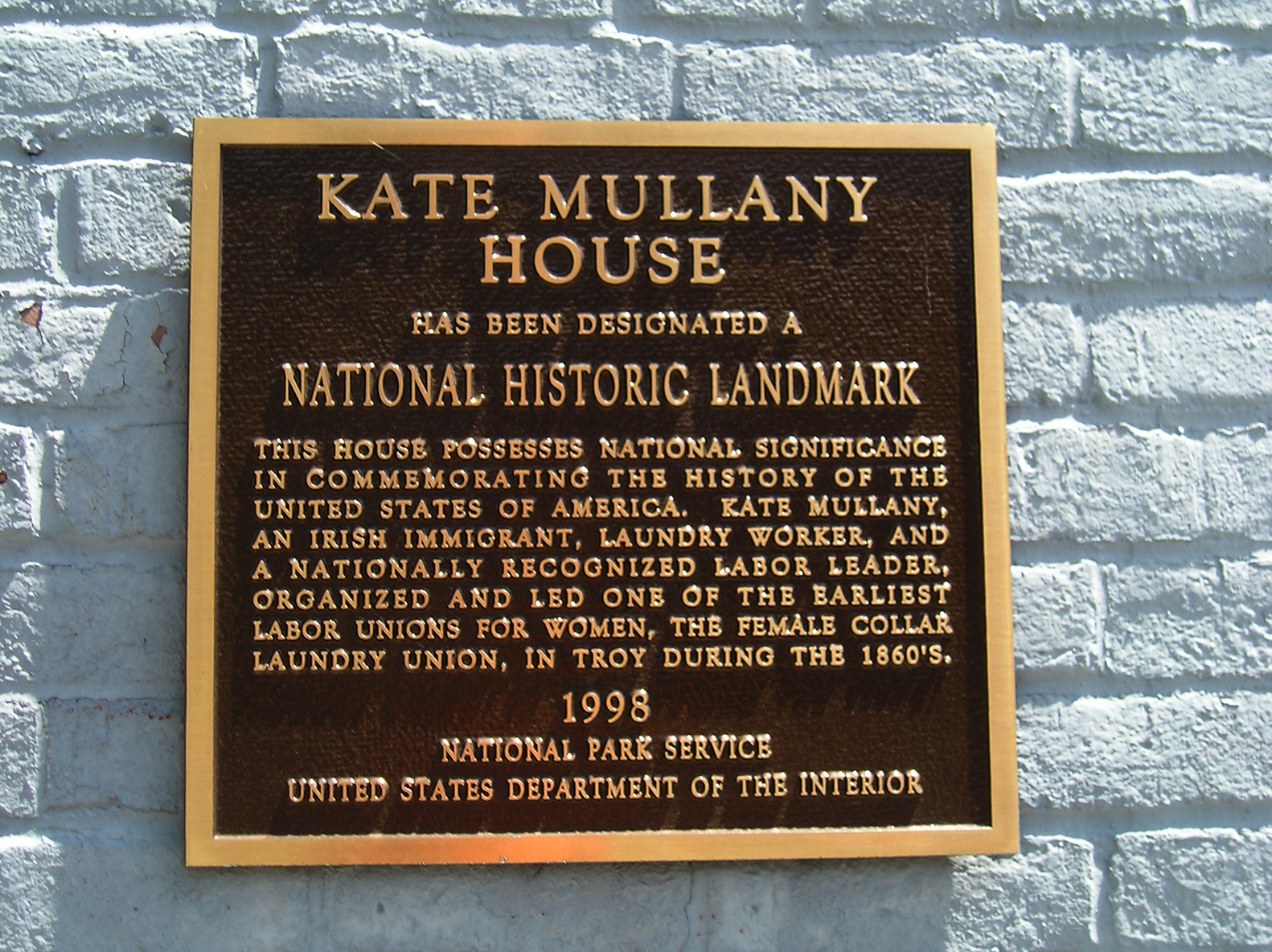
Commemorative plaque in honor of Kate Mullany located between 530 and 532 Eighth Street in downtown Troy, New York.

Kate Mullany (1845–1906) was an American early female labor leader who started the all-women Collar Laundry Union in Troy, New York in February 1864. It was one of the first women's unions that lasted longer than the resolution of a specific issue.

== Biography ==
Kate Mullany was an Irish immigrant born in 1845 who moved to the United States of America at a very young age. With her co-workers Esther Keegan and Sarah McQuillan, she organized approximately 300 women into the first sustained female union in the country, the Collar Laundry Union, in 1864. Mullany went on to be its president and was elected second vice-president of the National Labor Union.

At the age of 19, when her father died, Mullany had to work at a local laundry 12–14 hours a day for $3 a week. While working there, if she damaged an article of clothing, the company would reduce her wages to cover the cost of the damages. She led a successful six-day strike in 1864 with over 300 other women to increase wages and improve working conditions. The strike led to a 25-percent increase in wages.

The National Labor Union saw what Mullany was doing and they appointed her to be assistant secretary of the National Labor Union, a union of which she would later be elected the Vice President.

In 1869 she married John Fogarty and her obituary was listed under her married name. Around that time, Mullany also failed at trying to create new laundry and collar-making cooperatives. She died in 1906 and was buried in the Fogarty family plot in St. Peter's Cemetery, Troy, New York.

The Kate Mullany House, at 350 8th Street in Troy, was declared a National Historic Landmark in 1998, and became a National Historic Site in 2008.

In 2000, Mullany was inducted into the National Women's Hall of Fame. She has been honored by the New York State Senate, and her home is on the Women's Heritage Trail.

== See also ==
- Kate Mullany House
- Collar Laundry Union
- Troy, New York
- National Women's Hall of Fame
- National Labor Union
