= Hensley Settlement =

- U.S. National Register of Historic Places
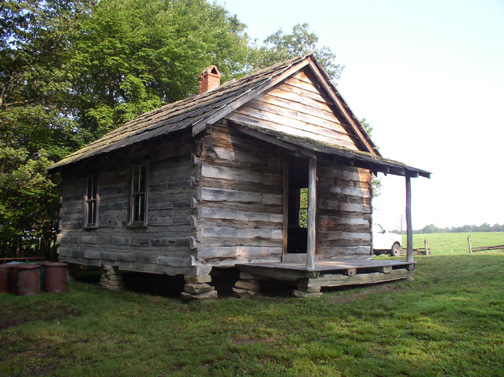
- Brush Mountain School House; Hensley Settlement

- Location within Kentucky Location within the United States
- Location: Bell County, Kentucky
- Coordinates: 36°40′10″N 83°31′42″W
- NRHP reference No.: 80000367
- Added to NRHP: January 8, 1980

Hensley Settlement is an Appalachian living history museum on Brush Mountain, Bell County, Kentucky in the United States. The settlement is part of the Cumberland Gap National Historical Park and it is located approximately 10 miles (16 km) north of the park visitor center on Ridge Trail.

The settlement contains twelve homestead log cabins, a one-room school house, and a blacksmith shop. A restored spring house on the property was used by the settlement as food storage. The settlement began in 1903 when brothers-in-law Sherman Hensley and Willy Gibbons settled their families on plots from acreage purchased by Burton Hensley Sr. Most inhabitants belonged to either the Hensley or Gibbons families. The settlement never developed modern infrastructure or technology.

The last resident was Sherman Hensley, who left in 1951. The school, together with some forty-five settlement structures and the agricultural environment, were restored to their original state in the 1960s by the Job Corps.

== Background ==
The settlement dates back to 1845 when Governor William Owsley deeded 500 acres (2.0 km^{2}; 0.78 sq mi) on top of Brush Mountain in the Appalachian Mountains. Brothers C. and R.M. Bales, who received the land from Owsley, leased the acreage to John Nichols and Jim Nelson, who mostly used the property for livestock. They cleared the property and made some improvements, including the construction of shake-roofed chestnut log cabins.

== Hensley ==
In 1903, Burton Hensley Sr. purchased the entire acreage and divided it into sixteen individual properties for his extended family. Hog farmer Sherman Hensley and his wife Nicey Ann, Barton Sr.'s daughter, moved into an existing log cabin on her allotted twenty-one acres. The couple purchased an additional thirty-three acres. The following year, Nicey's niece Nancy and her husband Willy Gibbons also moved to the self-sustaining settlement. Most of the inhabitants of the settlement were named either Hensley or Gibbons, belonging to one of those families. The settlement never had electricity, indoor plumbing, modern roads or other conveniences. Everything was grown, raised and hand-made in the settlement. People traveled by foot or by riding a horse. A spring house was used for food storage.

== School house ==
In 1908, Bell County provided a teacher for the newly erected one-room school house. Originally the school house was little more than a lean-to, erected so the Bell County Superintendent of Schools would agree to send a teacher for the settlement children. The school taught students up through the 8th grade. By the time the school closed in 1947, four different structures had served as the Brush Mountain school. The final structure was a log cabin that was heated by a wood and coal stove made of cast iron and located in the middle of the room. The school had no indoor plumbing or electricity. The student desks were made of wood and cast iron.

== Later years ==
The population peaked at about 100 in 1925. During World War II residents moved away to either join the military or to work in the coal mines. Nicey Ann Hensley died in 1937. The population dwindled until 1949, when Sherman Hensley was the only resident. When Hensley finally abandoned the property in 1951, the settlement fell into disrepair.

== Today ==
The settlement was dedicated as part of the Cumberland Gap National Historical Park on July 4, 1959. The National Park Service and the Job Corps began making improvements in 1965, restoring some forty-five settlement structures and the agricultural environment to the prime time of the community.

The National Park Service runs the Appalachian Hensley Settlement as a living history museum. It conducts tours of the forty-five settlement structures and agricultural resources May through October.
