= Collar Laundry Union =

Former trade union of the United States

The Collar Laundry Union was the first all-female labor union in the United States. It was started in Troy, New York by Kate Mullany in 1864.

== Background ==
At the time, being a laundress was a difficult job. An almost exclusively female occupation, laundresses worked 12 to 14 hours a day in very hot buildings (which led to the origination of the term "sweatshop"). The pay was low, averaging 3-4 dollars a week. Working conditions were often unsafe, as laundresses used boiling water, strong chemicals, and hot irons. If damage occurred to an article of clothing during the laundering process, the cost of repair or replacement would be taken from the worker's pay.

== Union formation and activities ==
Mullany, only 19 years old at the time, was inspired by the success of men's labor unions. Along with co-worker Esther Keegan, she convinced their fellow workers to protest their low wages and unsafe working conditions by forming a union. On February 23, 1864, 300 members of the union went on strike. After six days, the laundry owners gave in to their demands and raised wages 25 percent.

In September 1868, Mullany was chosen to be the assistant secretary and national organizer for women of the National Labor Union in New York City. She was the first woman ever appointed to an office at the National Labor Union.

== Cultural heritage ==
Mullany's home at 350 8th Street in Troy, the Kate Mullany House, was added to the U.S. National Register of Historic Places, was declared a National Historic Landmark in 1998 and is included in New York State Women's Heritage Trail.
