= Pyramid Peak (Unalaska Island) =

Summit in Alaska, United States

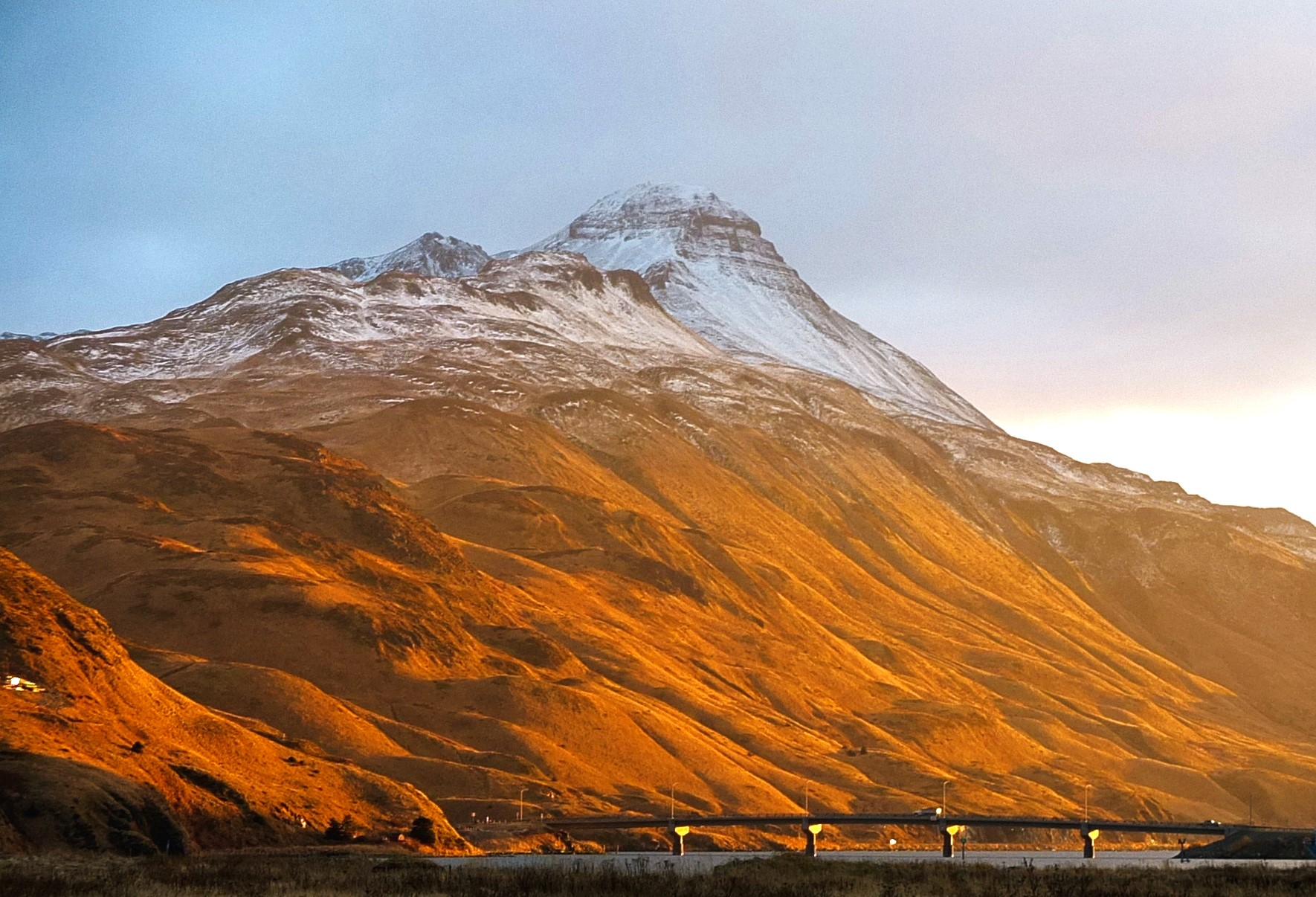
- North aspect

Highest point
- Elevation: 2,136 ft (651 m)
- Prominence: 1,200 ft (366 m)
- Parent peak: Peak 2417
- Isolation: 2.13 mi (3.43 km)
- Coordinates: 53°50′41″N 166°32′13″W

Geography
- Location within Alaska
- Interactive map of Pyramid Peak
- Location: Aleutians West Census Area
- Country: United States
- State: Alaska
- Parent range: Aleutian Range
- Topo map: USGS Unalaska C-2

Geology
- Rock type: Andesitic

Pyramid Peak is a 2,136-foot-elevation (651-meter) summit in Alaska, United States.

== Description ==
Pyramid Peak is part of the Aleutian Range. This iconic landmark of the Dutch Harbor area is set two miles (3.2 km) south of Unalaska on Unalaska Island of the Aleutian Islands. Precipitation runoff from the mountain drains into Captains Bay and Iliuliuk Bay. Topographic relief is significant as the summit rises over 2,100 feet (640 meters) above tidewater of Captains Bay in approximately one mile (1.6 km). The mountain's descriptive toponym was published in 1875 by the United States Coast Survey and has been officially adopted by the United States Board on Geographic Names.

== Climate ==
According to the Köppen climate classification system, Pyramid Peak is located in a subpolar oceanic climate zone with cold, snowy winters, and cool summers. Winter temperatures can drop to 0 °F with wind chill factors below −10 °F.

== Gallery ==
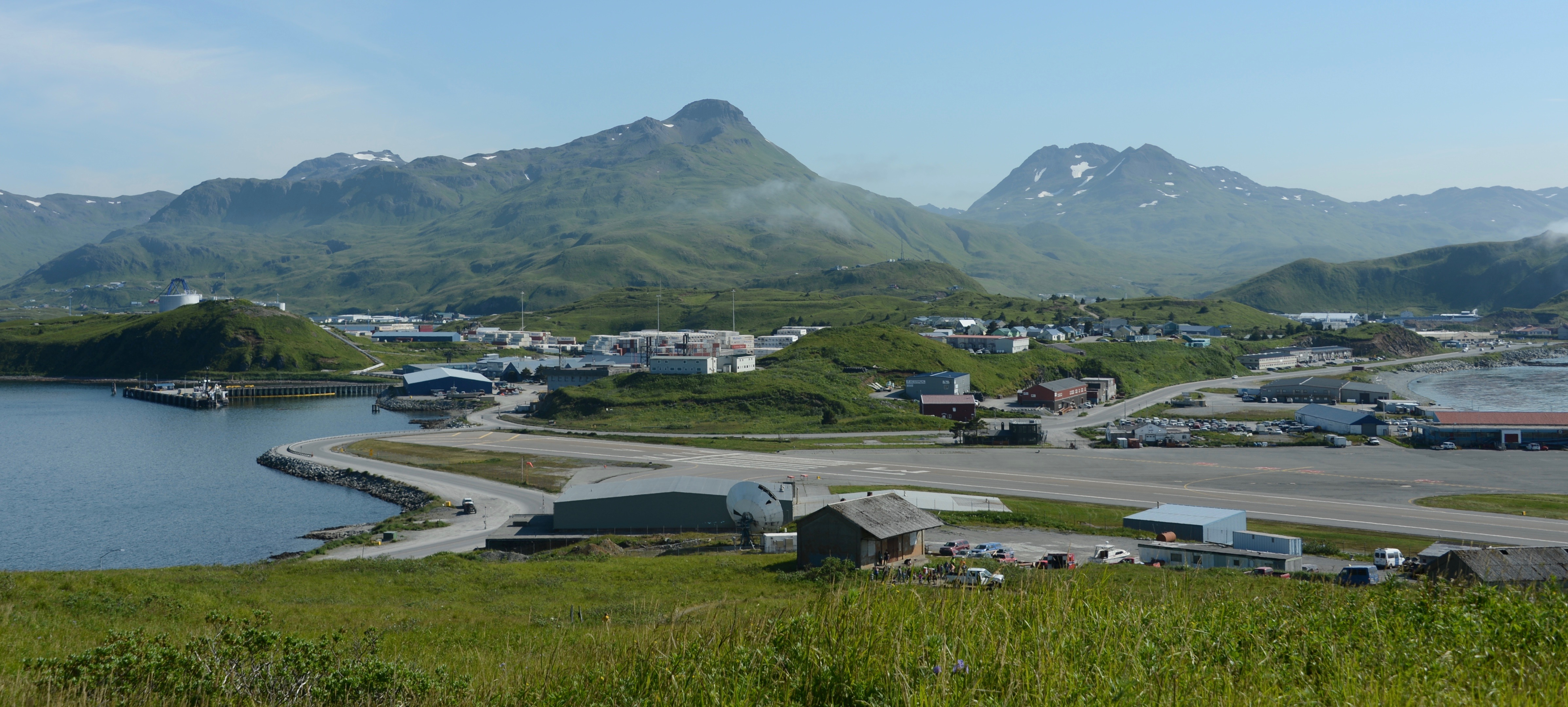
Pyramid Peak (center) viewed from airport at Dutch Harbor

== See also ==
- Mount Ballyhoo
- Mount Newhall
