= Cape Kalekhta =

Headland in Alaska, United States

Coordinates: 54°00′N 166°22′W

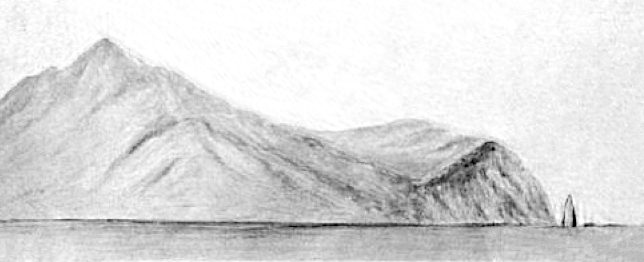
Cape Kalekhta and Priest Rock

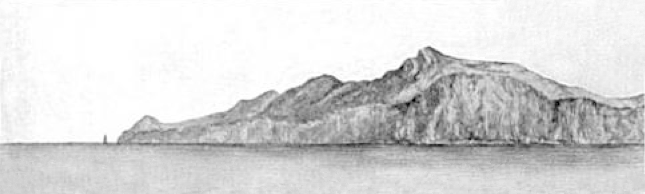
Priest Rock and Cape Kalekhta

Cape Kalekhta (also Cape Kalekta and Igognak) is a headland on the northeast coast of Unalaska Island in the U.S. state of Alaska.

The cape is approximately 500 feet (150 m) in height. It is the turning point when bound from any of the Fox Islands Passes to Dutch Harbor or Iliuliuk. It is a high, rocky promontory separating Unalaska Bay from Kalekhta Bay. The extremity and western side of the cape are rugged, precipitous cliffs, with a few rocks but no beach at the water line. Seen from a distance, its north end is convex in outline, being steepest at the water and sloping more gently toward the summit. From the summit of the cape, the land falls to the break at Constantine Bay, and then rises to the higher land farther south. While the position of this break can be distinguished, its full extent can be seen only when in Unalaska Bay. From most directions the end of the cape appears as a conical peak. North and west from Cape Kalekhta, distant 0.75 mile, is the outer extremity of a dangerous ledge which is usually well marked by breakers. The cape should be given a berth of 1.75 miles to clear the ledge, as the strong tidal currents may tend to carry a vessel on it.

Priest Rock, close-to off the northwest side of Cape Kalekhta, is a pinnacle about 80 feet high. While classed as a conspicuous landmark, its usefulness to strangers is uncertain. It can only be seen clear of the land when well through Akutan and Unalga passes and when close to the north side of Akutan Island. It shows against the land from all other directions and can not be made out except when close-to. There are similar rocks off several other points in this vicinity, which in thick weather might easily be mistaken by strangers for Priest Rock.
