= MV Kuroshima =

MV Kuroshima was a refrigerated cargo ship that ran aground and wrecked, resulting in an oil spill at Unalaska, Alaska in 1997.

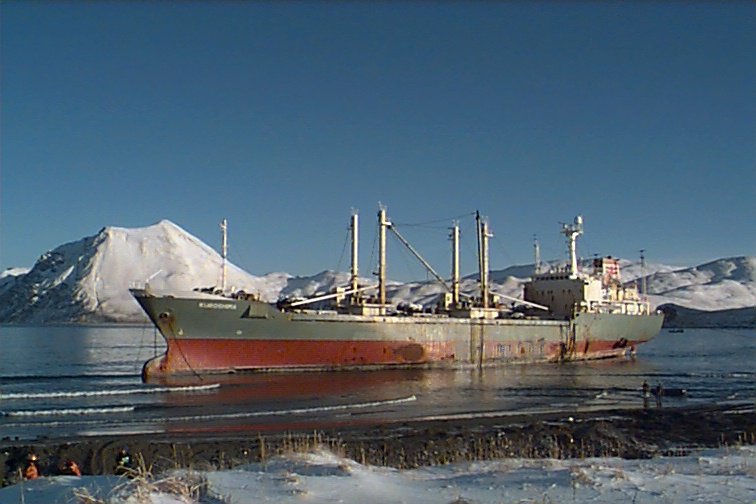
MV Kuroshima hard aground at Summer Bay Beach, December 1997

The 370-foot (110 m) refrigerated cargo vessel, owned by Kuroshima Shipping, broke away from its anchorage in Summer Bay on Unalaska Island, near Dutch Harbor, Alaska on November 26, 1997. As the ship attempted to move to a safer location, winds in excess of 100 knots (190 km/h; 120 mph) drove it into Second Priest Rock, then aground on the shore of Summer Bay.

Two crewmen were killed and approximately 39,000 US gallons (150,000 L; 32,000 imp gal) of heavy fuel oil were spilled in the shipwreck. High winds blew oil onto land, including into an archaeological site and into Summer Bay Lake. High winds and heavy seas prevented an air or sea rescue. The 16 survivors were pulled to safety with a line by United States Coast Guard rescuers standing on shore.

After the wreck, cleanup and vessel stabilization were conducted by the United States Coast Guard, the State of Alaska, and Kuroshima Shipping.
