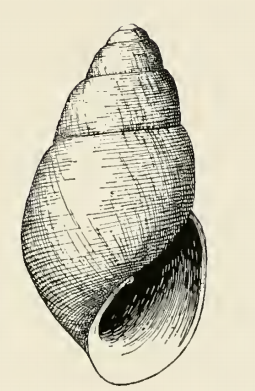
- Drawing of the shell

Scientific classification
- Kingdom: Animalia
- Phylum: Mollusca
- Class: Gastropoda
- Family: Pyramidellidae
- Genus: Odostomia
- Species: O. unalaskensis

Binomial name
- Odostomia unalaskensis Dall & Bartsch, 1909

Synonyms
- Evalea unalaskensis (Dall & Bartsch, 1909); Odostomia (Evalea) unalaskensis Dall & Bartsch, 1909 (basionym)

= Odostomia unalaskensis =

Species of gastropod

Odostomia unalaskensis is a species of sea snail first described by William Healy Dall and Paul Bartsch in 1909. It is a marine gastropod mollusc in the family Pyramidellidae, the pyrams and their allies.

== Description ==
The light yellow shell has an elongate-ovate shape and is stout and strong. Its length measures 4.5 mm. (The whorls of the protoconch are decollated.) The 5 1/2 whorls of the teleoconch are flattened on their outer three-fourths, rounding suddenly to the closely appressed summit, on the posterior fourth. The entire surface of the shell is marked by lines of growth and numerous equal and equally spaced, well marked spiral striations, of which about 28 occur between the sutures of the penultimate whorl. The sutures are well impressed. The periphery of the body whorl is somewhat angulated. The base of the shell is elongated, rounded, and marked like the spire. The aperture is ovate, and slightly effuse anteriorly. The posterior angle is acute. The outer lip is thin. The columella is short, strongly curved and reflected. It is reinforced for the greater part by the attenuated base and provided with a strong oblique fold at its insertion. The parietal wall is covered by a thin callus.

== Distribution ==
The type species was found off Unalaska, Alaska.
