= Mount Newhall =

Summit in Alaska, United States

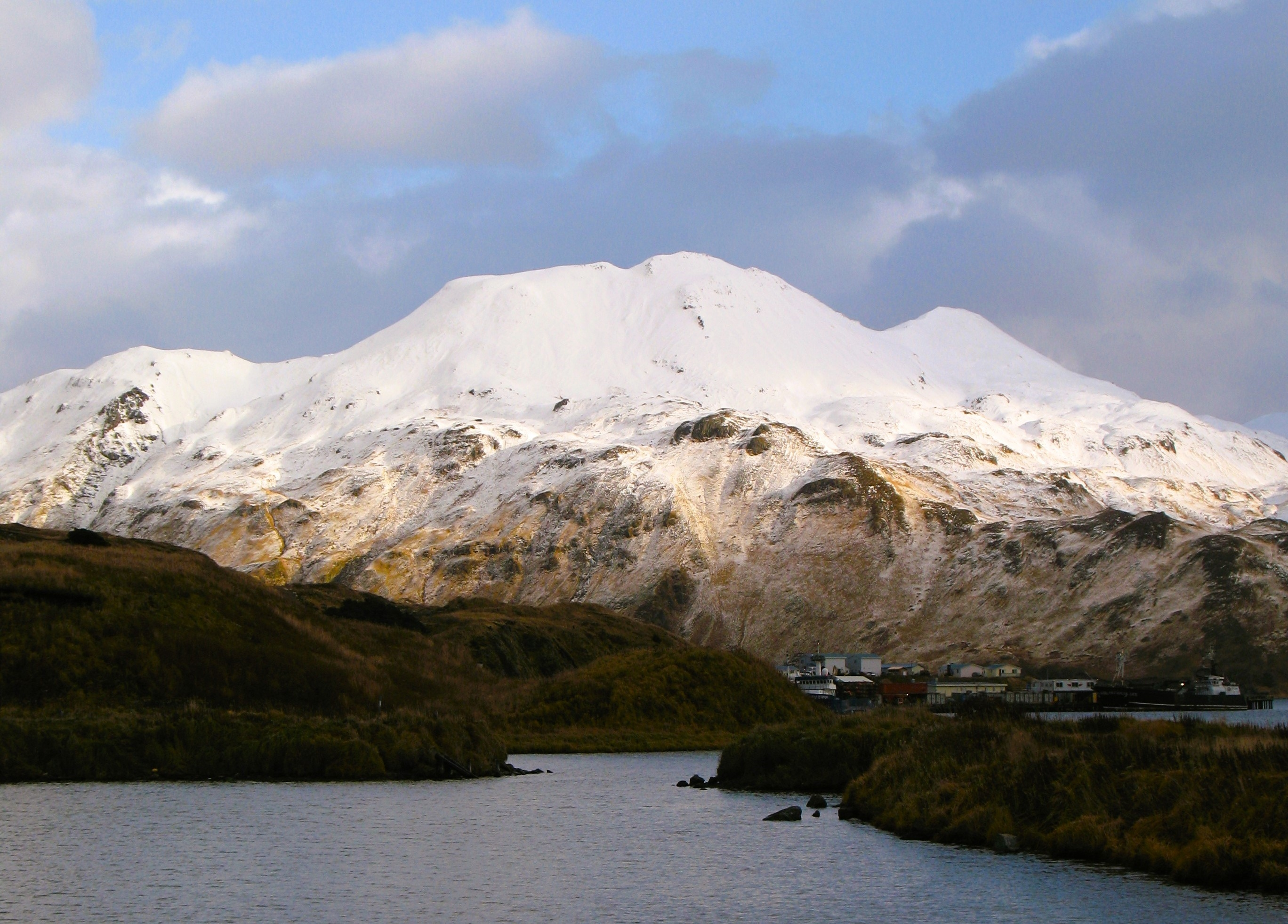
- West aspect

Highest point
- Elevation: 1,916 ft (584 m)
- Prominence: 1,166 ft (355 m)
- Parent peak: Peak 2353
- Isolation: 2.67 mi (4.30 km)
- Coordinates: 53°52′23″N 166°29′01″W

Naming
- Etymology: Dr. A. W. Newhall

Geography
- Location within Alaska
- Interactive map of Mount Newhall
- Location: Aleutians West Census Area
- Country: United States
- State: Alaska
- Protected area: Alaska Maritime National Wildlife Refuge
- Parent range: Aleutian Range
- Topo map: USGS Unalaska C-2

Geology
- Rock type: Andesitic

Mount Newhall is a 1,916-foot-elevation (584-meter) summit in Alaska, United States.

== Description ==
Mount Newhall is a landmark of the Dutch Harbor area set 2.25 miles (3.62 km) east of Unalaska on Unalaska Island of the Aleutian Islands. Mount Newhall is part of the Aleutian Range. Precipitation runoff from the mountain drains into Iliuliuk Bay. Topographic relief is significant as the summit rises over 1,900 feet (579 meters) above tidewater in approximately 1.3 miles (2.1 km). The mountain's toponym was a local name published in 1951 on an U.S. Geological Survey map and has been officially adopted by the United States Board on Geographic Names. Dr. Albert Warren Newhall (1872–1929) and his wife Agnes were early residents of Unalaska who managed the Jesse Lee Home in Unalaska in the late 1800s and early 1900s. He was the local physician, dentist, and minister.

== Climate ==
According to the Köppen climate classification system, Mount Newhall is located in a subpolar oceanic climate zone with cold, snowy winters, and cool summers. Winter temperatures can drop to 0 °F with wind chill factors below −10 °F.

== Gallery ==
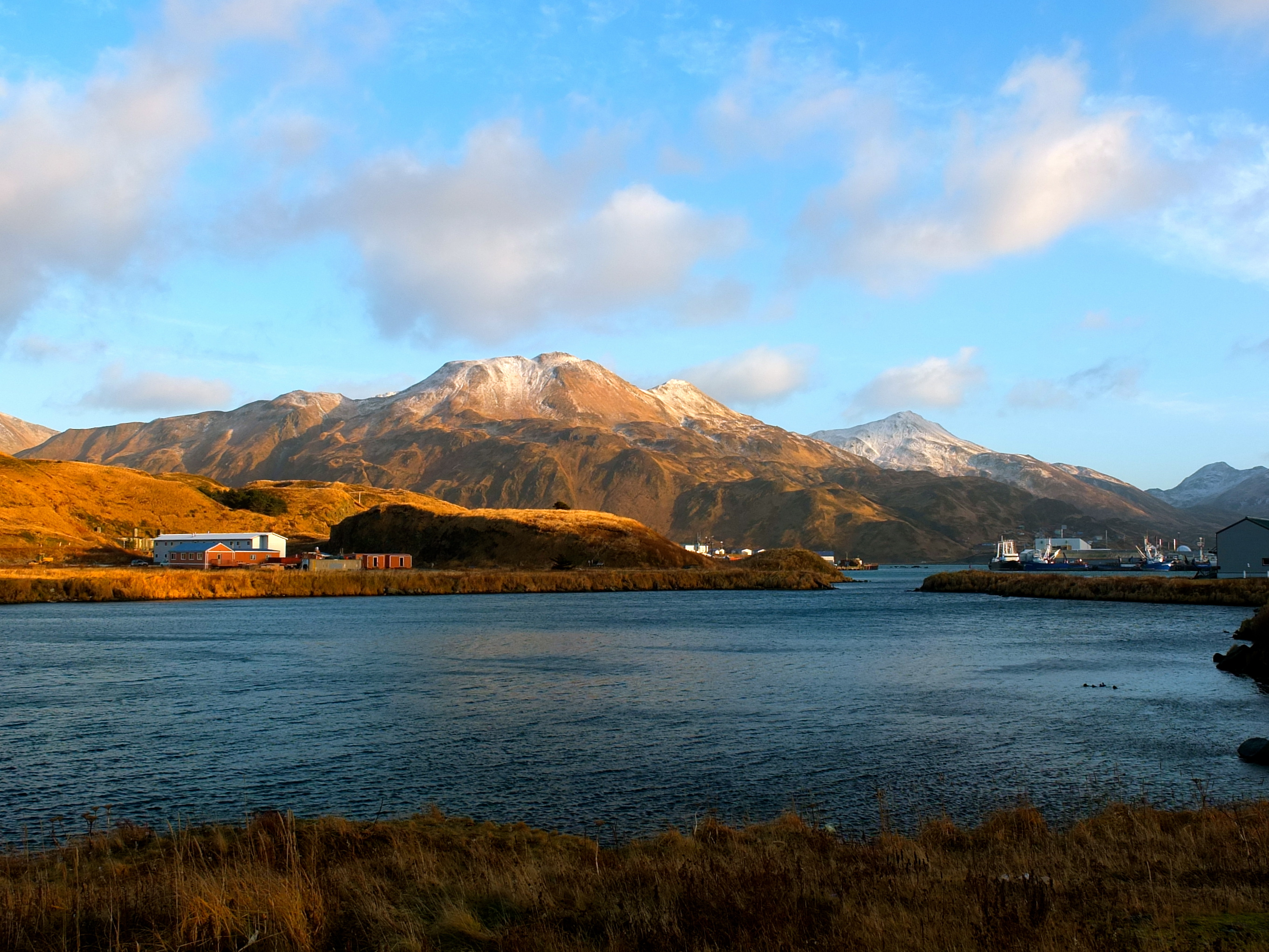
Mt. Newhall

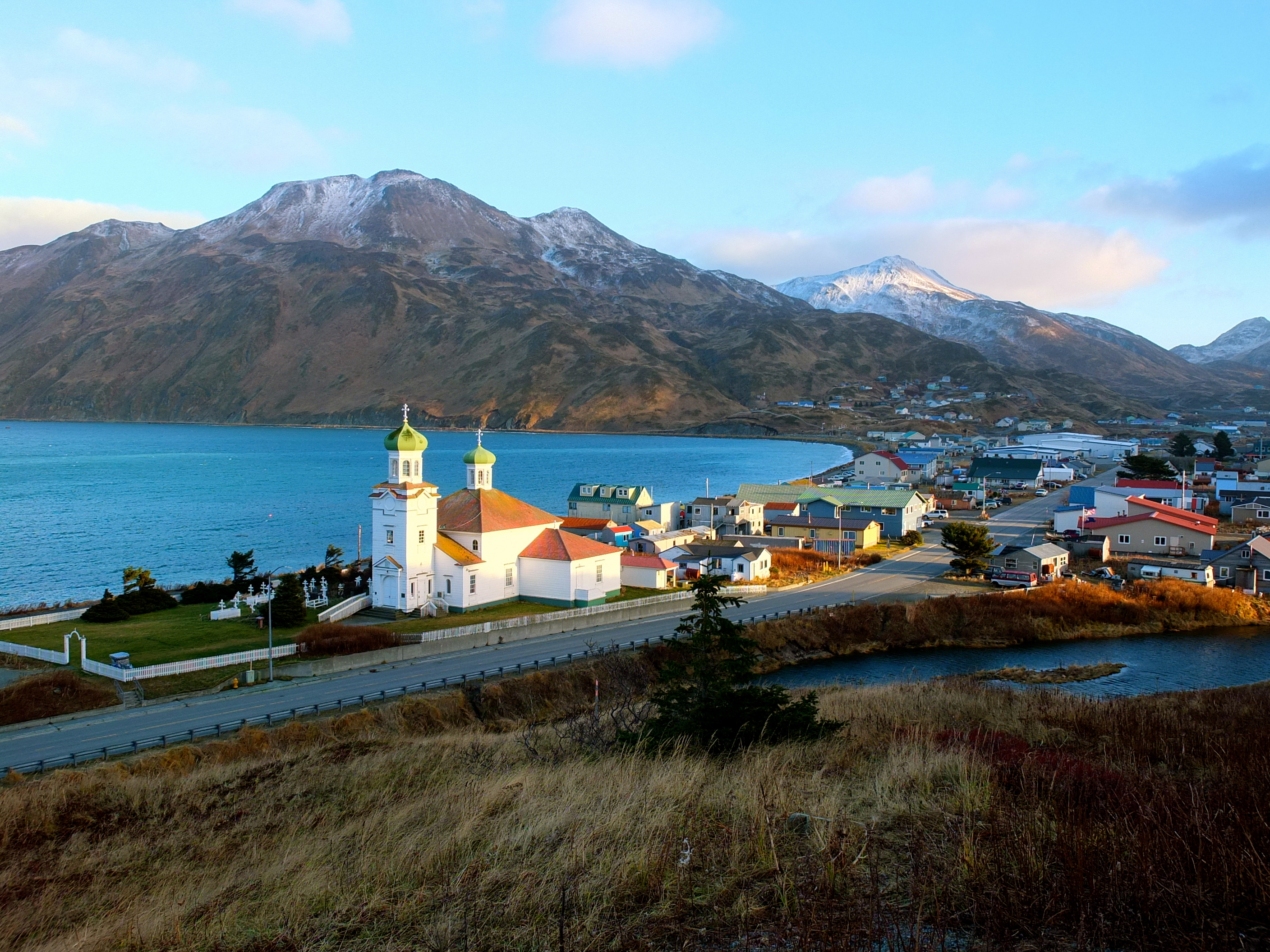
Mt. Newhall (left) and Unalaska

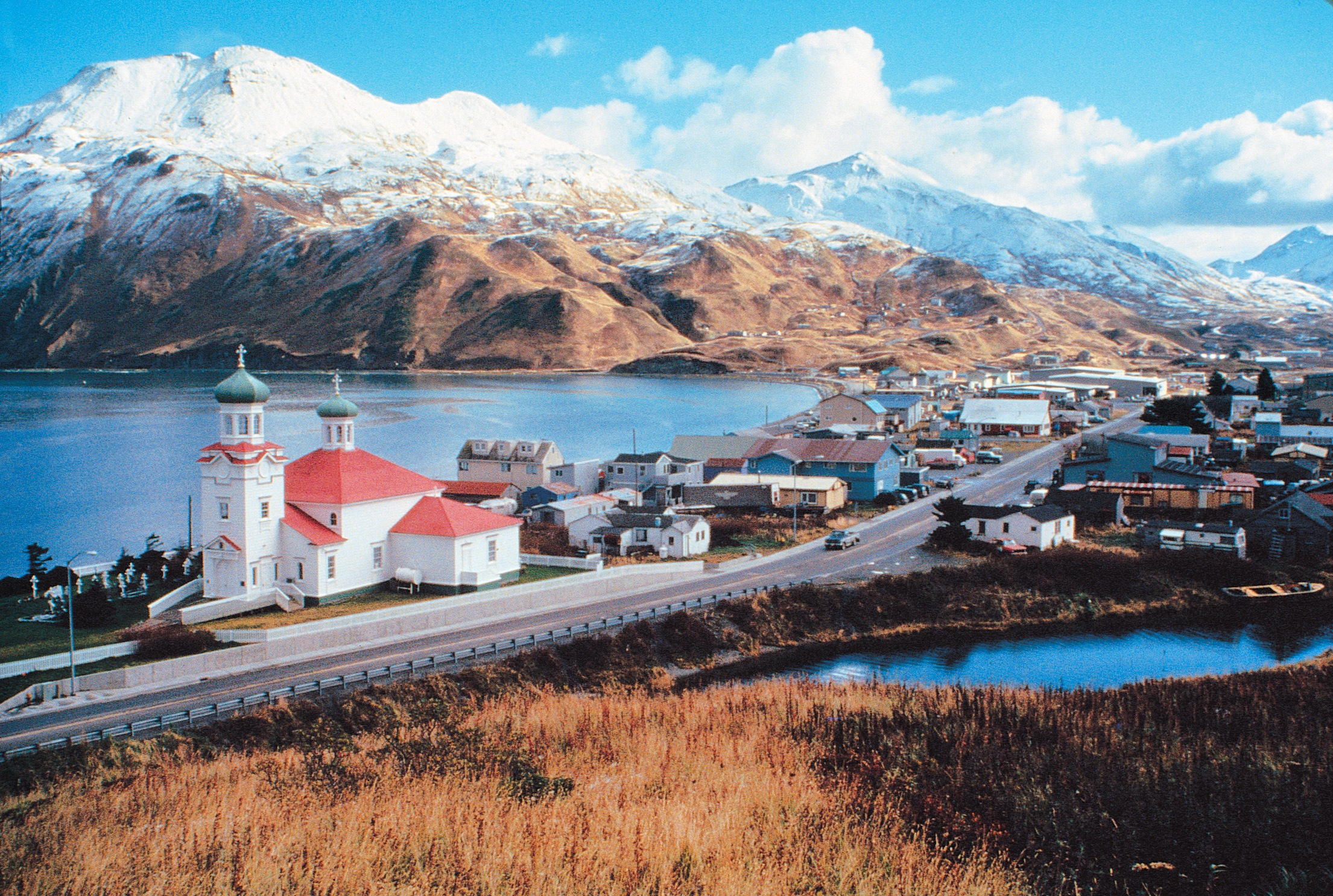
Newhall (left) and Unalaska

== See also ==
- Mount Ballyhoo
- Pyramid Peak (Unalaska Island)
