= Unalaska Bay =

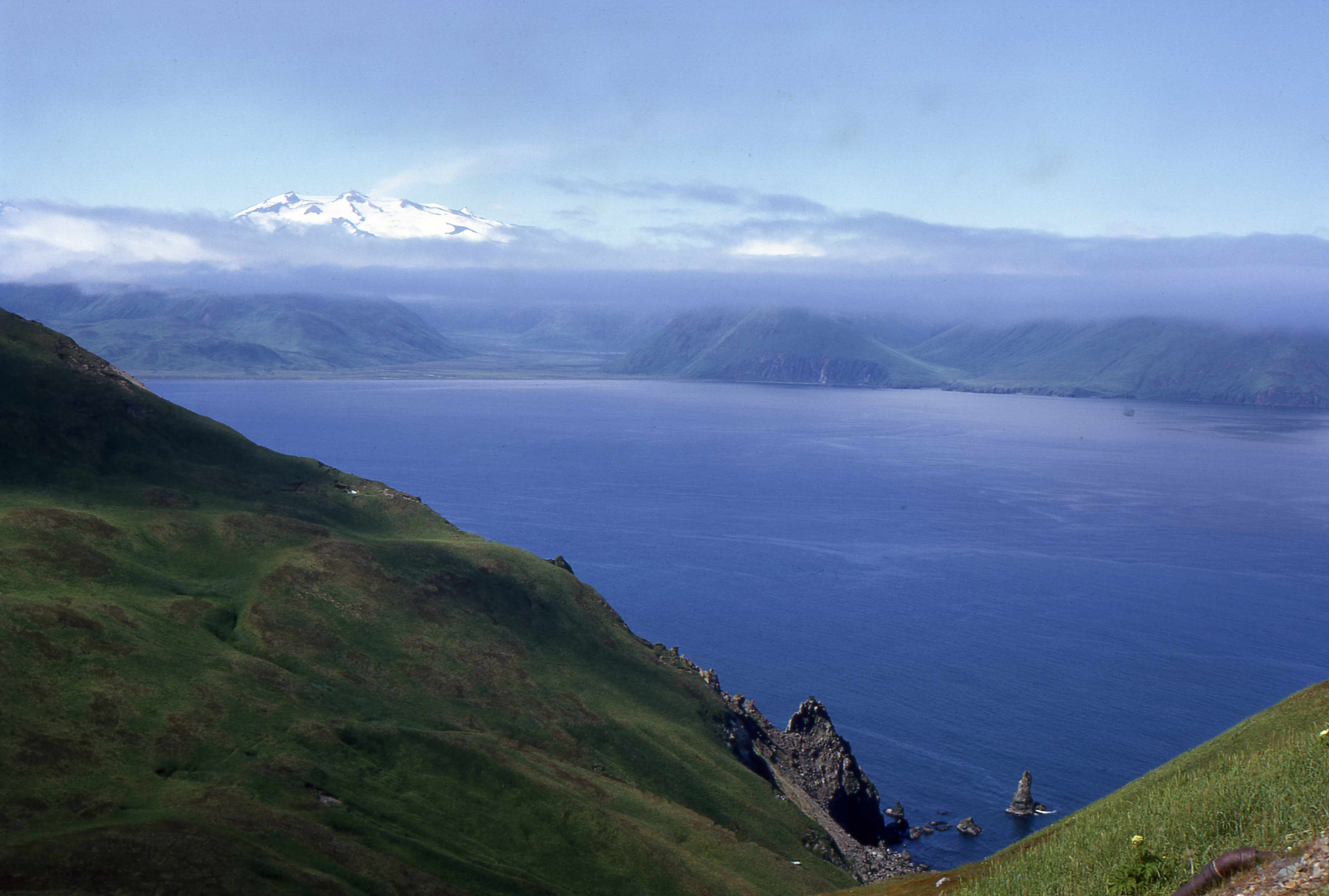
- Broad Bay and the Makushin Volcano partly hidden by low clouds and the Makushin valley.

- Location within Alaska
- Coordinates: 53°56′55″N 166°29′54″W
- Type: Bay
- Ocean/sea sources: Pacific Ocean
- Basin countries: United States
- Max. length: n/a
- Max. width: n/a
- Surface area: n/a
- Settlements: Dutch Harbor; Unalaska

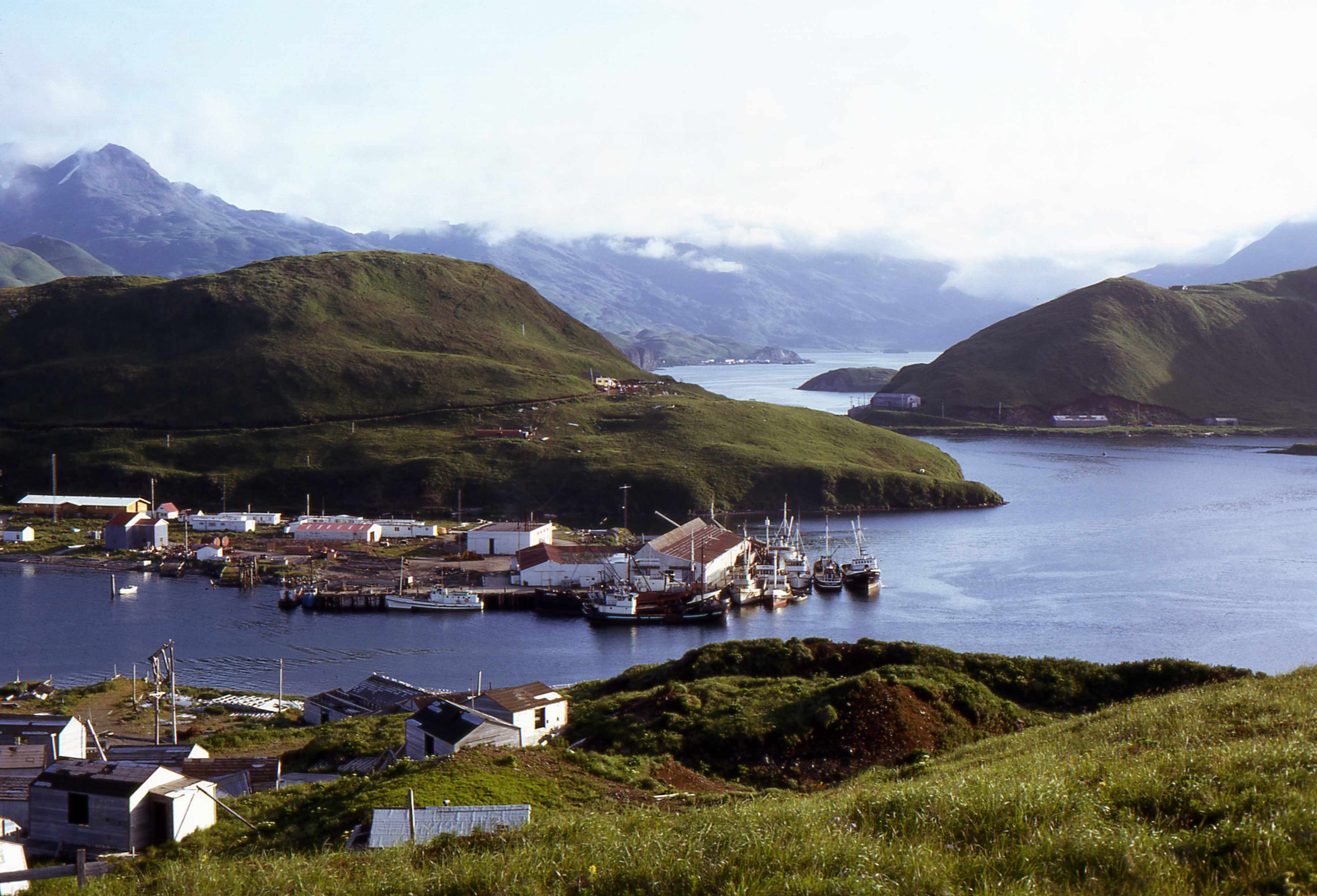
The East Channel separates Unalaska Island, with the fishing boats berthed, from Amaknak Island. On the right side is Iliukliuk Harbor, the South Channel and Captains Bay in the background.

Unalaska Bay is a waterway of Unalaska Island in the U.S. state of Alaska. It is situated below the eastern slopes of Makushin Volcano. Composed of seven individual bays, Unalaska Bay opens onto the Bering Sea.

== Description ==
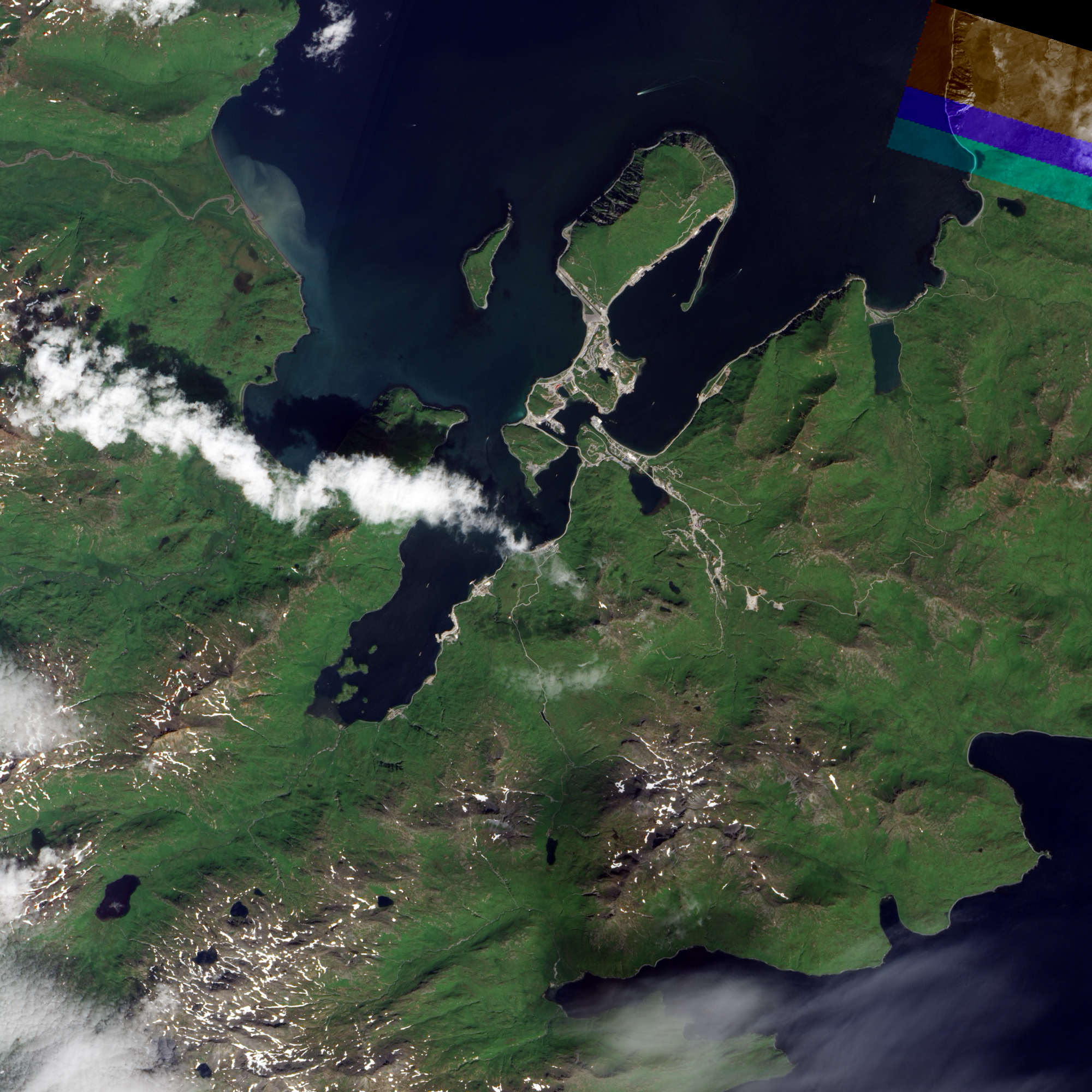
Dutch Harbor from outer space.

Unalaska Bay is the general name of the indentation making in to the north end of Unalaska Island between Cape Kalekhta and Cape Cheerful. Commercially, it was the most important bay in western Alaska in the beginning of the 20th century. Its shores are generally mountainous with precipitous sea faces. Amaknak Island lies in its southern end. Westward of the island the water is deep, but there is no good harbor in this part of the bay; eastward of the island are the important anchorages of Dutch Harbor, Iliuliuk Bay, and Iliuliuk Harbor. The channel to Iliuliuk Bay and Dutch Harbor is free from dangers except along the shores. Iliuliuk Harbor is obstructed at its entrance by ledges.

Cape Cheerful, the western point at the entrance to Unalaska Bay, is made up of bold, very high headlands, rounded on top, and intersected by deep, grassy valleys. The shore is free from dangers and has deep water close-to. A cascade, 125 feet high, south of Cape Cheerful, is a conspicuous mark from the vicinity of Cape Kalekhta, and is useful in thick weather when only the lower part of the land can be seen.

Ulakhta Head, 900 feet high, the north end of Amaknak Island, is, in clear weather, one of the best landmarks for fixing the position of Unalaska Bay. In appearance it is like a pyramid with the top cut off. The top shows perfectly flat, and there is no other headland or mountain in this vicinity that has this feature. It is not as high as the background, but shows up well against it, and can be made out at a long distance from the bay. From its northwest point a reef extends off | mile, marked by Needle Rock, similar in appearance to Priest Rock, but not so large. From its northeast point a long, narrow sand spit extends to the southward l£ miles; its southern end, called Spithead, is marked by a beacon, about 15 feet high, standing close to its southern shore.

Princess Head, 2 miles from Cape Kalekhta, is a large square-headed rock that projects from the shore far enough to be distinctly observed, even in thick weather, in following along the east shore.

Constantine Bay, about 4 miles from Cape Kalekhta, is obstructed by numerous rocky ledges, many of which are only evident from the attached kelp. It is of no importance and should be avoided by all vessels.

Summer Bay, the large, shallow bight, 3 miles from Constantine Bay and opposite Ulakhta Head, is shoal, and its shores are lined with kelp-marked rocks and ledges. At its southern headland is Pinnacle Rock, about 60 feet high. This bay is an excellent place to seine for salmon. The bay should be avoided by vessels.

Iliuliuk Bay extends from Pinnacle Rock and Ulakhta Head to Iliuliuk. To the northward of Spithead there is a ridge extending across the bay, having a least depth of 10 fathoms. South of this ridge the depths increase to 16 and 19 fathoms. There is anchorage anywhere in the bay. The usual anchorage is at the head in 14 to 16 fathoms, muddy bottom, where, even with northerly winds, the force of the sea does not seem to reach home. At the head of Iliuliuk Bay, behind the village, there is a distinct ravine or break in the mountains, which extends through to the water to the southward. This is a useful guide for entering the bay and inner harbor.

The portion south-southwestward of Amaknak Island is the long narrow inlet of Captains Bay. There is a narrow passage from it to Iliuliuk Harbor. On the western side of Unalaska Bay are Nateekin Bay, Broad Bay, and Eider Point Anchorage.

== Sailing directions ==
When bound for Unalaska Bay from any part of Bering Sea, it is recommended to shape the course for Cape Cheerful. In thick weather it is better to fall to the westward of Cape Cheerful and then round it than to fall to the eastward of it and get down among the passes. Makushin Volcano, 5,474 feet high, can generally be seen in clear weather, and is very prominent. An extinct crater,

2,314 feet high, back of Cape Cheerful and west of Eider Point, gives a distinct point for which to steer until close enough to distinguish the surrounding features. On getting close to the island, when the fog hangs over the land but leaves a clear space just along the water's edge, Wislow Island forms a good landmark. It is a very small, rounded island, regular in shape, and stands off far enough from the land to be distinctly seen as not a part of the main island. To the westward, under similar conditions, Makushin Cape can be seen at times. The land slopes gently to the cape from Makushin Volcano, and ends in a small, peak-like formation at the end of the cape. From the eastward the cascade south of Cape Cheerful is also useful. Strangers, when in the vicinity and uncertain of the identity of the bay and its landmarks, should endeavor to pick out Ulakhta Head. Looking into the bay, its flat top breaking off abruptly to sloping sides presents an appearance unlike any other in the vicinity, and shows up well against the background of mountains.

== Dangers ==
Navigators should avoid the kelp, which invariably indicates a rocky bottom. A large cluster of rocks, mostly awash, and usually marked by breakers, extends nearly 200 yards (180 m) to the westward of the south head of Constantine Bay. Pinnacle Rock is surrounded by reefs, awash and under water, for a distance of 300 yards (270 m). Between Pinnacle Rock and a point opposite the entrance to Dutch Harbor the east shore is lined with rocks, and should not be approached closer than 4 miles (6.4 km). The spit has a kelp-marked shoal on its east side which extends its whole length; at its middle point the shoal extends 4 miles (6.4 km) from shore. Spithead is bold-to, and may be safely approached as close as 150 yards (140 m). There is a beacon, about 15 feet high, standing close to its southern shore. Rocky Point has a kelp-marked reef which extends toward Spithead about 350 yards (320 m); eastward of the point shoal water makes out about 200 yards (180 m) with little kelp. The northern extremity of the reef is marked by a buoy painted white. From Rocky Point south, the shore of Amaknak Island should not be approached closer than 300 yards (270 m). Iliuliuk Reef consists of a ledge of rocks, portions of which are always exposed, extending in an east and west direction for 250 yards (230 m). From the eastern dry rock a ledge, marked by kelp, extends south by east-southeast 150 yards (140 m). The southern extremity of this ledge is sometimes marked by a buoy. Tuscarora Rock, marked by kelp, lies about 50 yards (46 m) south-southeast by east. from the southern extremity of Iliuliuk Reef. It is small and generally marked by an iron barrel buoy. These buoys were maintained by the Alaska Commercial Company.
