= MV Selendang Ayu =

Panamax bulk cargo ship

Coordinates: 53.6395°N 167.1278°W

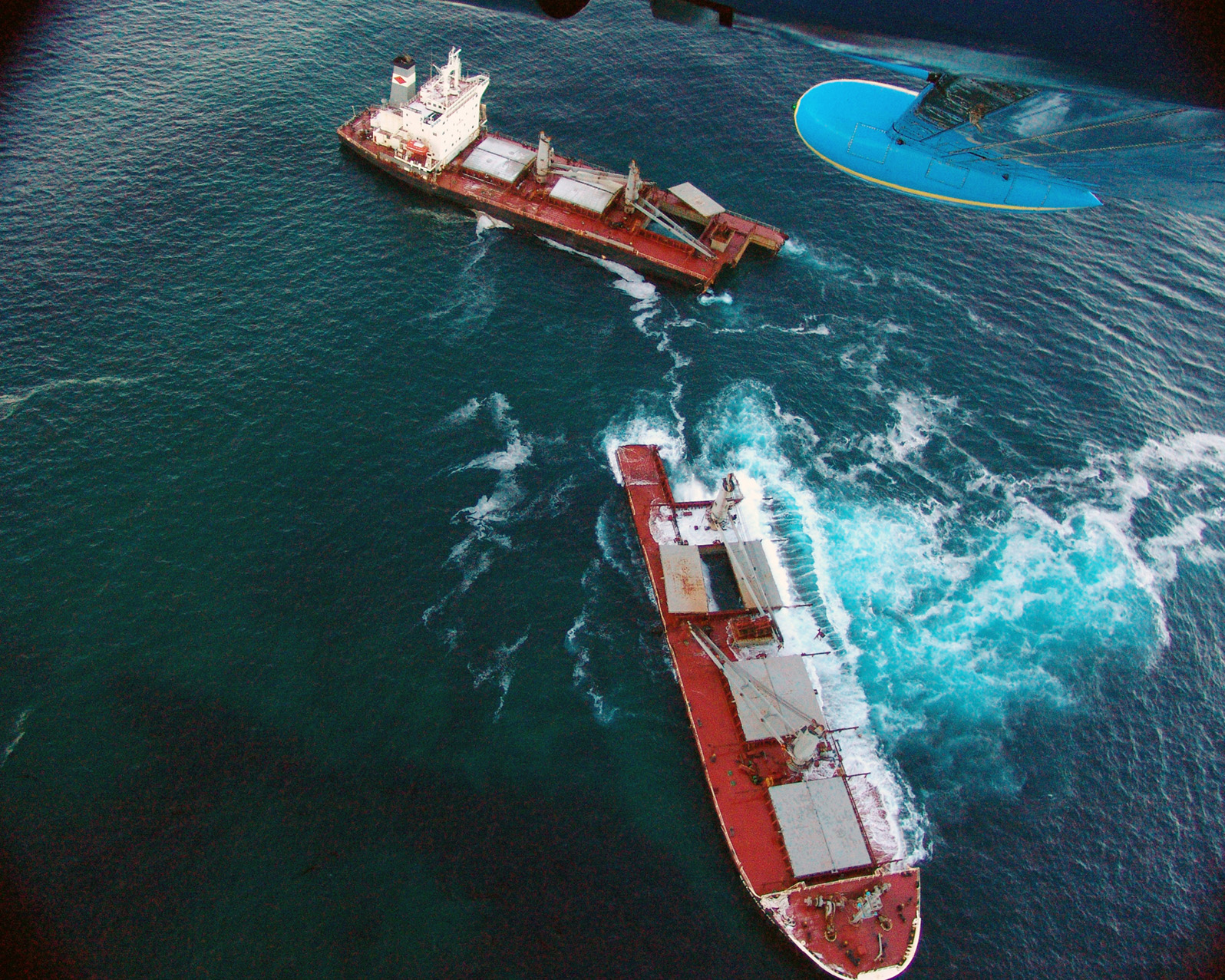
- Selendang Ayu after breaking in two

History

Malaysia
- Name: Selendang Ayu
- Builder: Hudong, Shanghai
- In service: 1998
- Out of service: 2004
- Identification: IMO number: 9145528
- Fate: Broke up 8 December 2004, off Unalaska Island

General characteristics
- Class & type: Panamax
- Tonnage: 39,775 GT
- Length: 738 ft (225 m)
- Installed power: 11,542 hp (8,607 kW)
- Speed: 14.5 knots (26.9 km/h; 16.7 mph)
- Crew: 26

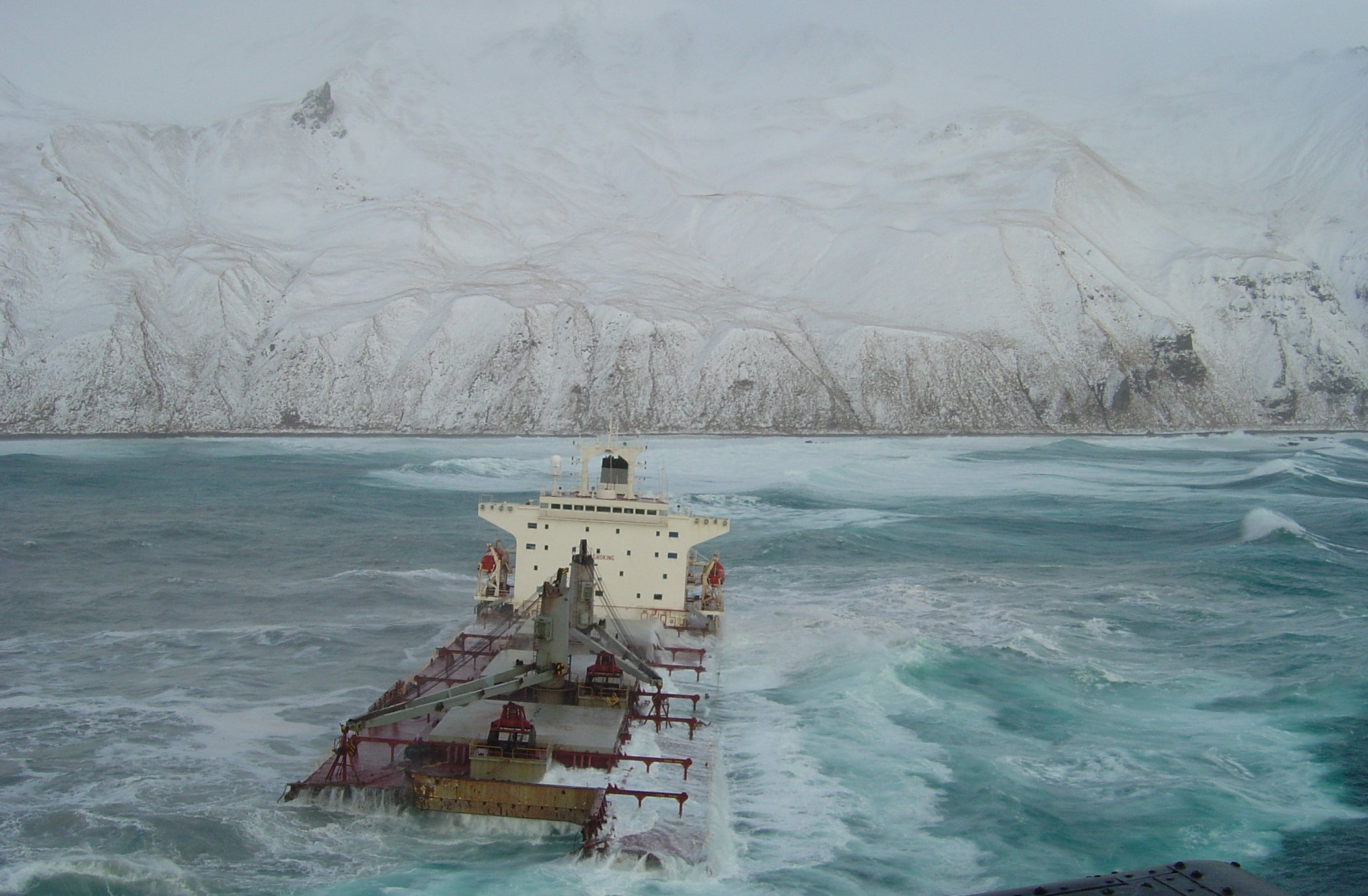
Selendang Ayu off Unalaska Island

MV Selendang Ayu, IMO number: 9145528, was a Malaysian-registered Panamax bulk cargo ship chartered by the IMC Group. It ran aground off Unalaska Island in western Alaska's Aleutian Islands on 8 December 2004 after its engine failed. Six crew members died when a rescue helicopter was engulfed by a breaking wave; the ship broke in two, resulting in a large oil spill.

== Final voyage ==
On 28 November 2004, Selendang Ayu left Seattle, Washington, bound for Xiamen, China. On board was a cargo of 60,200 tonnes (66,400 tons) of soybeans, along with 1,000 tonnes (1,100 tons) of fuel oil. Arrival in China was scheduled for 17 December but the ship was running at reduced speed due to high winds and heavy seas.

After the ship had sailed through Unimak Pass, the ship's engine malfunctioned and was shut down, at around noon on 6 December. At this point, the ship was 46 miles (74 km) north-west of Bogoslof Island and around 100 miles (160 km) from Dutch Harbor, the nearest port. The cause of the engine failure was found to be a cracked liner in the no. 3 cylinder and the ship's engineers decided to isolate that cylinder, restart the engine using the five remaining cylinders and sail to Dutch Harbor, where the defective cylinder could be repaired. By 21:00, the no. 3 cylinder had been isolated but the engine could not be restarted. At this time, the wind was Beaufort force 8, from the north-west, and the ship was drifting towards land at about 1.6 knots (3.0 km/h; 1.8 mph).

The following morning, it was discovered that four of the engine's cylinders also had cracked piston rings. It was decided to replace the worst of these and make another attempt to restart the engine. By now, the sustained wind speed was around 30 knots (56 km/h; 35 mph) and the ship was drifting at 1.8 knots (3.3 km/h; 2.1 mph) in 15 foot (4.6 m) seas.

At 11:00, the US Coast Guard cutter Alex Haley arrived on the scene and was standing by. The no. 6 cylinder head, weighing 3,300 pounds (1,500 kg) was removed and lashed to the deck but worsening weather and the ship's roll prevented any more work on the engine for the next 18 hours. Fuel was transferred to inboard tanks to reduce the likelihood of a spill if the ship should run aground. During the afternoon, the ship drifted past Bogoslof Island at a distance of around 3 miles (4.8 km). The ocean-going tug Sidney Foss arrived after sunset at 18:30 and a line was attached. However, with winds now at 45–55 knots (83–102 km/h; 52–63 mph) and waves of 25 feet (7.6 m), the tug was only able to slow the vessel's drift.

A second tug, James Dunlap was hired from Dutch Harbor, with the intention of attaching a towline from the tug to Selendang Ayu's stern so the stricken freighter could be turned to face into the wind, allowing it to be towed away from Unalaska Island. However, soon after James Dunlap arrived, the tow-line from Sidney Foss parted at 07:30 on 8 December and the weather made it impossible to re-establish the tow. At 11:15, the ship passed into water shallow enough for its anchors to be used. One anchor was dropped and this halted the ship for around an hour, until the wind worsened and the ship began to drift towards the shore again. The starboard anchor could not be lowered as the port anchor had wrapped around the bow of the ship. Alex Haley tried to attach a towline to turn the ship and allow the second anchor to be dropped but this also failed.

== Rescue ==
Two HH-60J Jayhawk helicopters had been sent from Coast Guard Air Station Kodiak to Cold Bay to rescue Selendang Ayu's crew, if necessary. At 14:00 on 8 December, the first of these helicopters began to winch nine of the ship's crew from the deck and, 50 minutes later, began to lower them to the deck of Alex Haley while the second Jayhawk began to pick up nine more crew members and transferred them ashore.

This left seven senior officers and one deck cadet on board the ship, which had now managed to lower its starboard anchor. Work on the engine continued but the ship ran aground at 17:05. One of the Jayhawks returned to evacuate the remaining crew and, by 18:15, only the master and a Coast Guard rescue swimmer were still to be lifted off the ship. A rogue wave broke over the ship's bow and the helicopter was engulfed in spray. Its engines flamed out from water ingestion and the helicopter crashed into the sea and sank. Alex Haley's HH-65B Dolphin was airborne and was able to rescue the three members of the Jayhawk's crew but only one of the seven members of the ship's crew. There was no sign of the remaining six men so the Dolphin took the rescued crew ashore. At 19:15, Selendang Ayu broke in two; the master and the Coast Guard swimmer were safely recovered at 20:35.

Two crewmembers of the Dolphin helicopter, CGNR 6513, were decorated for their actions in this rescue: AST3 Aaron Bean with the Meritorious Service Medal and AMT3 Gregory Gibbons with the Distinguished Flying Cross. The Coast Guard searched unsuccessfully for the remaining crew until their efforts were called off on 10 December.

== Impact ==
The ship had been carrying a significant amount of fuel, so there were fears that Selendang Ayu could create the worst Alaskan oil spill since Exxon Valdez. One tank containing 40,131 US gallons (151,910 L) of fuel ruptured when the ship broke apart. It is estimated that 424,000 US gallons (1,610,000 L) of heavy bunker C fuel oil and 18,000 US gallons (68,000 L) of diesel fuel were on board when she grounded. Ultimately, 350,000 US gallons (1,300,000 L) of bunker oil and diesel spilled, which is about 2.9% of the volume of crude oil spilled from Exxon Valdez. The crew had transferred the fuel to internal tanks when the ship foundered, and heaters were turned off so that the fuel would thicken in the cold waters. However, environmental officials estimate that up to 1.28 million liters of thick fuel oil (338,000 US gallons (1,280,000 L)) leaked from the freighter.

The carcasses of over 1,600 birds and 6 sea otters were recovered from beaches along the western shore of Unalaska Island after the spill.
