= Makushin Volcano =

Ice-covered stratovolcano on Unalaska island in the Aleutian islands, Alaska, U.S.

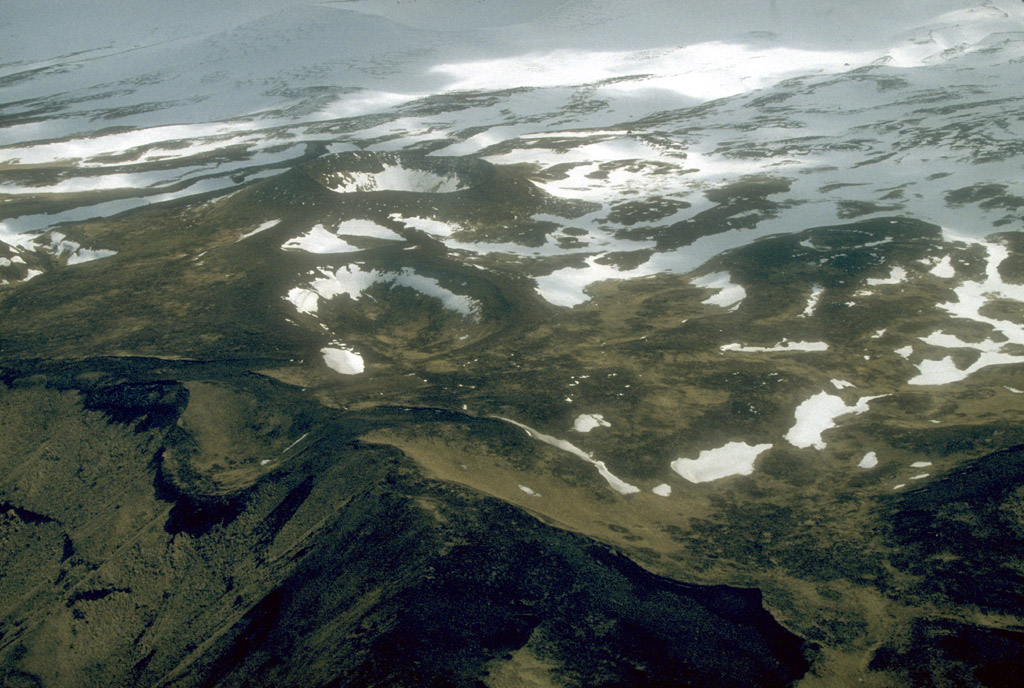
- Aerial view of the Point Kadin vents, a series of post- glacial explosion pits and small cinder cones that occur along a fracture zone northwest of the summit of Makushin Volcano

Highest point
- Elevation: 2,036 m (6,680 ft)
- Prominence: 2,036 m (6,680 ft)
- Listing: Highest ocean islands 74th; US most prominent peaks 69th
- Coordinates: 53°53′11″N 166°55′52″W

Geography
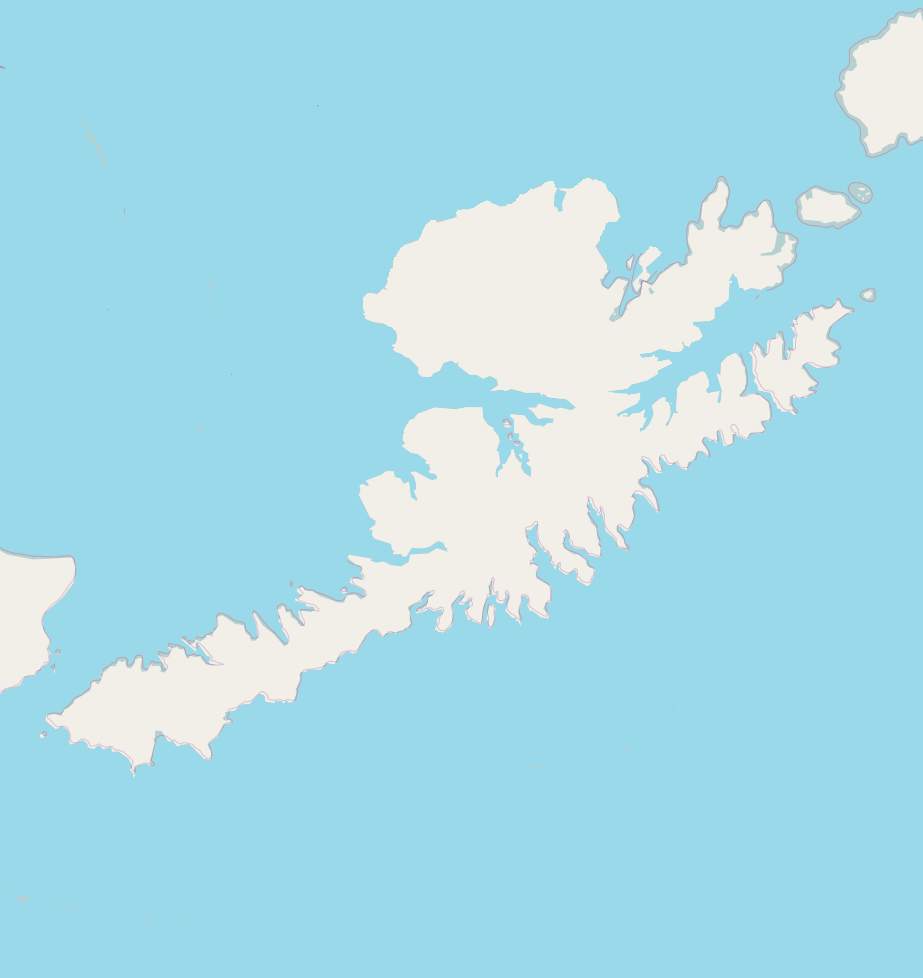
- Location within Unalaska Location within Alaska
- Location: Unalaska Island, Alaska, U.S.
- Parent range: Aleutian Range
- Topo map: USGS Unalaska C-3

Geology
- Formed by: Subduction zone volcanism
- Rock age: Early Pliocene
- Mountain type(s): Stratovolcano with caldera and parasitic cone
- Volcanic arc: Aleutian Arc
- Last eruption: January 1995

Climbing
- First ascent: George Davidson in 1867

The Makushin Volcano (also known as Mount Makushin) is an ice-covered stratovolcano located on Unalaska Island in the Aleutian Islands of the U.S. state of Alaska. With an elevation of 2,036 meters (6,680 ft), its summit is the highest point on the island. Makushin is one of the most active among the 52 historically active volcanoes of Alaska. It has erupted at least two dozen times over the past several thousand years, with the last eruption occurring in 1995.

== Etymology ==
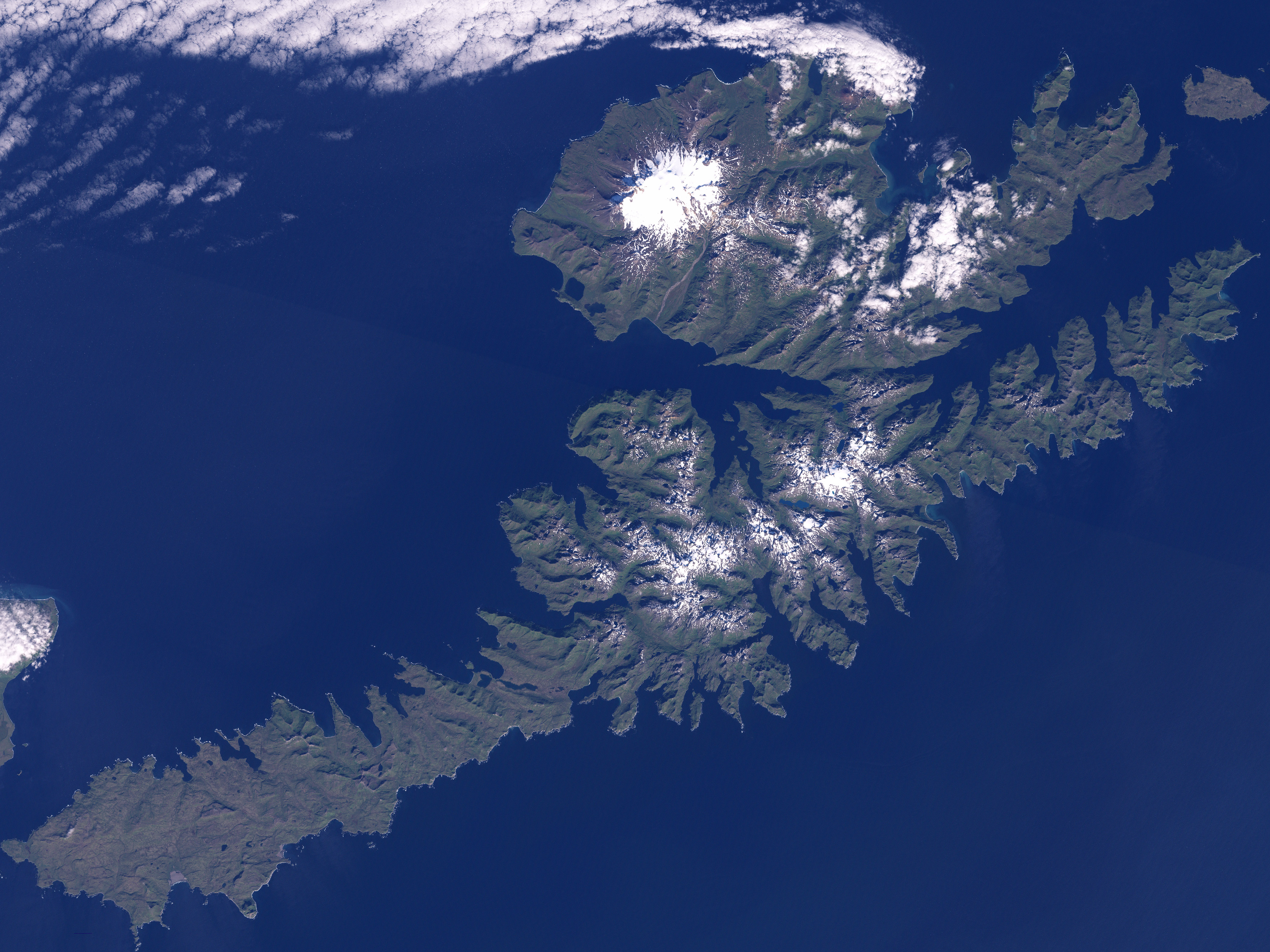
NASA satellite view of Unalaska Island. Makushin is the prominent white snowy area to the northwest

In 1792, Sarichev called the volcano "Ognedyshushchaya Gora" meaning "fire-breathing mountain", i.e. volcano in Russian. In 1825, it was known as Makuschkin Volcano, possibly from the Russian word makushka, meaning "the top (of the head)". Its native name was Aigagin, a derivative of the word Aigak in the native tongue of the Aleuts. Makushin was also the native village here on the northern shore of the Makushin Bay where the foreman or bidarshik of the Russian American Company lived. There were six huts (yourts) where 35 natives lived.

Alaska Volcano Observatory has identified "Ajagin Wesselow", "Makushin Volcano", "Ajagisch", "Makouchine", "Ognedieshutshai Gora", "Ayagsh", "Aiyagin", "Cheerful Mtn.", "Ayyagyh", "Ayagish", "Makuschkin Volcano", "Ognedyshushchaya Gora" and "Makishinskaia sopka" as alternate names for the Makushin Volcano. Specifically identified here are the four features namely, Red Cinder Dome, Pakushin cone, the Sugarloaf and the Point Kadin vents.

== History ==
=== Origins ===
The history of the volcano has been identified with the early Pliocene age. However, the caldera of the volcano is dated to a comparatively recent history of 8000 years. The “Sugarloaf cone on the ENE flank, and a cluster of about a dozen explosion pits and cinder cones at Point Kadin on the WNW flank” is attributed to the Holocene age.

According to the history recorded by the Alaska Volcano Observatory: “The first episode began in Pliocene or early Pleistocene time (the oldest known age of lavas is 0.93 Ma [Nye, 1990]) and produced extensive flows and subordinate pyroclastic deposits of basaltic and andesitic composition, which enlarged the island by several kilometers along the northwest coast. Radial dips of flows suggest that Makushin Volcano itself was the principal vent area. The older flows are extensively glaciated, which implies a minimum age of late Pleistocene. The summit of Makushin subsequently collapsed, forming a summit caldera. Andesitic pyroclastic-flow and debris flow deposits occur in glaciated valleys on the north and south sides of the volcano indicating a Holocene age for the caldera-forming eruption."

=== Activity ===
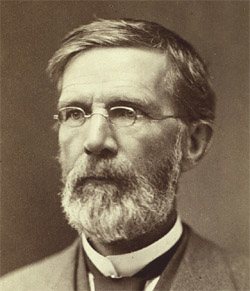
English born American geographer George Davidson in 1867 who conducted some important geographical and geological research into the volcano and the Makushin valley.

Historically, Makushin is one of the most active volcanoes in the Aleutian Islands, erupting at least two dozen times over the past several thousands years, the last in 1995. Seventeen explosions or eruptions of the Makushin Volcano have been recorded since 1786, though the magnitude has been termed as “small-to-moderate”. These were recorded in the years 1768–69, 1790?, 1792?, 1802, 1818?, 1826–38?, 1844?, 1865, 1867?, 1883, 1907, 1912?, 1926, 1938, 1951, 1952?, 1980, 1987 and 1995. Makushin's pinnacle last erupted on January 30, 1995, which generated ash extending to an altitude of 2.5 km. In the 1987 eruption, which occurred on March 2, the plume rose to 900 meters (3,000 ft) above the volcano. The 1980 eruption was comparatively of smaller magnitude emanating from a vent on the southern side about 60 meters (200 ft) below the volcanic peak.

Although the volcano has not erupted since 1995, studies conducted between July 1996 and August 2000 recorded some 176 minor earthquakes registering between 0.1 and 3.2 on the Richter Scale, occurring on average 2 to 3 times a month. The hypocenters of the earthquakes generally occur in two cluster areas, the first is the larger and more active, located about 6 kilometers (3.7 mi) southeast of the summit of the volcano at depths ranging from 2–9 kilometers (1.2–5.6 mi) and the second, about 24 kilometers (15 mi) east of the summit under Unalaska Bay occurs at depths of 6–14 kilometers (3.7–8.7 mi).

The volcano was climbed by English born American geographer George Davidson in 1867 who conducted some important geographical and geological research into the volcano area and the Makushin valley.

== Geography ==
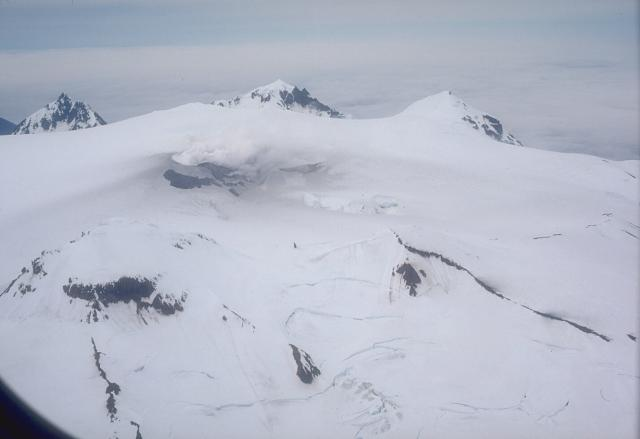
Makushin Volcano in 1982

Mount Makushin is located on the northern Unalaska Island, which is situated to the west of the town of Dutch Harbor. The Unalaska Bay, which is 10 kilometers (6.2 mi) wide, separates the Dutch Harbor and Unalaska towns. The volcano is truncated, with a width of 16 kilometers (9.9 mi), forming the triangular northwest extension of the Unalaska Island. The caldera, which crowns the volcano, has a width of 2.5 kilometers (1.6 mi) (3 kilometers (1.9 mi) is also mentioned in another reference). Compared with the other Aleutian strato-volcanoes in the region, which have steep profiles, the Makushin volcano is a contrast that exhibits a broad and dome like structure with an ice field coverage of 40 km^{2} (15 mi^{2}). Fumaroles and hot springs in area form a roughly linear trend. About 8 kilometers (5.0 mi) to the south of this volcano is the “composite Pakushin cone” that has multiple craters, which is 4000 years old eruption; pyroclastic flows and surges have been reported here. The southeast flank of the volcano has rock exposures, at 975 meters (3,199 ft) elevation.

The pyroclastic flows deposited by the eruptions forming the Caldera have engulfed valleys in the eastern, northeastern, northern, and western valleys of the valley with depths up to 100 m. The northeast border of the volcano is also filled with volcanic lava, which is called the “Lava Ramp” spreading to an area of 50 km^{2} (19 mi^{2}). A subsidiary cone formed is the Pakushin Cone), on the south. In the east and southeast part of the volcano hot springs and fumaroles have been created, at the summit and in valleys. A valley of the same name stretches to the northeast of the volcano from Broad Bay in Captain's Bay and was identified as a glacial valley after a survey in 1873.

The terrain surrounding the volcano is very rugged but most of the surface surrounding the volcano is vegetated. However, it is generally less pronounced in the area of pyroclastic flows and deposits. Areas of short and tall grass grow in the volcano area, ranging from less than 20 cm high to over 1 meter.

John Muir, the Scottish-born American naturalist (1838–1914), in his book "The Cruise of the Corwin (1881)", has vividly described this volcano:

The noblest of them all was Makushin, about nine thousand feet high and laden with glaciers, a grand sight, far surpassing what I had been led to expect. There is a spot on its summit which is said to smoke, probably mostly steam and vapor from the infiltration of water into the heated cavities of the old volcano. The extreme summit of Makushin was wrapped in white clouds, and from beneath these the glaciers were seen descending impressively into the sunshine to within a thousand or fifteen hundred feet of sea-level. This fine mountain, glittering in its showy mail of snow and ice, together with a hundred other peaks dipping into the blue sky, and every one of them telling the work of ice or fire in their forms and sculpture—these, and the sparkling sea, and long inreaching fiords, are a noble picture to add to the thousand others which have enriched our lives this summer in the great Northland.

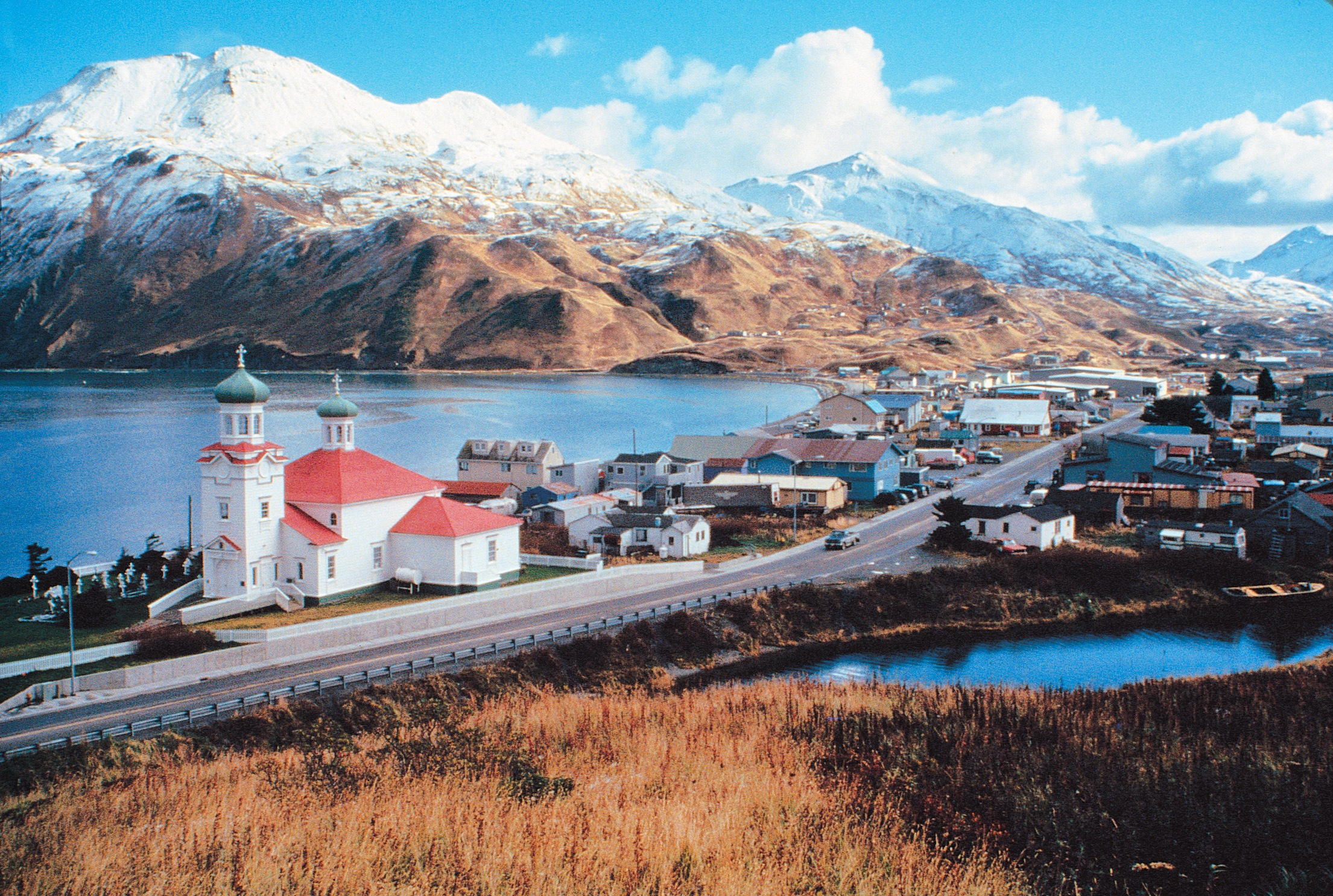
Unalaska town

The closest town to the Volcano is the Unalaska town which is located 1,280 kilometers (800 mi) from Anchorage on the Aleutian Archipelago at the northern end of the Island. It is situated on a well protected bay. This was at the cross roads of shipping and trade during Russian occupation (1741–1867). Dutch Harbor another important harbor town across the Unalaska town was a major naval base during the World War II. Fishing and crabbing industries have been the mainstay of the economy of Unalaska island.

== Research studies ==
The high-temperature geothermal resources study of volcanoes in Alaska has covered the geothermal areas in the summit caldera peak and also on the southeastern and eastern flanks of the Makushin. It is recorded as a subduction-related volcanic arc in the middle of the great Aleutian chain.

Energy resources from the geothermal reservoir beneath the volcano have been assessed in a study carried out by the Alaska Power Authority to meet the power demands of the town of Unalaska and the Dutch Harbor. The study has established that such an energy generation from the geothermal resources would be cheaper than the diesel power system existing on the island.

== See also ==
- List of mountain peaks of North America
  - List of mountain peaks of the United States
    - List of mountain peaks of Alaska
- List of Ultras of the United States
- List of volcanoes in the United States

== Sources ==
- Global Volcanism Program
- Volcanoes of the Alaska Peninsula and Aleutian Islands-Selected Photographs
- Alaska Volcano Observatory
- Volcanoes USGS
