= Unalaska Island =

Volcanic island in the Aleutian Islands, Alaska, United States

Unalaska
Native name: Nawan-Alaxsxa
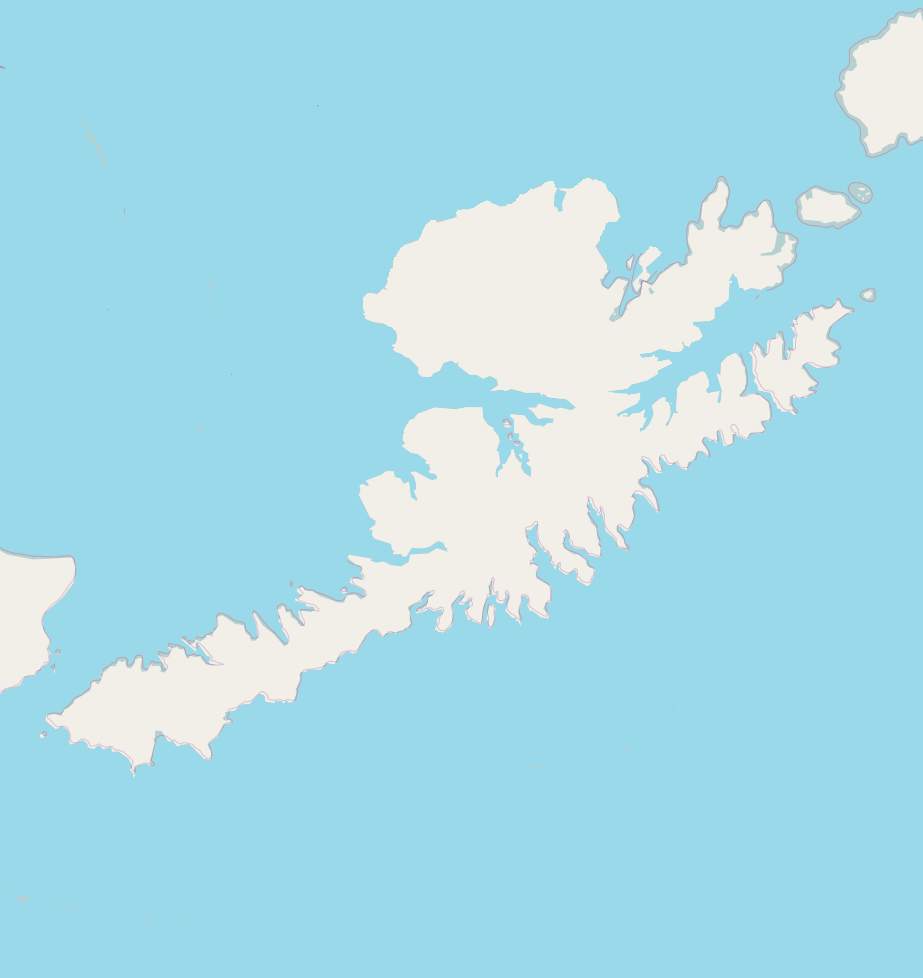
- Map of the island

- Location within Alaska

Geography
- Location: Aleutian island archipelago, United States and Russia
- Coordinates: 53°40′24″N 166°38′54″W
- Archipelago: Fox Islands
- Major islands: Unalaska
- Area: 1,051 sq mi (2,720 km^{2})
- Length: 128 km (79.5 mi)
- Width: 56 km (34.8 mi)
- Highest elevation: 6,680 ft (2036 m)
- Highest point: Mount Makushin

Administration
- United States
- State: Alaska
- Census Area: Aleutians West Census Area
- Largest settlement: Unalaska, Alaska (pop. 4432)

Demographics
- Population: 5,638 (2019)
- Pop. density: 1.83/km^{2} (4.74/sq mi)
- Ethnic groups: Aleut and other Native Alaskan groups

Unalaska (Aleut: Nawan-Alaxsxa; Russian: Уналашка) is a volcanic island in the Fox Islands group of the Aleutian Islands in the US state of Alaska located at 53°38′N 167°00′W. The island has a land area of 1,051 square miles (2,720 km^{2}). It measures 79.4 mi (127.8 km) long and 34.7 mi (55.8 km) wide. The city of Unalaska, Alaska, covers part of the island and all of neighboring Amaknak Island where the Port of Dutch Harbor is located. The population of the island excluding Amaknak as of the 2000 census was 1,759 residents.

Unalaska is the second-largest island in the Fox Islands group and the Aleutian Islands. The coastline of Unalaska is markedly different in appearance than other major Aleutian Islands, with numerous inlets and peninsulas. The irregular coastline is broken by three long deep bays, Beaver Inlet, Unalaska Bay, and Makushin Bay, as well as by numerous smaller bays and coves. Unalaska's terrain is rugged and covered with mountains, and during the greater part of the year, the higher elevations are covered with snow. The highest point on Unalaska is the active Makushin Volcano.

== Etymology ==
Several theories about the etymology of "Unalaska" exist; the most likely is that the name derives from the Russian word Ounalashka, an adaptation of the Aleut word for "near the mainland", nawan Alaskax.

== History ==
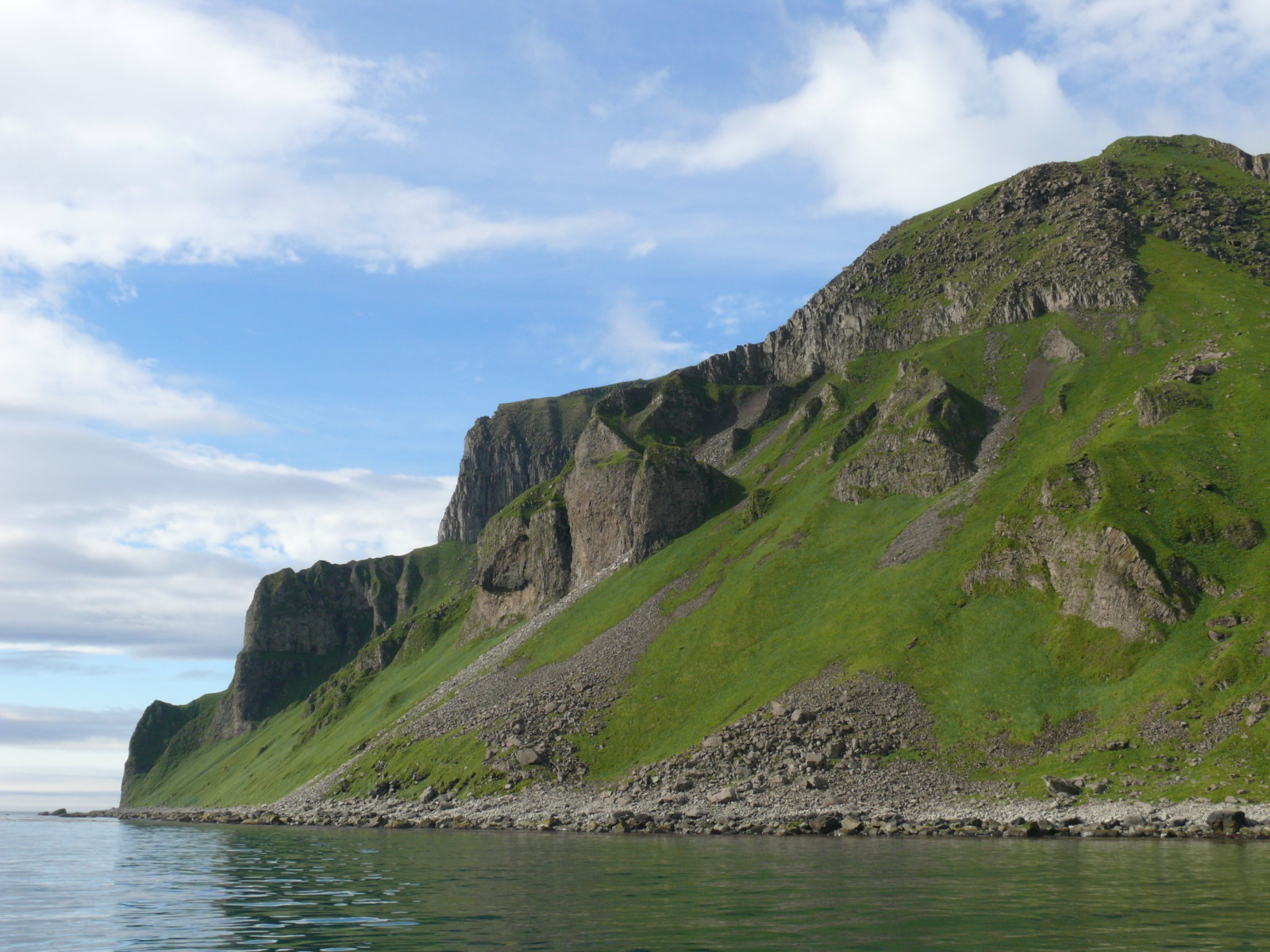
Cape Aiak, on the south coast of Unalaska Island in July

The Aleut (Unangan) people have lived on the island for at least 10,000 years. The island was first seen by westerners in 1741 by Vitus Bering. By 1759, at least 3,000 Aleuts lived on Unalaska island. A Russian settlement was constructed in 1759, but four years later it was destroyed by the Aleuts, together with four merchant ships. The attacks claimed the lives of 162 Russian settlers. The survivors managed to hold their own until 1764, when they were rescued by the Russians. This event triggered bloody reprisals against the natives which took the lives of about 5,000 Aleuts. By 1787, many Aleut seal hunters were enslaved by the Russian American Company and forced to harvest seal fur. By 1840, only 200 to 400 Aleuts still lived on the island.

In October 1778, English explorer James Cook visited the island for three weeks on his third voyage, and spelled it Oonalashka in his journal.

The 1788 expedition of Esteban José Martínez and Gonzalo López de Haro explored the coast of Alaska as far as Unalaska Island, marking the farthest west the Spanish ever explored in the region.

The Russian ship Rurik led by Otto von Kotzebue visited Unalaska twice, in 1815 and 1816. During the second visit, the French-German naturalist Adelbert von Chamisso collaborated with natives to create three-dimensional models of different whale species, in order to transfer and conserve indigenous knowledge about whales. He published drawings along with Aleut species names of the painted driftwood models, which are preserved in Berlin.

In Moscow on May 31, 1988, President Ronald Reagan mentioned the meeting of Americans and Russians on this island in the 19th century as an example of early US-Russian friendship.

On December 8, 2004, the Malaysian cargo ship MV Selendang Ayu ran aground off Unalaska Island, causing a large oil spill.

On October 25, 1977, an extremely intense extratropical system struck the area. A pressure of 926 millibars (27.3 inHg) was recorded at Dutch Harbor, which is the lowest non-tropical pressure ever recorded in the United States until December 31, 2020, when another system struck the islands with a pressure of 924.8 millibars (27.31 inHg).

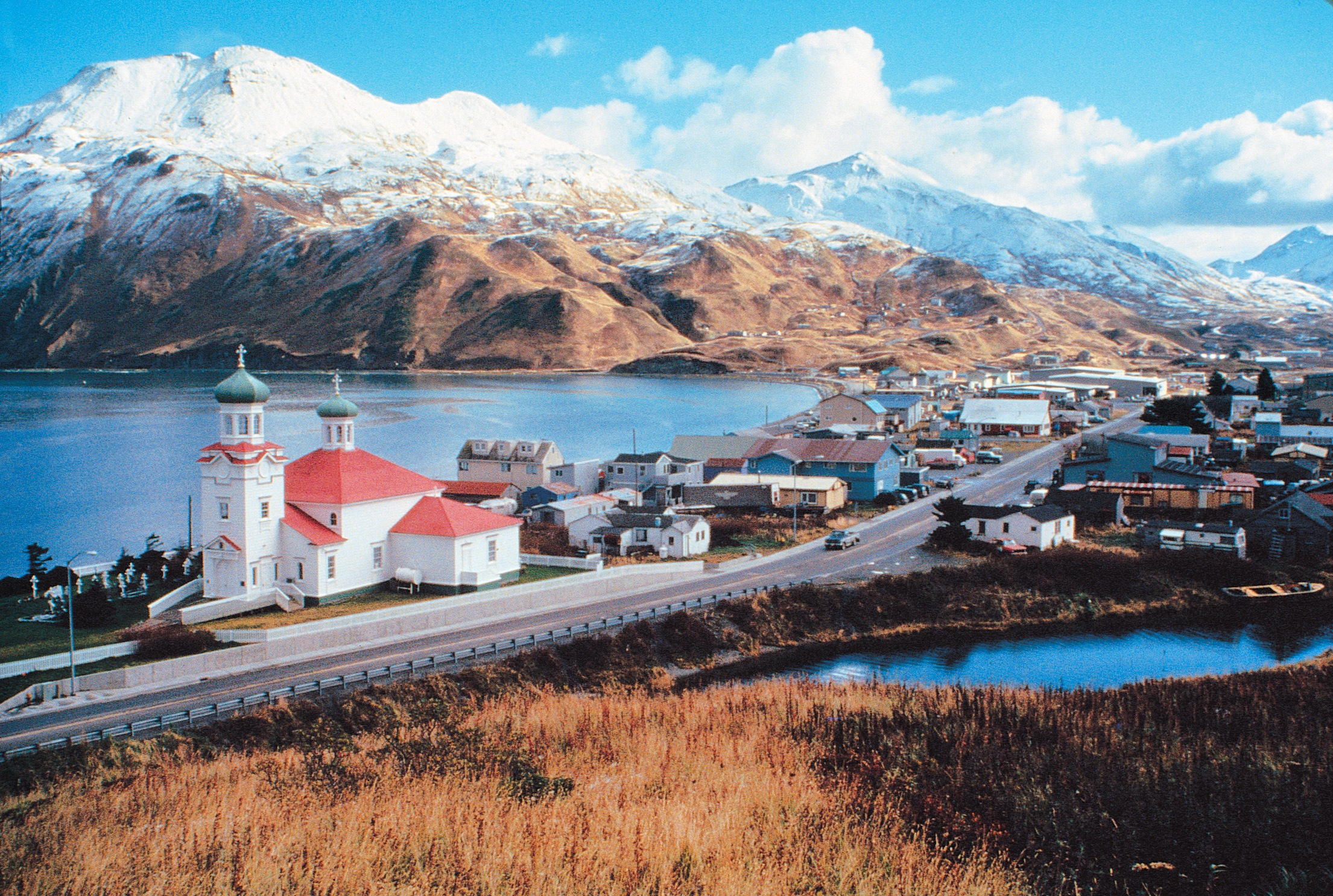
The City of Unalaska, Alaska

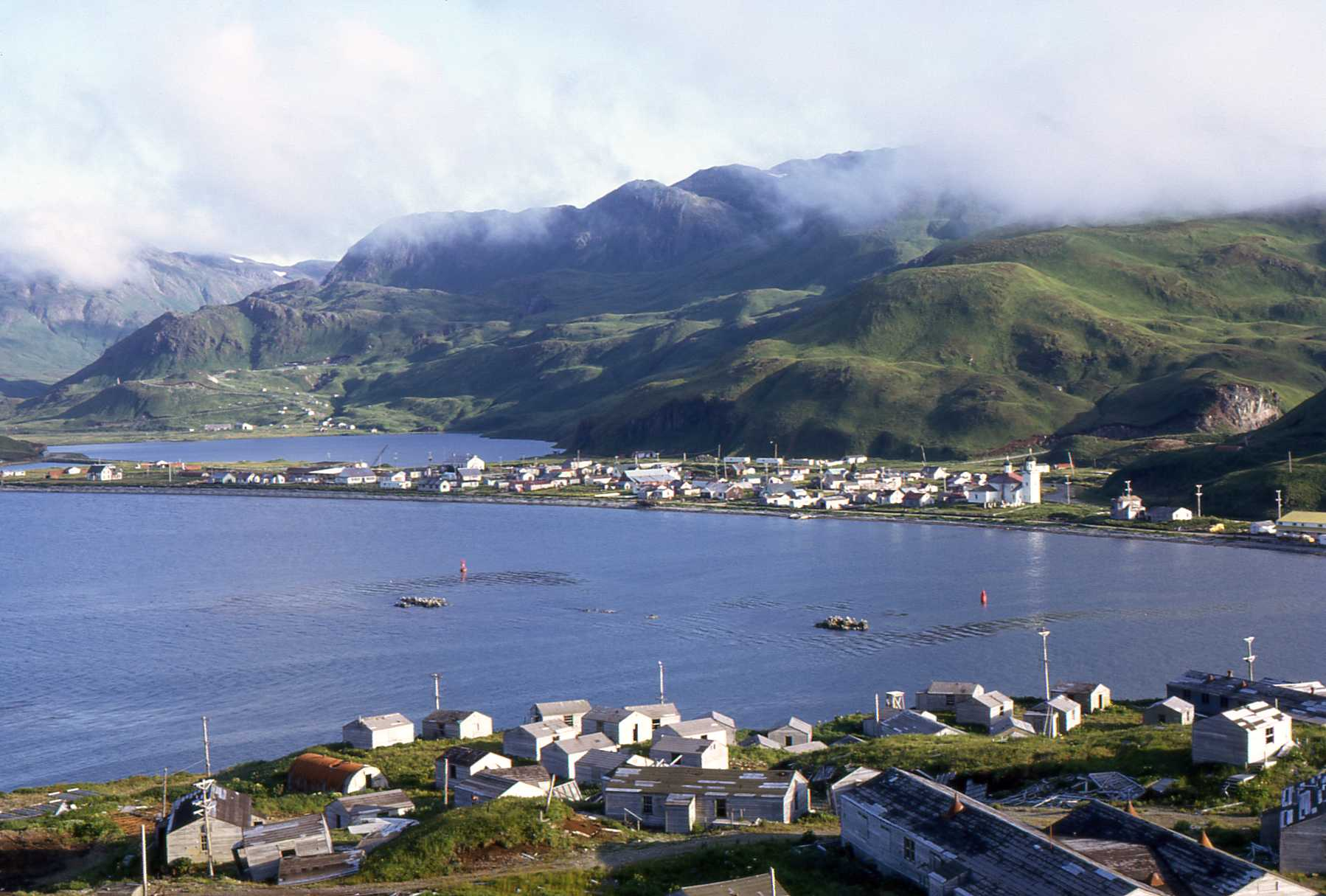
Unalaska Island in 1972

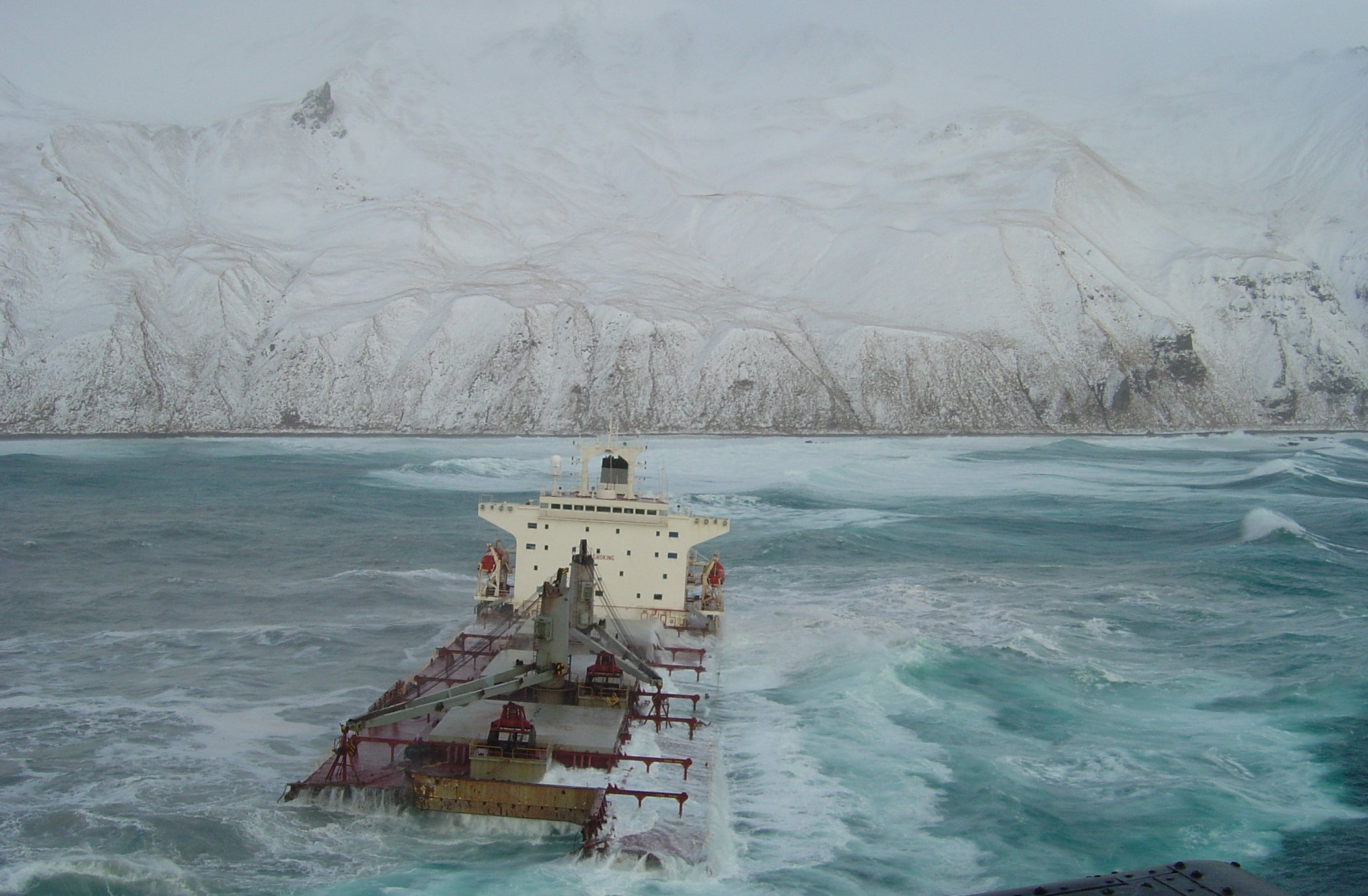
Selendang Ayu ran aground off Unalaska in 2004, spilling approximately 350,000 gallons of oil.
