= Tham Pha Ka =

Cave in Nam Fuang Valley, Laos

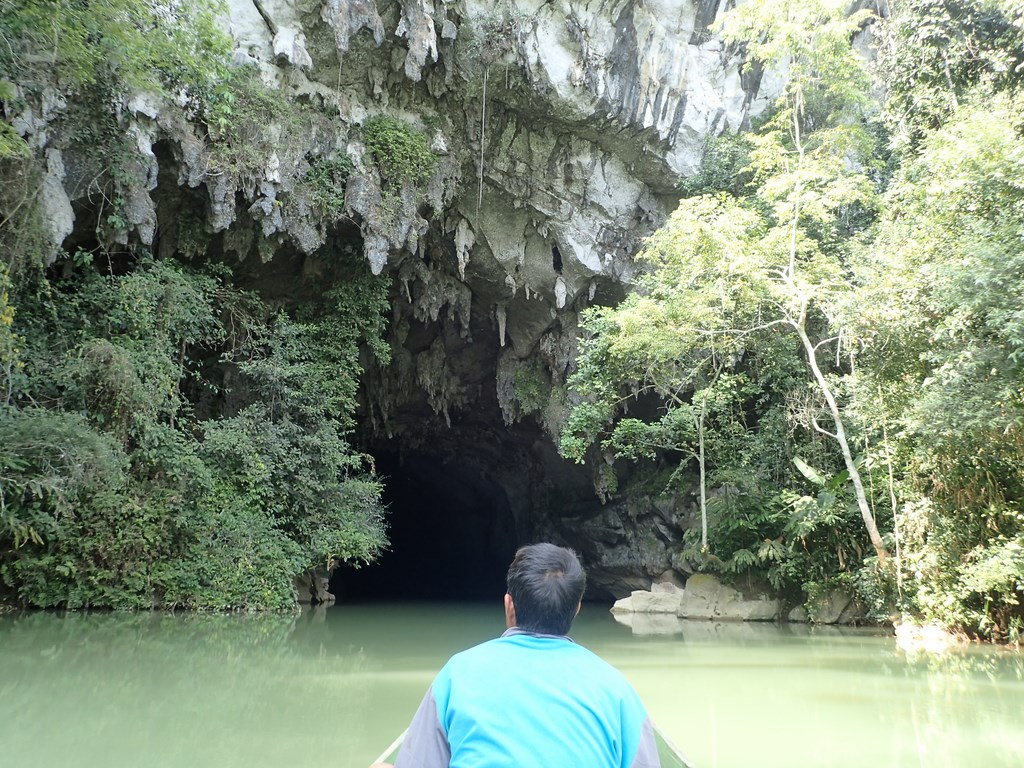
- Tham Pha Ka entrance

- Location within Laos
- Location: Nam Fuang Valley, Laos
- Coordinates: 19°01′51″N 101°54′08″E
- Length: >8952 m
- Elevation: 315m
- Geology: Karst cavern, Limestone
- Cave survey: EEGC (2014, 2016, 2019, 2020), J.E.T. (2018)

Tham Pha Ka, or Tham Phaka, (Lao ຖ້ຳຜາກ້າ) is a karst limestone river cave in Vientiane Province, Laos, located roughly 22 kilometres (14 mi) north of Muang Met. The Nam Fuang River, a tributary of the Mekong River, flows through the cave.

It is potentially the largest cave in Laos, with nearly 9 km of the cave system surveyed and published, and a height of 120 m and width of 400 m recorded so far. The four main natural underground networks of Laos are the Nam Dôn system (45 km), Tham Nam Non (28 km), Pha Soung (21 km) and Chom Ong (18 km).

The cave has been used by the local population for guano extraction as well as for religious retreats. The government of the Lao People's Democratic Republic has been presenting the cave as "ideal for the development of a people-centered ecotourism site". Recent speleological explorations have highlighted the exceptional nature of this cave and aroused interest in it. The Muang Met tourist office is currently looking for a tourism operator to develop activities there

Tham Pha Ka faces a planned hydroelectric project further downstream—the Nam Fuang Hydropower Project—that threatens to flood most of the lower part of the cave system.

== History of exploration ==
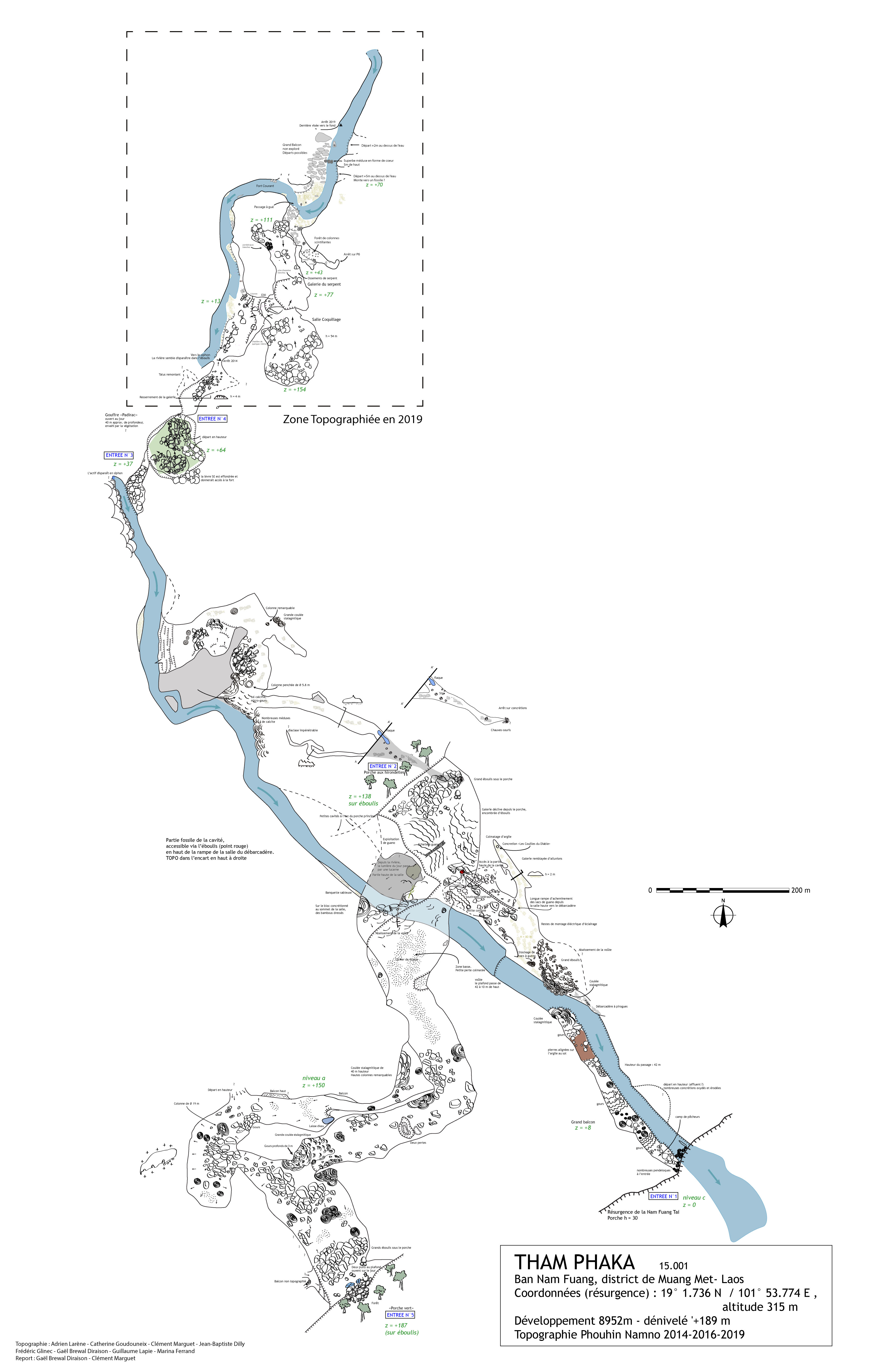
Tham Pha Kha Survey

A French speleological club affiliated to the French Federation of Speleology, the EEGC (Etude et Exploration des Gouffres et Carrières), has been exploring and surveying Tham Pha Ka since March 2014 over three expeditions. 11498 metres of the cave system were surveyed in 2014, 2016, 2019, 2020 and 2025. In 2018, the J.E.T. (Japanese Exploration Team) explored the Tham Pha Ka cave system accompanied by an NHK television crew, pushing the exploration upstream and reached the Nam Fuang inflow entrance

== Biospeleology ==
A new species of Coleoptera (Beetles) has been discovered in Tham Pha Ka: Ptomaphaminus ferrandae (Perreau & Lemaire, 2018).

Two samples collected from the cave are paratypes used to describe a second species of Coleoptera in the family Aderidae, Zarcosia lemairei (Gompel, 2020).
