= Croatian Mountain Rescue Service =

Public interest volunteer organization

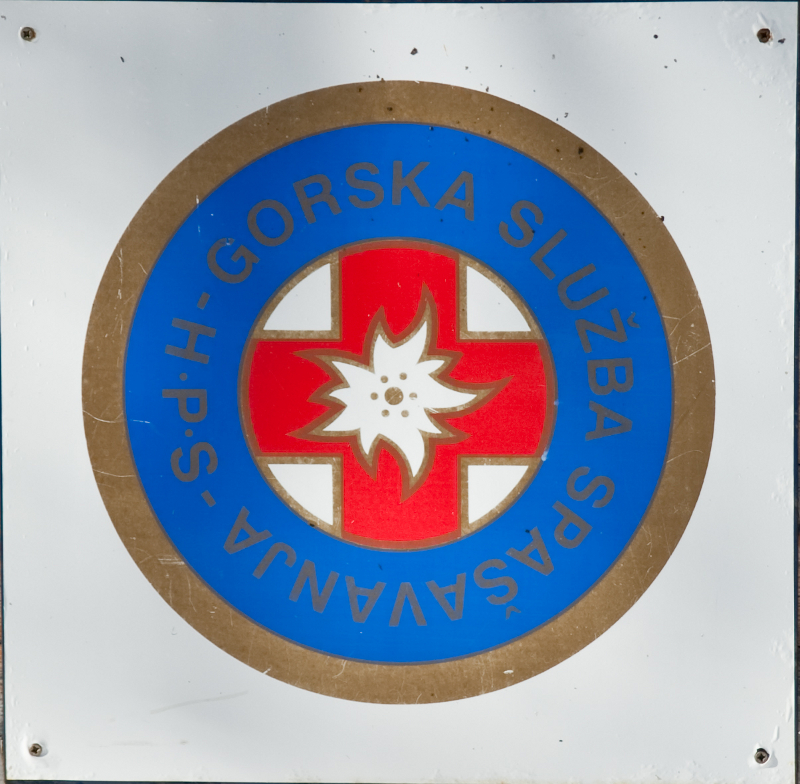
- Abbreviation: GSS, HGSS
- Formation: 1950; 76 years ago
- Legal status: Active
- Headquarters: Zagreb, Croatia
- Region served: Croatia
- Head: Josip Granić
- Secretary: Darko Berljak
- Website: hgss.hr

Croatian Mountain Rescue Service (Croatian: Hrvatska gorska služba spašavanja, HGSS or GSS) is a national, voluntary, professional, humanitarian and non-partisan association working in the public interest. It is dedicated to preventing accidents, and providing rescue and first aid services in mountains and other hardly accessible or inaccessible areas as well as in extraordinary circumstances which require special know-how and equipment for preserving human, material and environmental resources.

The CMRS is a non-profit association that performs services of national interest. There are 25 mountain rescue teams across the entire territory of the Republic of Croatia.

The CMRS works in close cooperation with state authorities and local and regional self-government units, institutions, the Croatian Armed Forces, health care and social welfare institutions, the Croatian Mountaineering Association and other legal and natural persons from the field of culture, physical education and sports, tourism, protection of nature and environment as well as transport. It also cooperates closely with public institutions and nature protection bodies responsible for the protection and preservation of nature and environment of mountains. Moreover, the CMRS operates very often in urban and other non-mountainous areas as well, performing jobs that include height, tunnels or pipes, providing assistance in cases of road or sea accidents, and in a number of extreme sports (paragliding, mountain biking, rafting, etc.). In addition to rescue and first aid services to injured casualties in hardly accessible or inaccessible areas, the CMRS pays great attention to education and prevention, i.e. prevention and avoidance of accidents in inaccessible terrains, particularly mountains. Namely, mountain rescue teams are present at all major Croatian ski resorts (Sljeme, Platak, Bjelolasica), rock climbing area in the Paklenica National Park, as well as at various extreme sport events, such as mountain bike races, sport climbing competitions and more.

In 2014, members of the Croatian Mountain Rescue service took part in the Riesending Cave rescue in Bavaria, Germany, one of the largest and most difficult cave rescues in history.

HGSS is a member of ICAR (International commission for alpine rescue), is also a member and one of the founders of ECRA (European Cave Rescue Association). HGSS is also a member of the IRO - International Search and Rescue Dog Organization.

Since 2018, they have been participating in NATO activities for major accidents and disasters, while since 2015 they have been developing a Croatian rescue module using vessels, designated HR FRB 01. This module has passed international exercises in Poland, Romania, and Hungary, and its final testing is expected in June of 2026 in Moldova. CMRS also trains Chinese rescuers for water and flood rescues under the Rescue3 license.

== Sources ==
- Croatian Parliament (2006-07-17). "Zakon o Hrvatskoj gorskoj službi spašavanja" [Law on the Croatian Mountain Rescue Service]. Narodne novine (in Croatian) (79/2006).
