= Grotte Casteret =

Limestone ice cave in Aragon, Spain

- Gruta Helada de Casteret
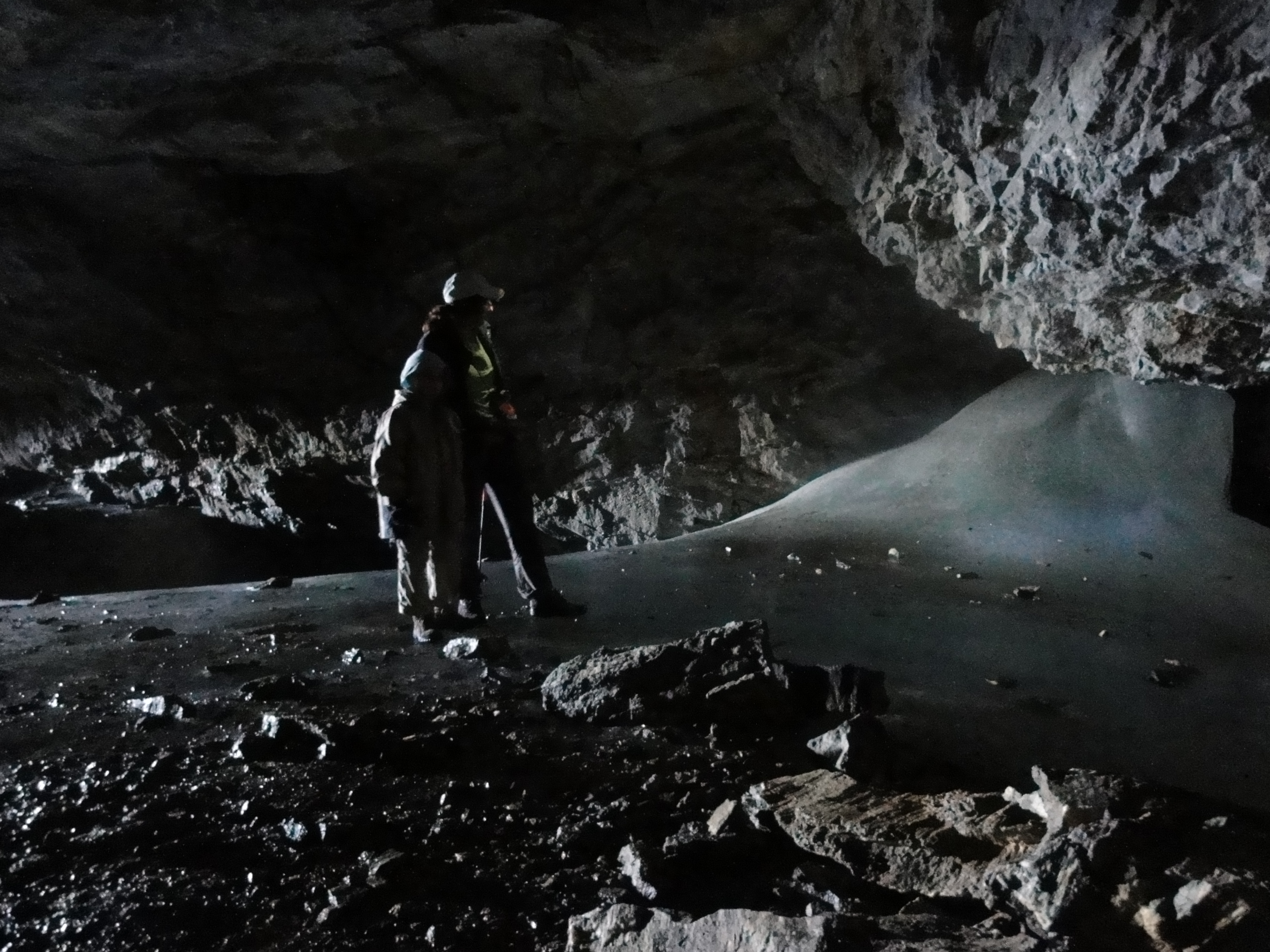
- The Grande Salle in the Grotte Casteret

- Location within Spain
- Location: Aragon, Spain
- Coordinates: 42°41′07″N 0°01′57″W
- Length: 500 metres (1,600 ft).
- Height variation: 80 metres (260 ft)
- Elevation: 2,640 metres (8,660 ft)
- Discovery: 1926
- Geology: Cretaceous limestone
- Entrances: 3.
- Hazards: Ice
- Access: Controlled
- Cave survey: SWETCC, 1961

The Grotte Casteret, also known by its Spanish names Gruta de Casteret or Gruta Helada de Casteret, is a limestone ice cave, located high in the Spanish Pyrenees, within the Ordesa y Monte Perdido National Park. Discovered in 1926 by Norbert Casteret, it is known for its Grande Salle (Great Hall) which has a frozen lake some 2,000 square metres (22,000 sq ft) in area, its ice formations, and a 20 metres (66 ft) ice wall into a second chamber.

== Description ==
The Grotte Casteret is situated at the top of a scree / snow couloir 670 metres (730 yd) ESE of the Brèche de Roland, and has an impressive entrance porch some 50 metres (160 ft) wide, and 15 metres (49 ft) high. After 60 metres (200 ft) the passage opens out into the vast ice-floored Grande Salle, about 70 metres (230 ft) long, 60 metres (200 ft) wide, and 4 metres (13 ft) high. Its floor is a frozen lake of clear ice with a surface area of about 2,000 square metres (22,000 sq ft). Large ice columns dominate the end of the chamber. To the left of the chamber an opening leads into the Salle Maude at the base of a 20 metres (66 ft) ice-wall called Niagara.

Beyond the Grande Salle, the ice floor gives way to a mainly boulder-floored passage which leads after 120 metres (390 ft) leads to a 3 metres (9.8 ft) climb which emerges in a lapiaz field on the surface. Casteret's original survey shows the passage extending for a further 100 metres (330 ft), but this is no longer accessible.

A third entrance, the Puits Florence, lies on the plateau above the cave. It is 60 metres (200 ft) deep, with the final 50 metres (160 ft) being a vertical shaft entering the Grande Salle.

== History ==
The cave was first entered by the family Casteret (Norbert Casteret, his mother, his wife, and his brother) in July 1926 when they explored most of the main passage. He and his wife returned in September 1926 when they achieved the through trip. The Salle Maude was discovered and explored in August 1950 by Casteret and his daughters Maude and Gilberte. The third entrance, the Puits Florence, was first descended in August 1975 by the Club Martel.

== Geology and formation ==
The Grotte Casteret is formed in Cretaceous limestone. The ice in the Grande Salle is ponded and has formed as the result of cold air flowing through the system, with areas out of the draught being water. The deeper ice is considered to be very old, and possibly relict of a cold period of the Quaternary. The volume of ice in the Grande Salle has decreased since its discovery. In 1950 the entry into Salle Maude was a low crawl across the ice floor about 30 centimetres (12 in) high. In 1988 it was reported that the gap was 150 centimetres (4.9 ft) high as a result of the ice floor lowering.

== Access ==
Access is controlled by the Ordesa y Monte Perdido National Park authorities. A barrier has been erected within the entrance, and a sign prohibits access to the casual visitor. Two groups of up to 6 cavers, are allowed access for a maximum of four days per month.
