= Robert de Joly =

Robert-Jacques de Joly (July 5, 1887, Paris – November 13, 1968 (aged 81), Montpellier) was a famous French caver and speleologist. Considered by some as the successor to Édouard-Alfred Martel (the "father of modern speleology"), de Joly was a leading figure of French speleology between the world wars (along with Norbert Casteret) and into the 1960s.

De Joly was an active cave explorer throughout his entire life, from age fourteen until shortly before his death at the age of eighty. He was known for his physical strength and strong personality, and was responsible for inspiring and training many successful and influential cavers. De Joly is credited with the invention of the lightweight, portable steel-cable ('electron') ladder, a tool that expanded the possibilities of cave explorations and became standard caving equipment for the next fifty years. Amongst his numerous explorations was the Aven d'Orgnac, one of the most beautiful caves in France, later developed into a show cave.

In 1930 de Joly founded the Spéléo-club de France and revived the publication Spelunca, and in 1936 he helped found the Société spéléologique de France (SSF), of which he became president. De Joly traveled throughout Europe and North America representing France at speleological conferences. His reputation was such that he was tasked with many commissions from various government departments.

De Joly authored numerous articles and three books, including Ma vie adventureuse d'explorateur d'abîmes which was later translated into English as Memoirs of a Speleologist and continues to inspire generations of cavers today.

== Honours ==
- Grand Bronze Medal of the Touring Club de France (1928)
- Red Medal of the Société de statistique de Marseille (1929)
- Grand Silver Medal of the Club Cévenol (1931)
- Hydrogeology Prize of the Société de Géographie de Paris (1931)
- Ministry of Education award (1936)
- Member of the Académie des Sciences de Montpelier (1939)
- Member of the Académie des Sciences de Nîmes (1940)
- Vice-president of the Société de Sciences Naturelles du Gard (1950)
- Knight of the Légion d'honneur, for military service (1950)
- Medal for Research and Invention (1958)
- Gold Medal from the Commissariat aux Sports (1953)
- Gold Medal for Tourism (1960)
- Officer of the Légion d'honneur, for service to speleology (1967)

== Sources ==
- De Joly, Robert (1975). Memoirs of a Speleologist. Zephyrus Press.
