= Schellenberg Ice Cave =

Cave in Germany

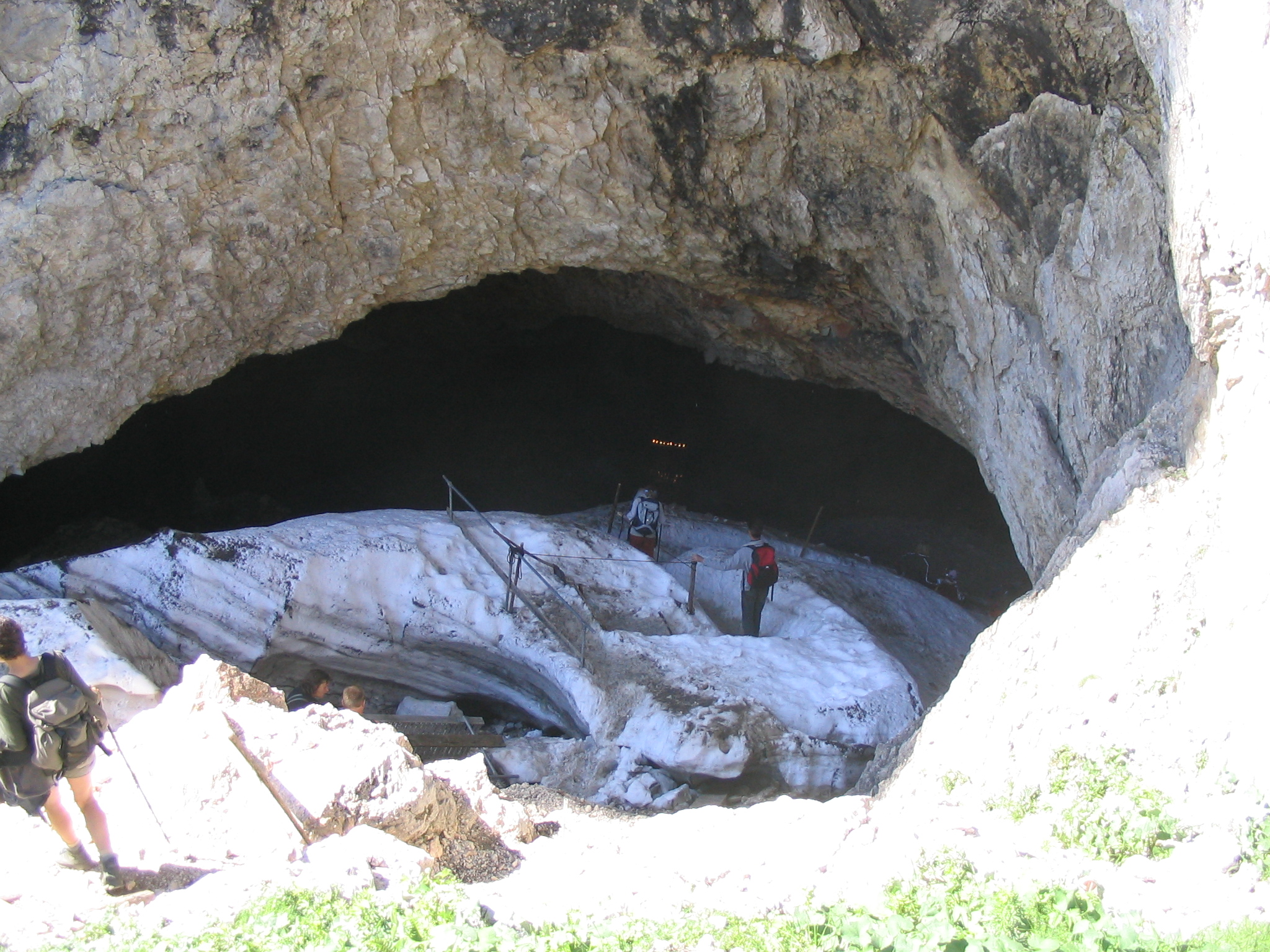
- Entrance area of the Schellenberg Ice Cave

- Location within Bavaria
- Coordinates: 47°42′48″N 13°0′16″E
- Elevation: 1,570 m
- Website: http://eishoehle.net/

The Schellenberg Ice Cave is a cave located in the Berchtesgaden Alps in Upper Bavaria, Germany, near the Austrian border. The cave belongs to the Untersberg massif, at 1570 metres above sea level, and is the only ice cave open in Germany. It has an estimated ice volume of about 60,000 cubic meters and has been run as a show cave since 1925. The explored length of the ice cave is 3,621 meters, of which, 500 meters is a guided tour at temperatures near zero degrees Celsius. Closed between October and May, the ice cave can only be reached after a several-hour walk from the valley below, or a slightly shorter walk from the mountain station of the Untersbergbahn. It is one of two show caves in Germany without electric light, illuminated only by carbide lamps carried by the visitors. It is named after Marktschellenberg, a nearby town in Berchtesgadener Land district. In 1826, it was first mentioned in writing, and fully explored by 1874.

== See also ==
- Riesending Cave
