= Untersberg =

Massif of the Berchtesgaden Alps near Salzburg

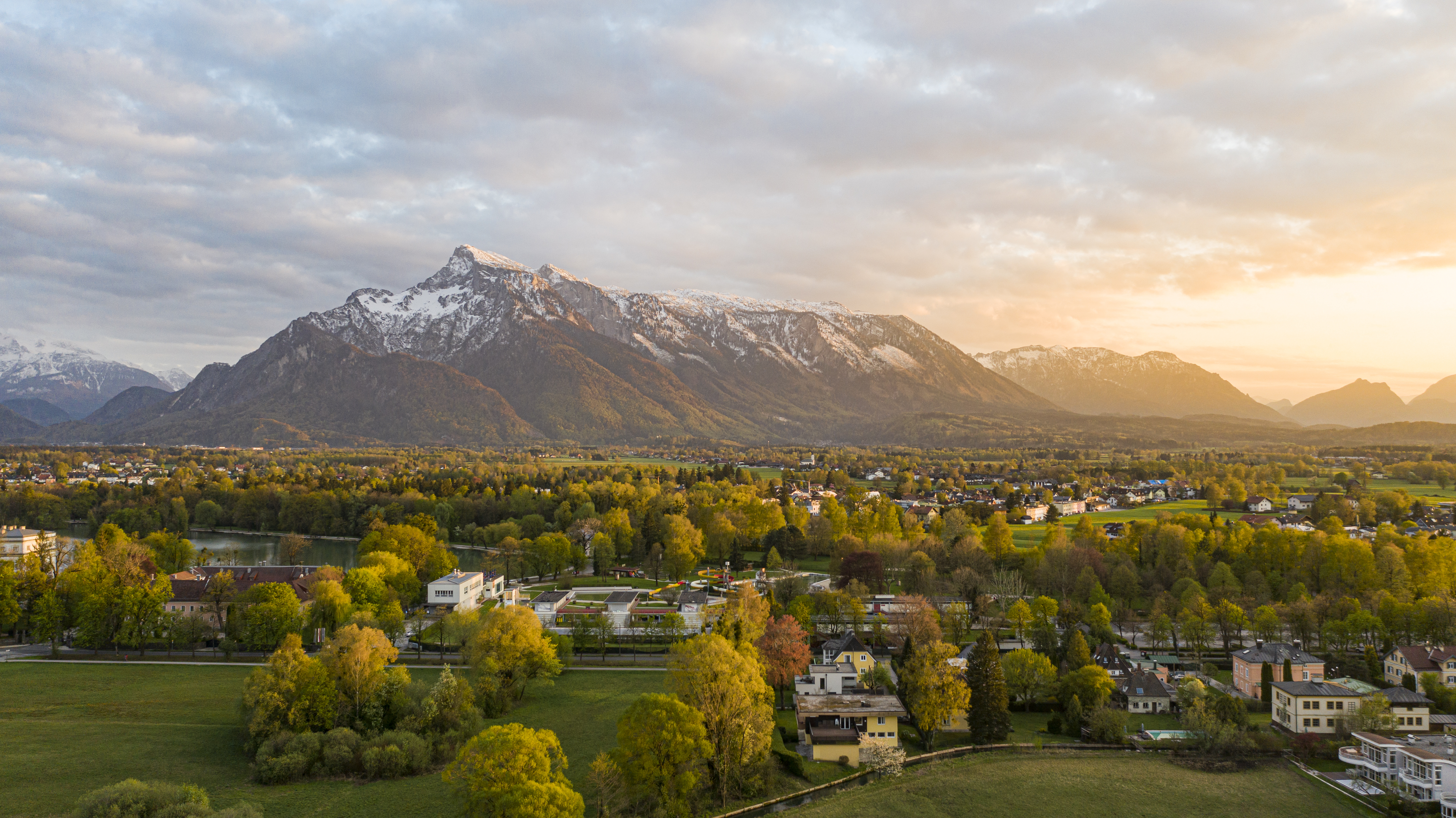
- Untersberg seen from Salzburg

Highest point
- Elevation: 1,973 m (6,473 ft) (Berchtesgaden Hochthron)
- Prominence: 1,084 m (3,556 ft)
- Isolation: 11.5 km (7.1 mi) → Hoher Göll-Mannlgrat
- Coordinates: 47°42′19″N 12°58′45″E

Geography
- Location within Alps
- Location: Bavaria, Germany; Salzburg, Austria
- Parent range: Berchtesgaden Alps

Climbing
- First ascent: 12th century

The Untersberg is the northernmost massif of the Berchtesgaden Alps, a prominent spur straddling the border between Berchtesgaden, Germany and Salzburg, Austria. The highest peak of the table-top mountain is the Berchtesgaden Hochthron at 1,973 metres (6,473 ft).

The landmark gained international fame as the "distinctive, lopsided peak" featured at the beginning and end of the 1965 movie The Sound of Music, although the filming was done on the German side, not the Austrian side. It was where Julie Andrews sang The Hills Are Alive at the opening scene and where the family climbed the mountain on their escape to Switzerland at the end of the film.

The mountain also lends its name to an 1829 opera, Der Untersberg, by Johann Nepomuk von Poißl (1783–1865).

== Geography ==
The Untersberg rises at the rim of the Northern Limestone Alps, immediately at the Salzburg Basin and the broad Salzach Valley. Neighbouring peaks are the Hoher Göll in the southeast and Mt. Watzmann in the south, beyond the Berchtesgaden Basin. In the northwest, the Saalach Valley with Bad Reichenhall separates it from the Hochstaufen massif of the Chiemgau Alps. About two-thirds of the area, including the Berchtesgaden Hochthron peak, is located in Germany, while the northernmost steep edge above Salzburg belongs to Austria.

The mountain is a landmark popular with tourists, due to its proximity to the City of Salzburg: less than 16 kilometres (9.9 mi) south of the city centre and within easy reach, e.g. by bus lines running to the southern suburbs of Grödig and Großgmain.

Several trails lead to the top, though most people prefer the Untersbergbahn cable car. Constructed over a period of over two years, and opening in April 1961, the eight and a half minute journey lifts passengers from the lower terminus at the village of Sankt Leonhard at 456 m (1,496 ft) over 1,320 m (4,330 ft) to the top station on the Geiereck spur at an altitude of 1,776 m (5,827 ft), transporting them a horizontal distance of almost 2.5 km (1.6 mi) with a maximum height above the ground of 286 m (938 ft).

The first recorded ascent was in the first half of the 12th century, by Eberwein, a member of the Augustinian monastery at Berchtesgaden.

=== Peaks ===
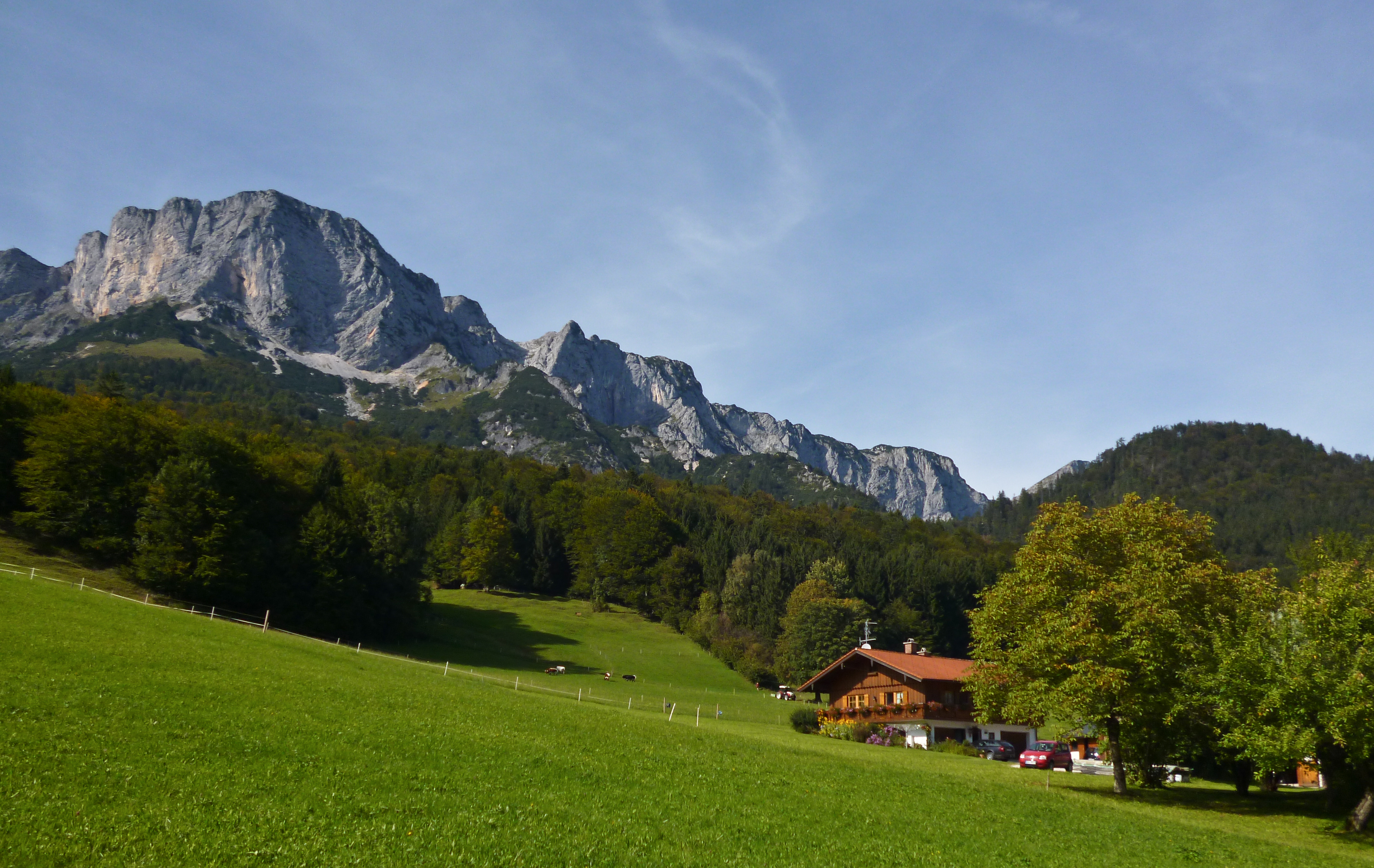
Eastern slope of the Berchtesgaden Hochthron

- Berchtesgaden Hochthron: 1,973 m (6,473 ft)
- Rauheck: 1,892 m (6,207 ft)
- Gamsalpkopf: 1,888 m (6,194 ft)
- Salzburg Hochthron: 1,853 m (6,079 ft)
- Mitterberg: 1,840 m (6,040 ft)
- Geiereck: 1,806 m (5,925 ft)

== Geology ==
The Untersberg massif is mainly made up of limestone. Within it, the Upper Cretaceous Gosau Group is the source of a pale cream, rose to gray yellow, massive and very dense limestone known as the Untersberg Marble. This building stone is a fine to medium grained (partially breccious) arenite that forms the facade of notable buildings such as Salzburg Cathedral.

The Karst topography of the limestone includes numerous caves. So far, more than 400 have been explored—including the Schellenberg Ice Cave at an elevation of 1,570 m (5,150 ft), a show cave since 1925, and the Kolowrat Cave with a 300 m (980 ft) high dome. The Riesending Cave with a depth of 1,148 m (3,766 ft) and a length of 19.5 km (12.1 mi) is the largest known in Germany. There also is a lake at 930 m (3,050 ft) depth. An expedition in August 2008 revealed that its lowest point had not yet been reached.

== Legend ==
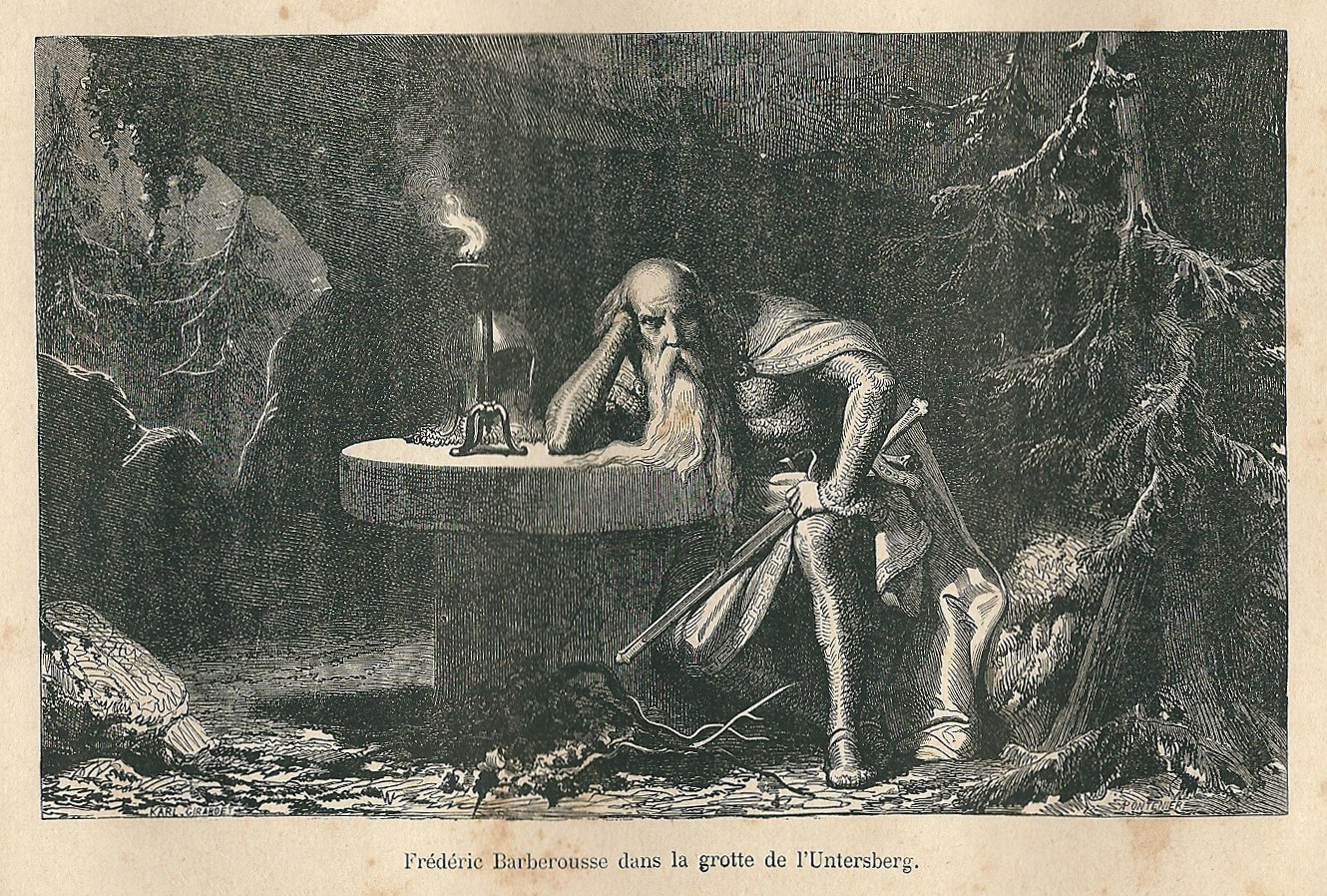
Karl Girardet (1813 – 1871): Frédéric Barberousse dans la grotte de l'Untersberg

First mentioned as Vndarnsperch ("Noon Mountain") in a 1306 deed issued by the Salzburg archbishops, the prominent spur has been the subject of numerous myths and legends. According to a popular king asleep in mountain legend, Emperor Frederick Barbarossa shall remain asleep inside Mt. Untersberg until his resurrection. His beard is said to be growing longer and longer around a round table and to have grown round two times. Myth says that when the beard has grown three times around the table the end of the world has come. When Frederick leaves the mountain, there will be no further Holy Roman Emperor and the last great battle of humankind will be fought at the pear tree on the Walserfeld, a pasture near Wals, west of Salzburg. There is a similar legend for the Kyffhäuser Mountain in Thuringia and Trifels Castle.

Other legends say that it is Charlemagne waiting inside the Untersberg, taken care of by the Untersberger Mandln, small dwarf-like creatures. Every hundred years he awakes and when he sees the ravens (actually choughs) still flying around the Untersberg he sleeps for another century. Indeed, Charlemagne had held a synod in Salzburg in 803 AD, where he met with Bishop Arno. The Alpine tradition of the Untersberg Wild Hunt (Perchten) has recently been revived. There are also several legends about the cave system below the mountain.

== Marble ball mills ==
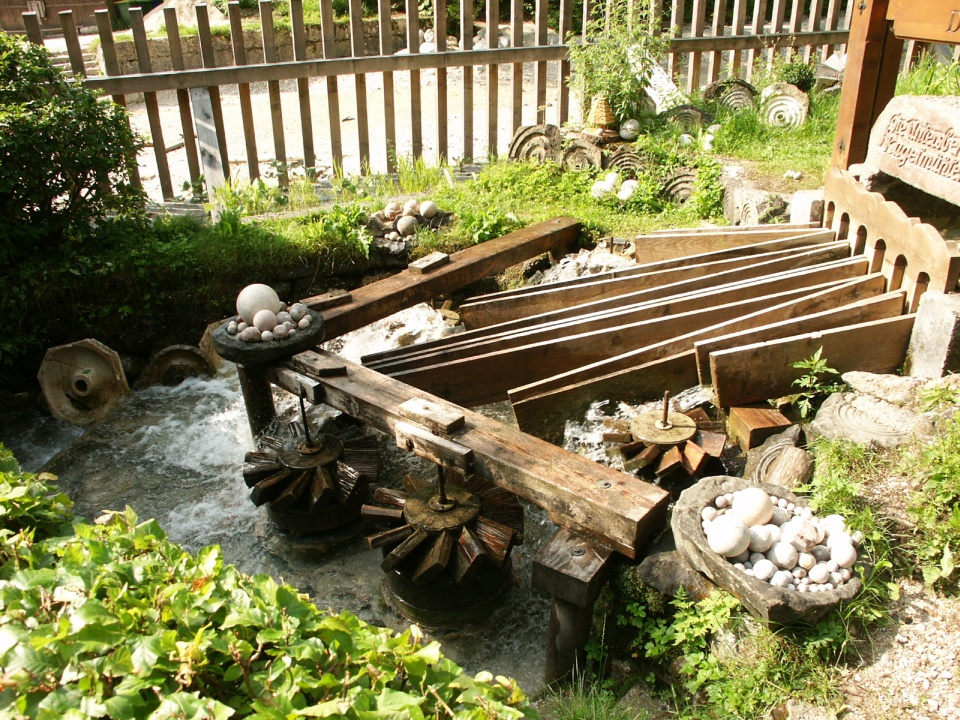
Ball mills by Marktschellenberg

Video

The Untersberger marble ball mills are located in Marktschellenberg in Berchtesgaden, at the opening of the Almbachklamm valley.

The Kugelmühlen (ball mills) were established in 1683. Once popular children's toys, these marbles were shipped all over the world. Through Rotterdam and London, marble shipping was directed toward the East and West Indies and exported at the rate of 60,000 to 80,000 (and sometimes as high as 100,000) pounds per year. Marbles were welcome as cargo in sailing ships, as they were suitable as ballast because of their high density. The last marbles went from Untersberg to London in 1921.

As late as the 1850s, the Almbach valley had 40 ball mills with another 90 in the surrounding region, worked mainly by poor mountain farmers. Today, a single ball mill operates primarily as a tourist attraction.

The ball mills were driven by the waters of the Almbach river. The lower fixed grinding stones are made of hard sandstone and the upper turntables from beech wood. Grinding of the balls varies from two to eight days according to their size. After coarse grinding on the sandstone, the marble balls underwent sanding and a polish.

== Gallery ==
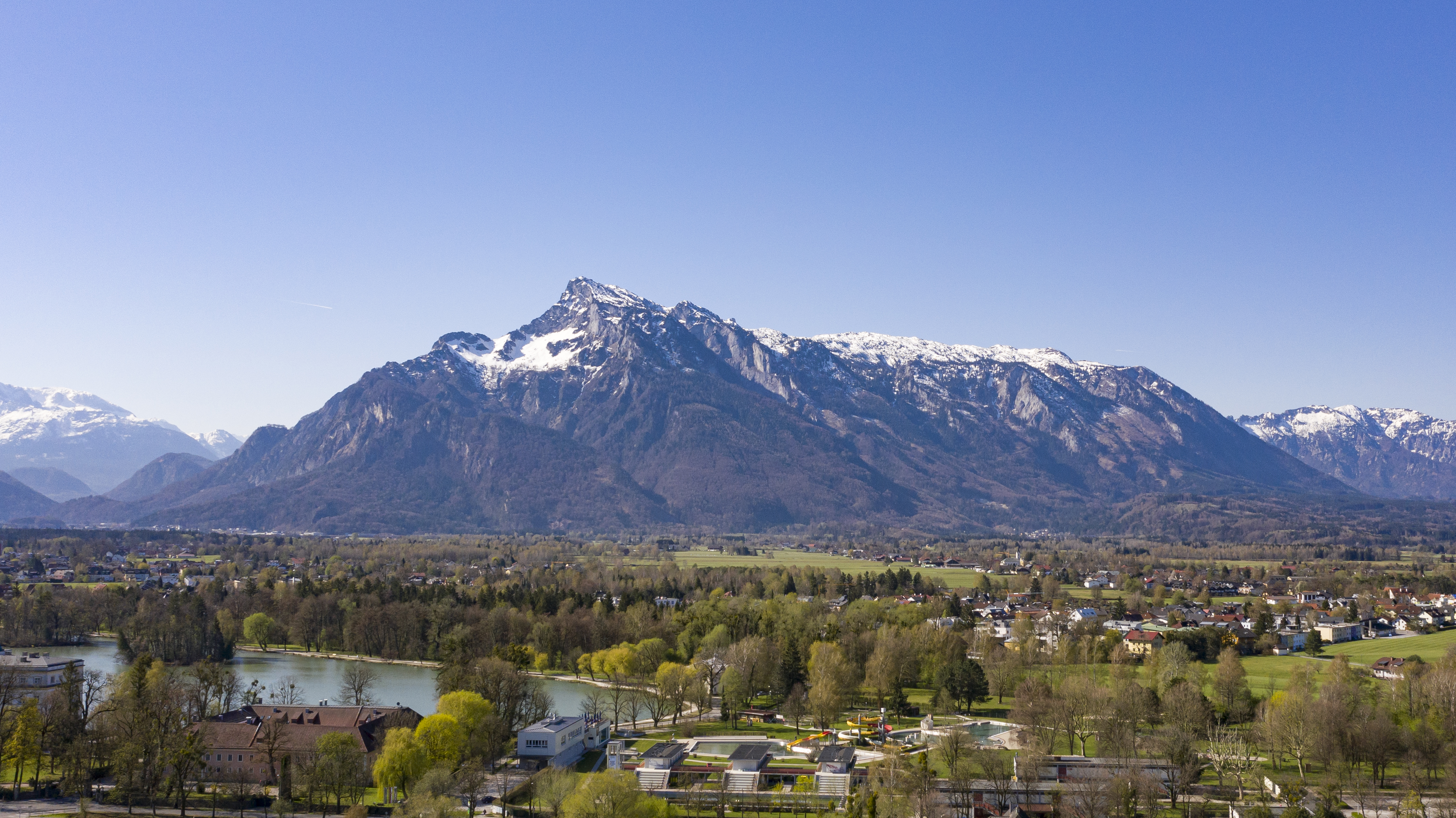
Untersberg in April 2020

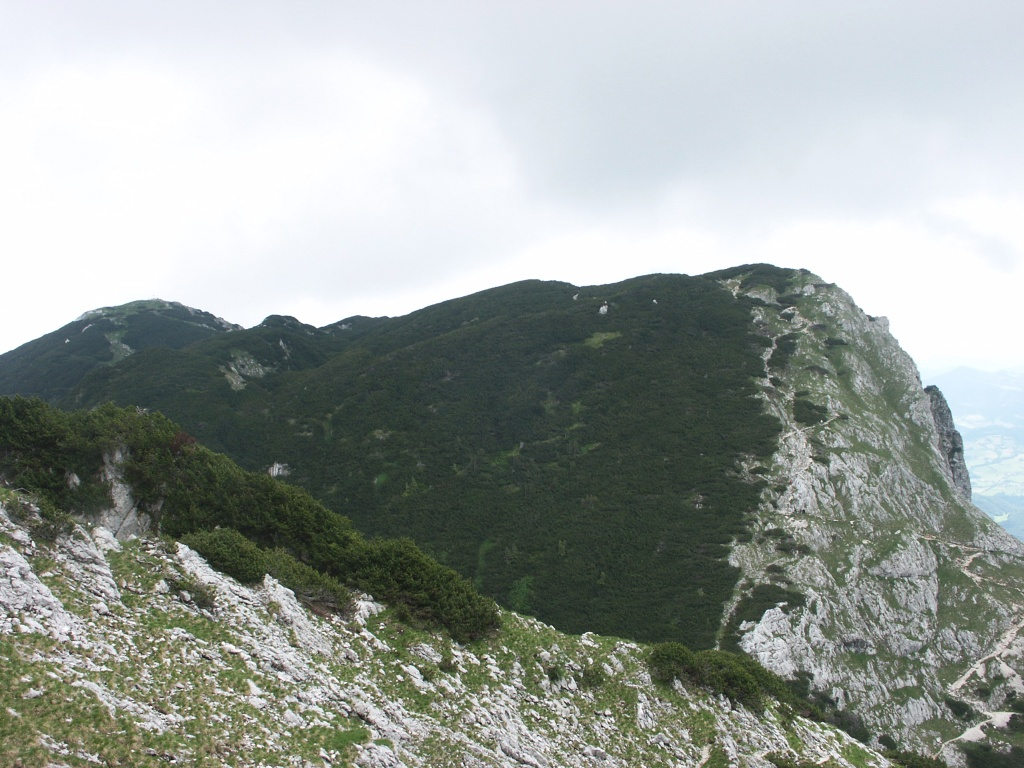
View across the "Mittagsscharte", in the background on the left the "Salzburger Hochthron"

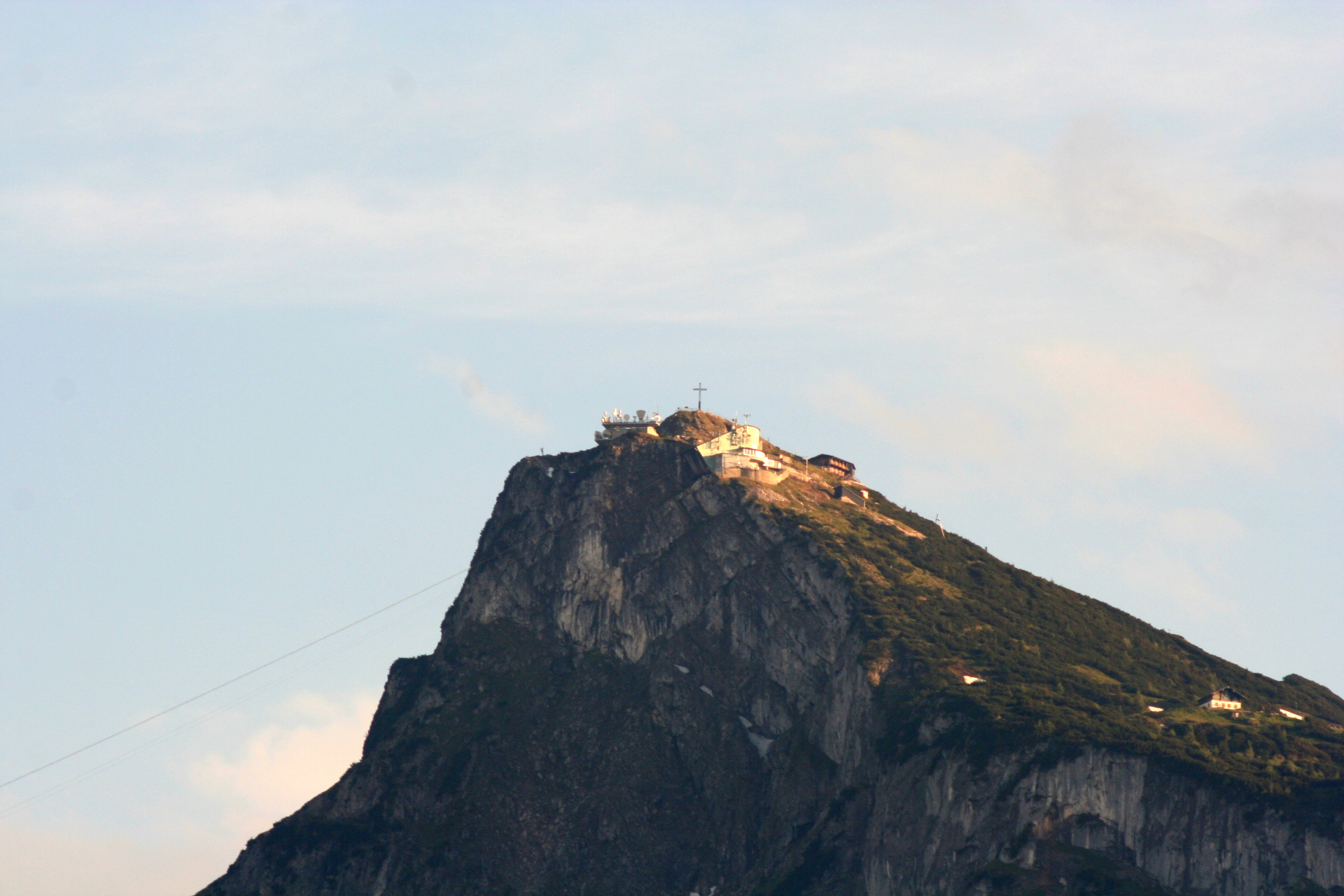
Geiereck, a peak of the Untersberg

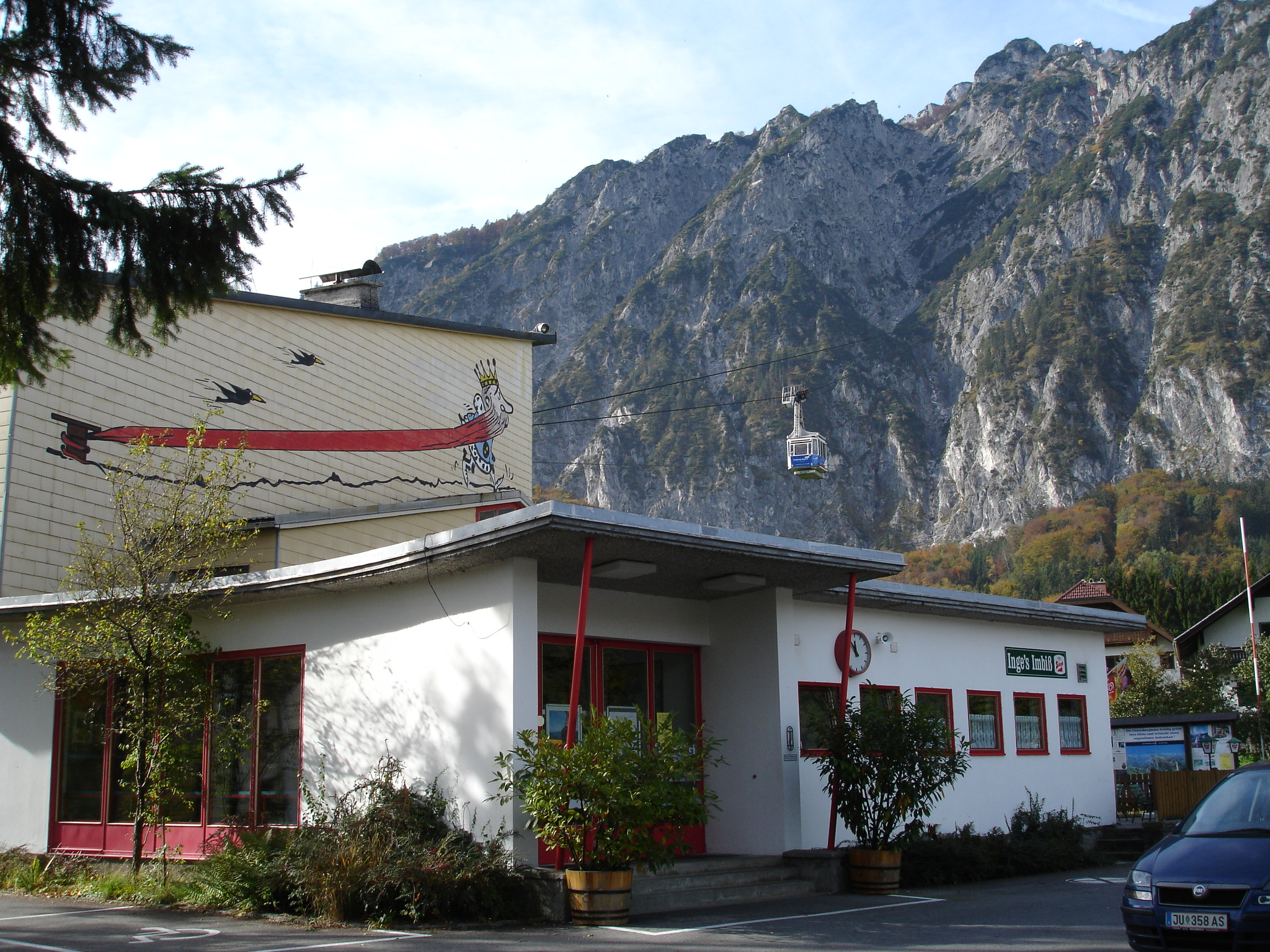
Untersberg cable car station

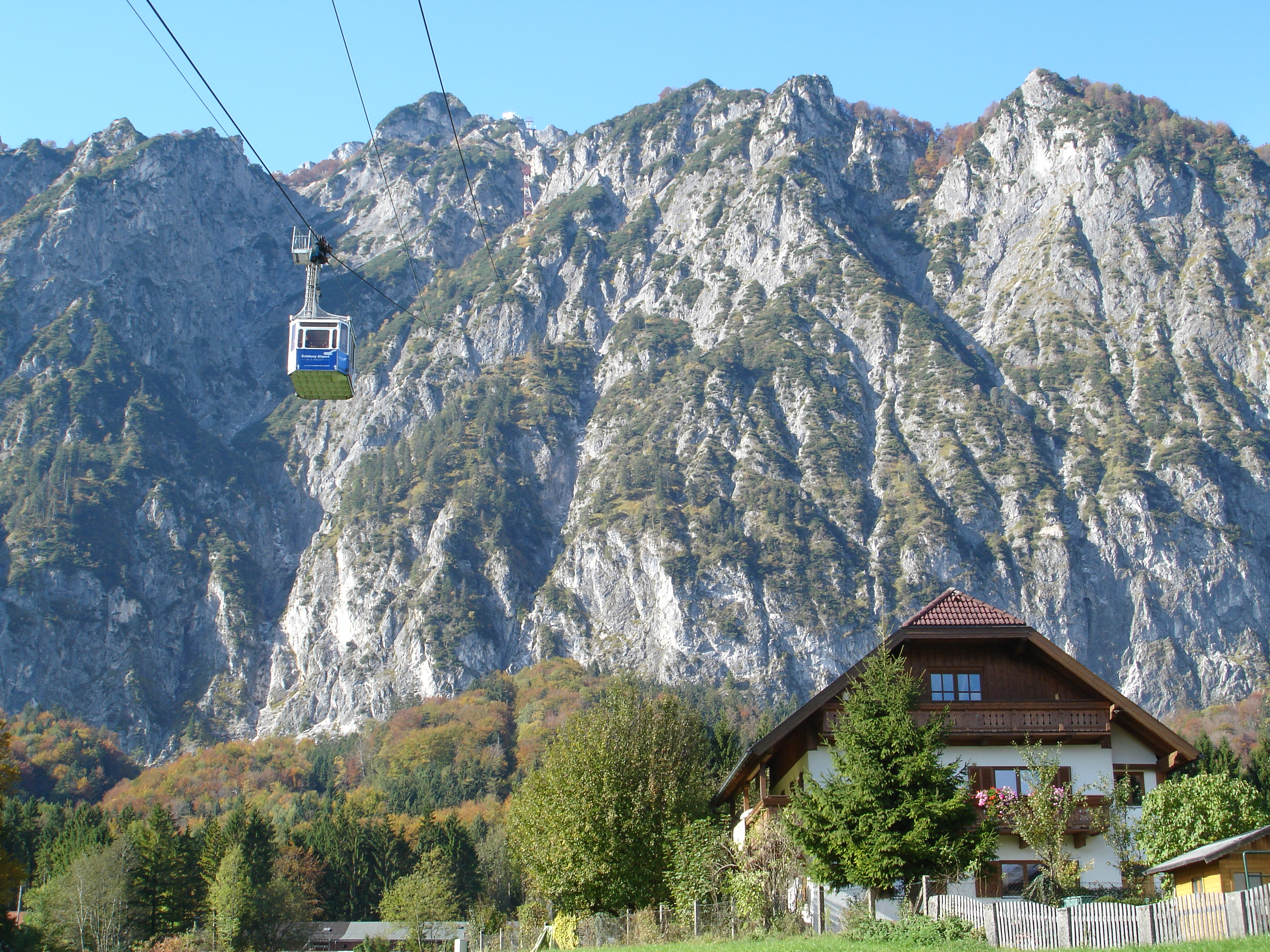
Cable car to Untersberg mountain.

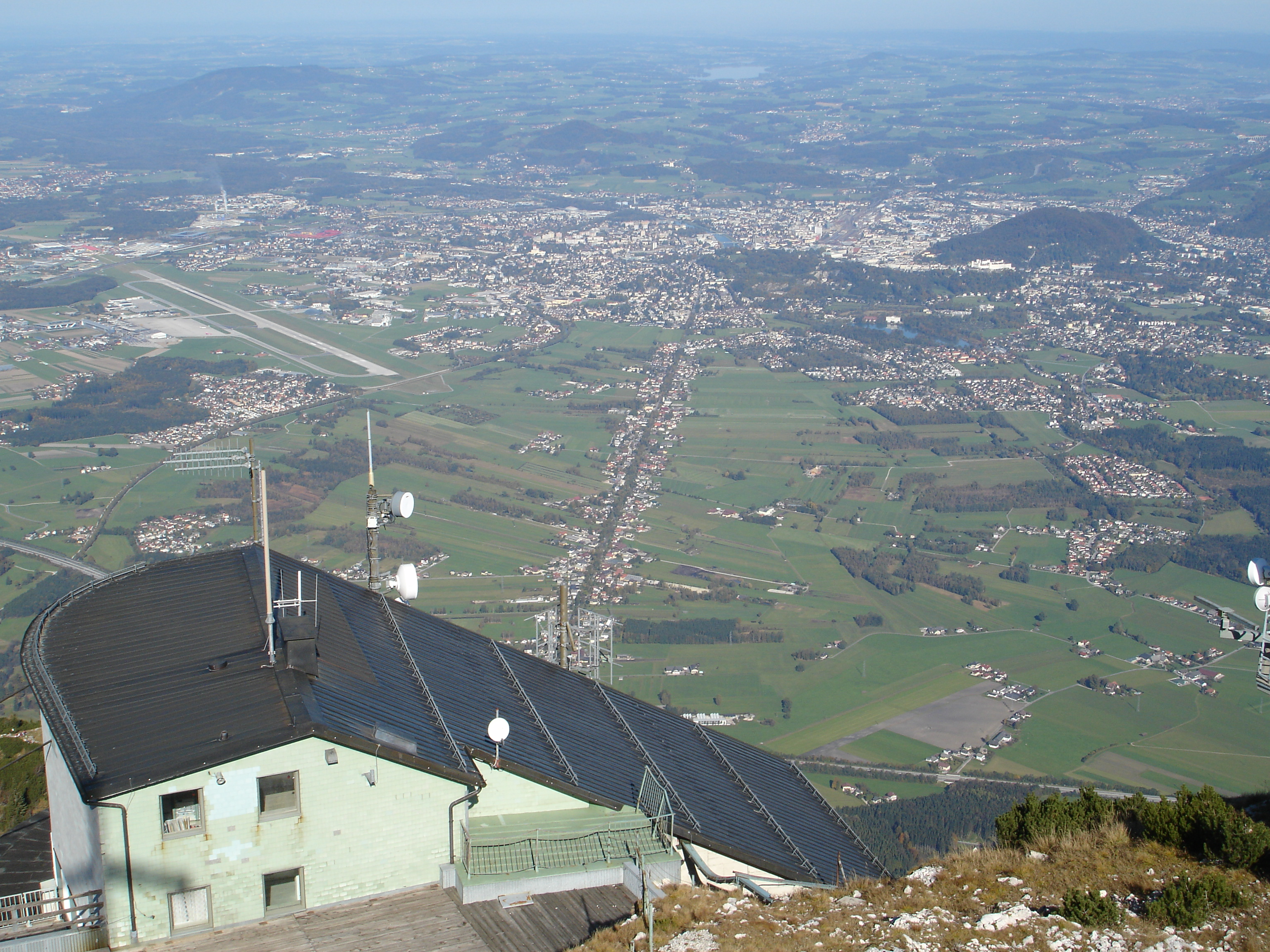
View of the Salzburg basin from the Untersberg mountain top. Note Salzburg Airport on the left and Salzburg old and new towns to the right

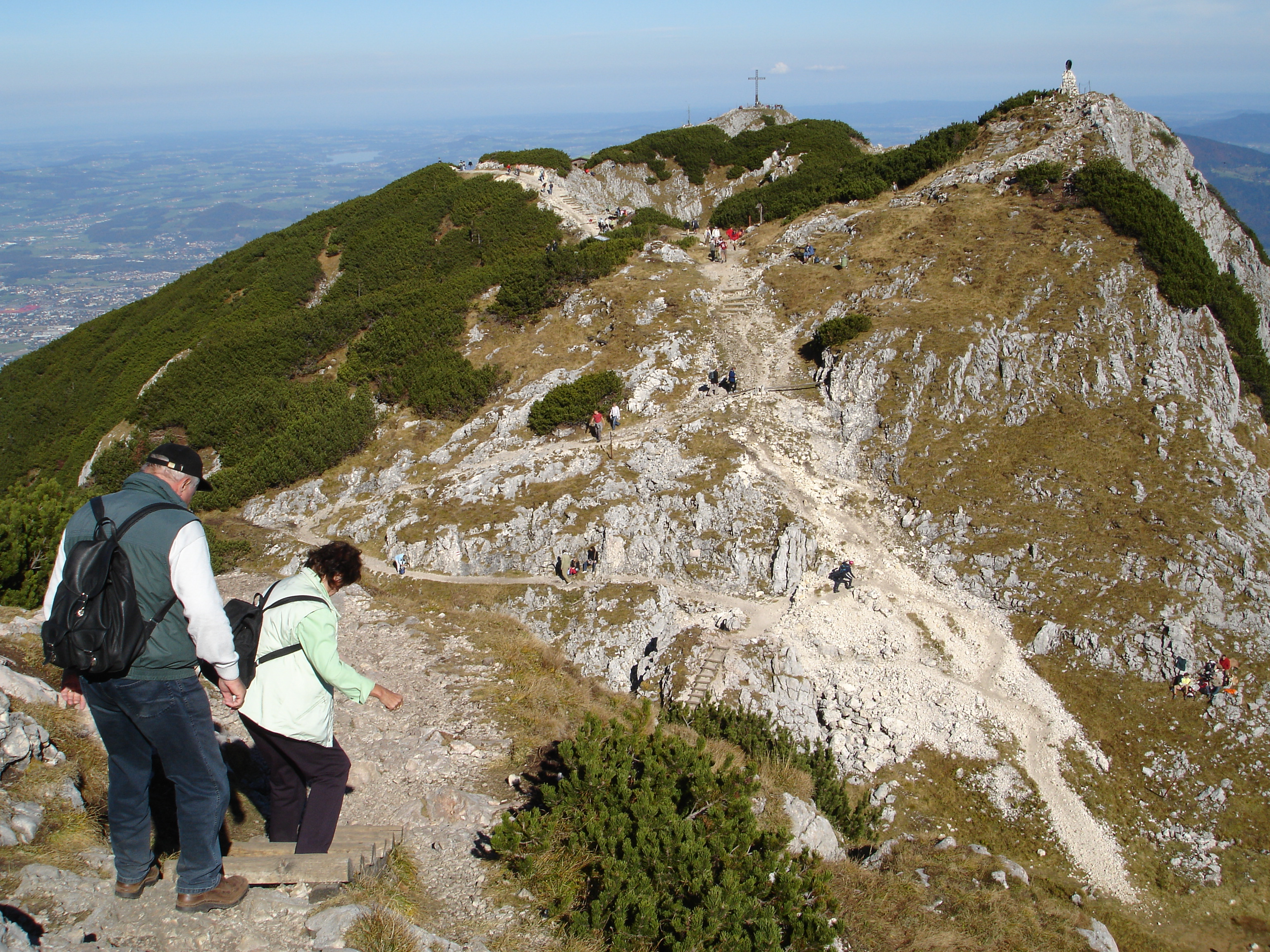
Tourists atop the Untersberg mountain.

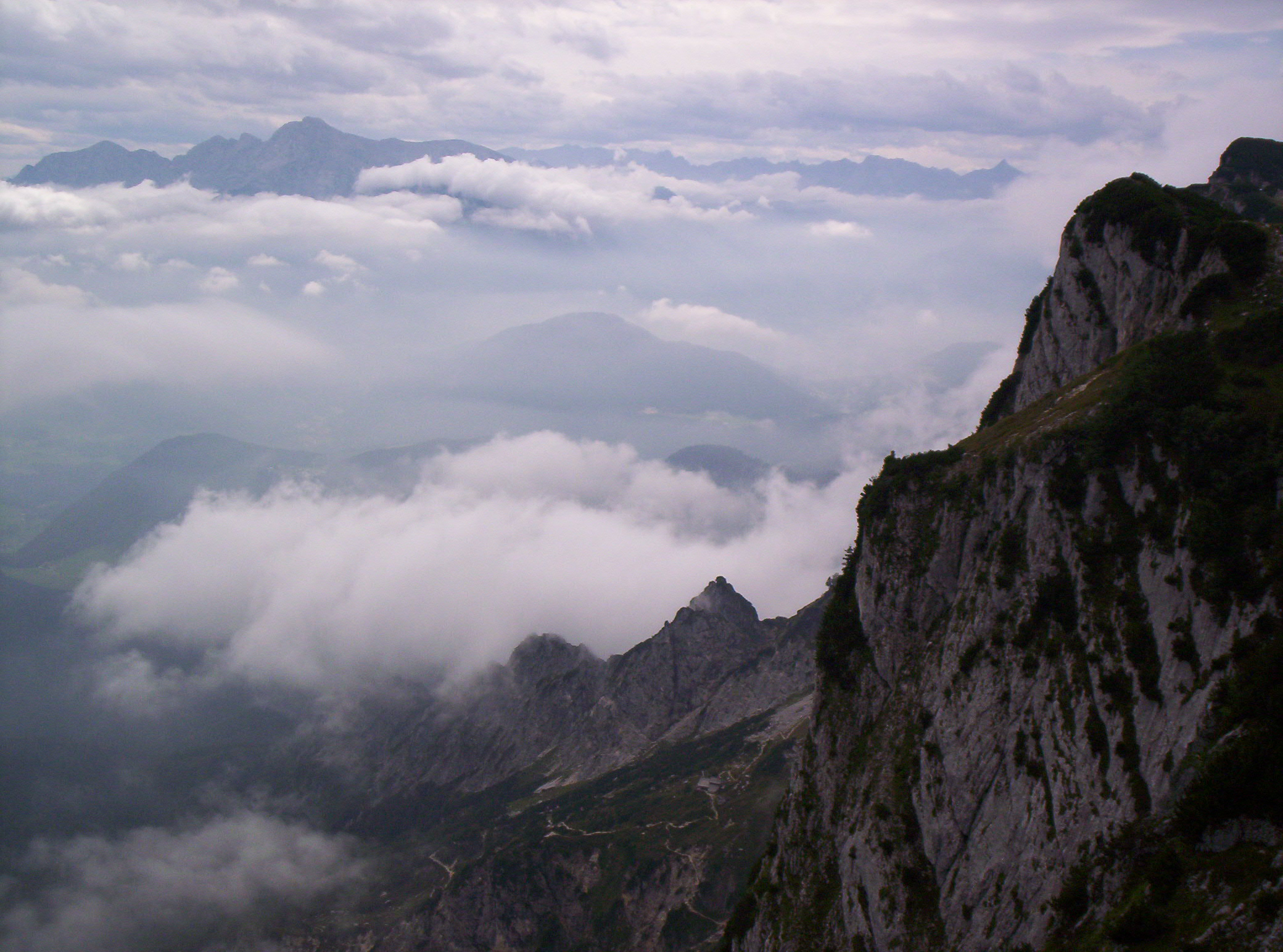
View from Untersberg on a cloudy day.

== See also ==
- Kolowrat cave
- Windlöcher
- Fürstenbrunner Quellhöhle
