= Decorah Ice Cave State Preserve =

Cave in Winnesheik County, Iowa, US

- Decorah Ice Cave
- U.S. National Register of Historic Places
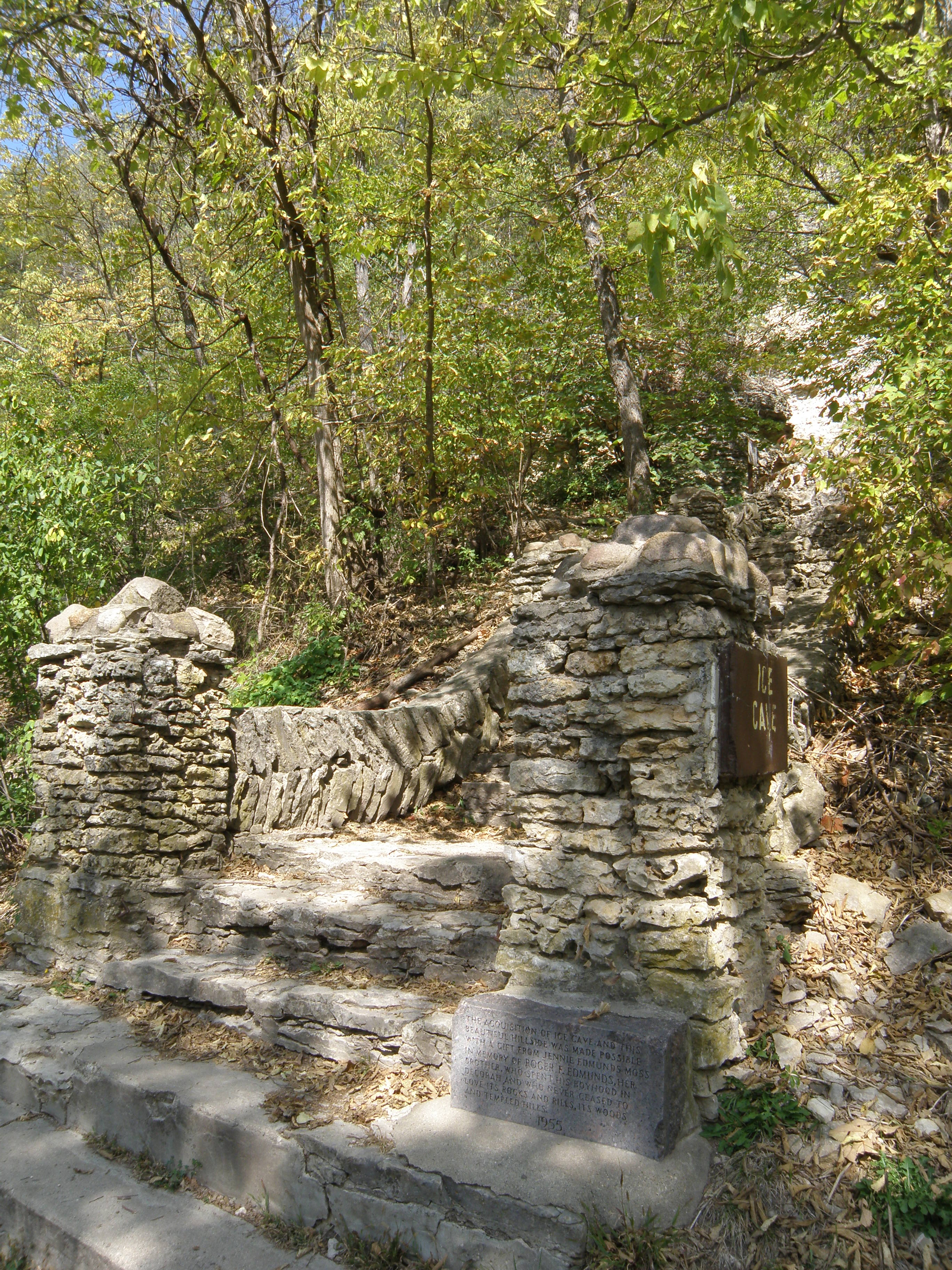

- Location within Iowa Location within the United States
- Location: Ice Cave Rd. Decorah, Iowa
- Coordinates: 43°18′38″N 91°47′3″W
- Area: 2.9 acres (1.2 ha)
- Built: 1898
- NRHP reference No.: 78001269
- Added to NRHP: December 20, 1978

Decorah Ice Cave State Preserve has one of the largest ice caves in the Midwestern United States. It consists of a 3-acre (1.2 ha) parcel of land at the edge of Barbara Barnhart VanPeenen Memorial Park in the northern portion of the city of Decorah, in Winneshiek County, Iowa.

Ice Cave is open to the public as an 'enter at your own risk' attraction. In the late 1990s, the Department of Natural Resources Geological Survey Bureau required a permanent barrier be installed due to some rock movement. Since then, a large rock has fallen and visitors are now only able to comfortably walk into the cave about 10 feet from the entrance.

Ice caves are one characteristic of karst topography, along with sinkholes and cave systems, all of which are present in the area, a portion of the Driftless Area of Iowa. From autumn and into early winter the cave is dry. Ice begins to form in January or February near the entrance and continues down to the lower levels. Several inches of ice on the north wall materializes by late May, and generally remains until late August.

The cave was given to Decorah in 1954 and remains the property of the city. It was declared a state geological state preserve in 1973. It was placed on the National Register of Historic Places in 1978.
