= Riesending Cave =

Pit cave

Coordinates: 47.6994°N 12.9831°E

Riesending Cave

The Riesending Cave (German: Riesending-Schachthöhle) is a pit cave in the Untersberg near Berchtesgaden, Germany, and Salzburg, Austria. At 1,148 m it is the deepest and at 19,300 m the longest cave in Germany. It was discovered in 1996. In June 2014 it became well known because of a large effort to rescue a lead speleologist.

== Description ==
The Riesending Cave (German for "huge thing") is a pit cave in the Untersberg, near Berchtesgaden, Bavaria. At 23,800 m it is the longest and 1,148 m the deepest in Germany. Riesending was discovered in 1996 by Hermann Sommer and Ulrich Meyer.

In June 2014, Riesending became well known to the general public for the largest ever rescue effort, the rescue in the Riesending Cave, taking eleven days by 700 members of a multinational group of cave rescuers to rescue then-52-year-old Johann Westhauser, one of the original and principal researchers of the cave, a physicist, speleologist and cave rescuer himself, who had been injured in a rockfall deep in the cave.

== See also ==
- Schellenberg Ice Cave
- Kolowrat cave
- Windlöcher
- Fürstenbrunner Quellhöhle
