= Booming Ice Chasm =

Cave in Alberta, Canada

- Location within Alberta
- Location: Crowsnest Pass, Alberta, Canada
- Depth: 179 metres (587 ft)
- Length: 961 metres (3,153 ft)
- Discovery: 2005
- Geology: Limestone and shale
- Entrances: 1
- Hazards: Remote, loose scree, lack of infrastructure and steep ice fall
- Features: Ice fall, frozen lake, frozen waterfall, stalagmites and stalactites

Booming Ice Chasm is an ice cave, located in the Crowsnest Pass area of the Rocky Mountains in Alberta, Canada.

The entrance to Booming Ice Chasm was initially found by accident by members of the Alberta Speleological Society while attempting to reach a different cave in June, 2008. It was subsequently explored and mapped by the Alberta Speleological Society. Speleologist Chas Yonge considered that it is the largest ice cave in North America. The main shaft, although an inclined passage that is not completely vertical, is considered Canada's second deepest shaft due to the technical requirements of descent.

It is a cold-trap cave whereby cold air enters through a bottleneck and is never able to escape, generating conditions for perennial ice. The result of this is that the entrance pitch and floor are covered in a dense, cascading glacier-like ice block and there is an underground, frozen waterfall and lake.

It is speculated that Booming Ice Chasm may also hold potential as a source of new super antibiotics. This is because it is thought that a specialised species of microorganisms that have adapted to the closed and nutrient limited conditions of the cave.

== Location ==
Booming Ice Chasm is located on the Southern end of the Continental Divide of the Canadian Rockies, in Alberta. It is approximately 150 kilometre south-southwest of Calgary, Alberta and is situated near the summit of Mount Sentry at an elevation of 2200 metres on the south-side ridge.

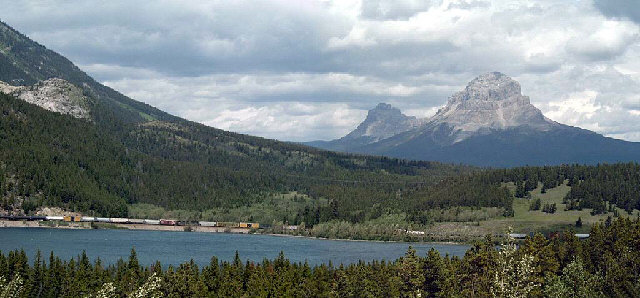
Booming Ice Chasm is located in the Crowsnest Pass area.

It is one of three widely known caving systems in the Crowsnest Pass, along with Gargantua and Cleft Cave. Booming Ice Chasm is also approximately several hundred metres east of another ice cave called Ice Chest.

== Discovery and exploration ==
Booming Ice Chasm was initially identified in 2005, when speleologist Charles (Chas) Yonge came across a black speck on Google Earth. Three years later, it was explored and charted by the Alberta Speleological Society, led by Yonge. While attempting to reach another cave nearby, the entrance was found by Yonge and members of the Alberta Speleological Society in June, 2008. Over the course of 2008, Yonge and other members of the Alberta Speleological Society explored and surveyed the majority of the cave, to a length of 704 meters and depth of 140 meters. Some prominent leads remained after these initial explorations.

Additional exploration in the summer of 2012 continued exploration of unexplored sections of the cave. It was during this exploration that the lowest point in the cave was reached at 179 meters below the entrance.

In 2013, Global News' 16x9 accompanied caver Nicholaus Vieira and a team into the cave, where one of the waterfall ice climbing leads was completed.

In 2015, doing a bolt climbing lead, Kathleen Graham explored further parts of the bottom of the main shaft.

There are passages in the cave, especially on the North and South side, that remain uncharted.

== Cave setting and geological features ==
The surveyed length and depth of Booming Ice Chasm is 961 metres and 179 metres respectively and is ranked the 61st longest and 30th deepest cave in Canada.

On the upper descending part of the cave, near the entrance, is a dense, steeply downward sloping sheet of ice, dropping approximately 140 metres. This is referred to as an ice fall or cascading glacier-like ice block and is controlled by cave morphology and the local climate. Specifically, it is formed by firn and seepage water. Unlike Silica Ice Cave in Slovakia where the ice mass shifts downward on the inclined rock base, in Booming Ice Chasm the ice mass is generally stable within a short range. A similar downward sloping ice block like this is also found in Arnold Ice Cave in the United States of America. The thickness of this ice fall facilitates accessibility to Booming Ice Chasm.

Approximately 140 metres below the entrance, on the cave floor, lies a large chamber that features an underground lake, which is completely frozen over. The depth of the lake is unknown as it is built up of numerous sheets of ice and water. The temperature of the water is just over freezing at 0.4 degrees Celsius.

There is also a large frozen waterfall, located 100 metres from the entrance of the cave. It is a 22-meter ascent, that opens up to unexplored chambers and tight passages, which may lead back to the entrance of the cave.

The mouth of the cave is a few metres wide, which funnels into a pit cave. The entrance walls are lined with hoar frost, snow and loose scree.

The two main types of sedimentary rocks that form the cave are limestone and shale. Other geological features include stalagmites, stalactites, ice crystals, rocks and boulders.

== Climate and formation ==
There are two conditions for Booming Ice Chasm to be characterised as an ice cave and in turn what maintains and creates the perennial ice wall, frozen waterfall and frozen lake all found in the cave.

Firstly, it must be a cold-trap cave. This is a phenomenon that only occurs when a body of very cold air essentially becomes trapped by a bottleneck within the cave, neither being able to move freely nor being able to escape. The principal reason for this is that heavier, colder air entering through the top of the cave, sinks downwards through the bottleneck to the lower reaches of the cave. As it does, it displaces warmer, more buoyant air which naturally rises and exits the mouth of Booming Ice Chasm. As the warmer air escapes into the atmosphere, it is replaced by a new current of cold air that enters the cave in small circular flows creating an air flow system similar to swirling eddies in a stream, known as eddy currents. As a result, Booming Ice Chasm is insulated from external warm air, maintaining temperatures within Booming Ice Chasm to less than freezing all year around.

Secondly, the ice itself is slowly expanded by the cumulative action of low levels of precipitation, seepage and drip water throughout the year. The ice floor is incrementally added to, as small amounts of water from occasional seasonal rain falls or melted snow, drips or seeps into the cave. These small amounts of moisture fall downwards and freeze over existing ice surfaces to form a new thin, ice layer on the walls and frozen lake floor. This is repeated throughout the year according to seasonality of water sources.

A map by caver, Nicholaus Vieira shows downward sloping paleo currents that indicates these types of incremental water flows. Accumulated snow fall at the summit of Mount Sentry, at the entrance of the Booming Ice Chasm, may facilitate this further.

== Biological value ==
It is speculated by microbiologist and Professor in the Department of Biological Sciences at Thompson Rivers University, Naowarat (Ann) Cheeptham, that Booming Ice Chasm may hold potential as a source of new super antibiotics. This is a question which biologists and speleologists are seeking to address. In particular, it is believed that there are potentially specialised species of micro-organisms that have adapted to and thrived in the closed environment of Booming Ice Chasm. These species are considered to be dominant and may hold significant pharmacological potential as a potent weapon against antibiotic-resistant infections.

There are two climate and formation characteristics of Booming Ice Chasm, which have created a closed environment and in turn may have led to this potential existence of these specialised species of micro-organisms. The first of these is the microclimate, that is, the localised set of climatic conditions that exist in the cave itself as distinct from its surroundings. The closed nature of Booming Ice Chasm's physical and atmospheric systems means that the microclimate is stable or controlled, not in a constant state of change, throughout the year. The second factor is the lack of plants, which in most environments form the basis of food chains and microbial activity, thereby implying limited nutrients in Booming Ice Chasm. The combination of limited nutrients and the quantities of essential elements such as carbon, hydrogen and nitrogen in ice caves, has implications for the type of micro-organisms or microbes that may exist in these closed environments.

Cheeptham pursued this opportunity by having Nicholaus Vieira plant petri dishes in Booming Ice Chasm for one month and collecting bacteria specimens for research. The bacteria is then screened against superbugs.

The research has continued with sediments collected more recently by Christian Stenner and Adam Walker to assist in Cheeptham's research.

During an expedition in 2019, Sediments from the cave were collected by Katie Graham and Christian Stenner and sent to NASA Johnson Space Centre and the University of Alberta. The purpose of the research involves determining the mechanisms for colonization and survival by microbial communities in dark, nutrient poor (oligotrophic) environments, and for Metagenomic studies and collecting genomes of bacteria to add to the database.

== Hazards and tourism ==
The cave itself also presents a number of hazards in terms of initial access and subsequent utility.

Booming Ice Chasm is located in a relatively remote part of the province of Alberta in Canada. The closest town is Coleman, a very small township located approximately 522 kilometres from Alberta's capital, Edmonton and can only be reached by road. Access to Booming Ice Chasm from Coleman is along a 10 kilometre stretch of highway to Mount Sentry. Beyond the general location, there is no specifically marked trail nor an established access route leading to the cave's exact location. Access to the cave itself is not through a ground level entry way as the entrance must be accessed by specialty equipped climbers via a 700 vertical metre ascent up Mount Sentry, an ascent made more hazardous by a covering of loose scree across Mount Sentry's face. The entrance to the cave is concealed behind a rocky ledge and regarded as nearly impossible to find. Despite an area marked out on the high ride south of the summit for helicopter landings, there is a complete lack of supportive infrastructure.

The mouth of the cave gives way to a steep 140 metre downward slope of thick ice. Given the steepness of the slope, the smoothness of the ice and the lack of restraining objects on the descent, dropping an object or falling on the ice can also pose a risk for climbers. Consistent with this, animals are often found dead at the bottom of the cave.

The only accessible map of Booming Ice Chasm, created by caver Nicholaus Vieira in 2013, has a UIS grade of 4. According to the Survey and Mapping Working Group, UIS Informatics Commission, 2012, this correlates to a mapping description that although providing significant detail in measurements, still retain an error ratio of 5%, such that it may be sufficiently inaccurate so as to pose physical hazards.

The climate of Mount Sentry also presents several hazards for greater scale exploration and potential for development of commercial activities, with high pressure systems, sub-zero temperatures and strong winds.

Another hazard is the hollow structure of Booming Ice Chasm, which amplifies all sounds made inside the cave. This can cause communicating inside Booming Ice Chasm to be very difficult.

Exploration and tourism in Booming Ice Chasm is undeveloped and expert opinion from photographer Francois-Xavier De Ruydts, who has joined multiple expeditions in Booming Ice Chasm suggests that tourism should be actively discouraged given the fragility and unique nature of this geological formation.

== Media ==
Coverage in popular media has exposed the cave to audiences around the world. Online and print journalism has included Macleans and Global 16x9.

Film director Francois-Xavier De Ruydts' documentary, Terres d'Exploration explores remote locations of Canada, with each episode focusing on a different type of landscape. The first episode of season two, 'Grottes: Le Monde sous nos pieds', investigates Booming Ice Chasm, as well as neighbouring cave, White Rabbit.

The actual filming for the episode on Booming Ice Chasm took three days. Christian Stenner and Adam Walker were filmed collecting sediment samples to support research into antibiotic resistance. In order to secure the camera on the angled ice fall, De Ruydts uses fastened tennis balls to the leg of each tripod, such that the felt sticks to the ice. LED lights were used to illuminate the cave for the video shoot.

The episode was released on May 7, 2018. It runs for 52 minutes and is rated G - General on the Canadian Home Video Rating System.

== Etymology ==
The name Booming Ice Chasm refers to both its characterisation as an ice cave and the quality of sound created by its physical structures. The 'booming' is derived from the acoustics of the cave. The relative hollowness of Booming Ice Chasm creates a closed system chamber which not only amplifies all sounds but creates a ringing echo affect. This renders conversing in normal tones inside the cave very difficult. As a result, communication and radio usage is limited to a whisper and necessary syllables only.
