= Ice cave =

Natural cave that contains significant amounts of year-round ice

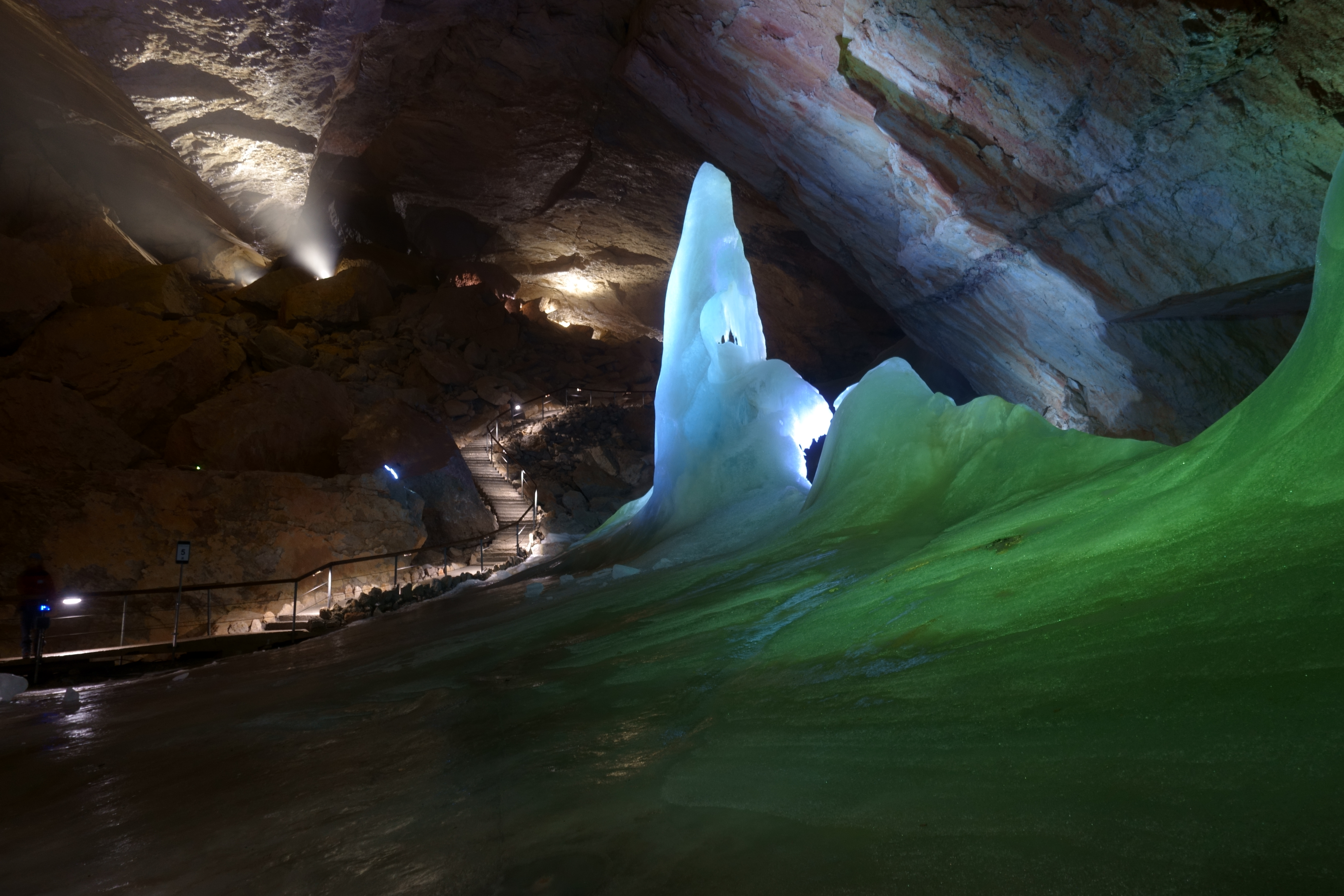
Dachstein-Rieseneishöhle (de) in Austria

An ice cave is any type of natural cave (most commonly lava tubes or limestone caves) that contains significant amounts of perennial (year-round) ice. At least a portion of the cave must have a temperature below 0 °C (32 °F) all year round, and water must have traveled into the cave’s cold zone.

== Terminology ==
This type of cave was first formally described by Englishman Edwin Swift Balch in 1900, who suggested the French term glacieres should be used for them, even though the term ice cave was then, as now, commonly used to refer to caves simply containing year-round ice. Among speleologists, ice cave is the proper English term.

A cavity formed within ice (as in a glacier) is properly called a glacier cave.

== Types ==
Ice caves occur as static ice caves, such as Peña Castil Ice Cave, and dynamic or cyclical ice caves, such as Eisriesenwelt.

== Temperature mechanisms ==
In most of the world, bedrock caves are thermally insulated from the surface and so commonly assume a near-constant temperature approximating the annual average temperature at the surface. In some cold environments, such as that surrounding Mount Erebus, average surface (and thus cave) temperatures are below freezing, and with surface water available in summer, ice caves are possible and are sometimes overlain by fumarolic ice towers. However, many ice caves exist in temperate climates, due to mechanisms that result in cave temperatures being colder than average surface temperatures where they formed.

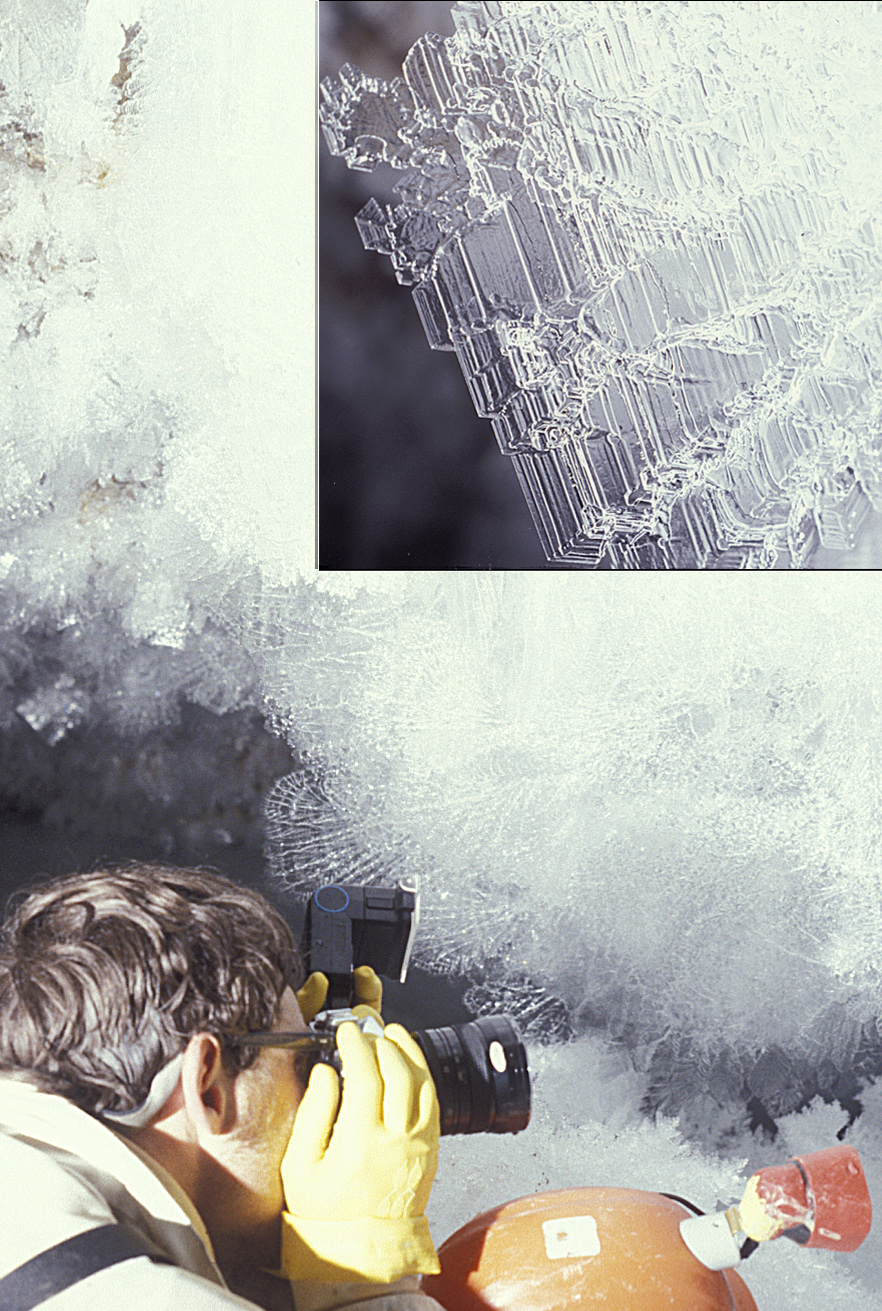
Ice plates

Cold traps: Certain cave configurations allow seasonal convection to import cold air from the surface in winter, but not warm air in summer. A typical example is an underground chamber located below a single entrance. In winter, cold dense air settles into the cave, displacing any warmer air which rises and exits the cave. In summer, the cold cave air remains in place as the relatively warm surface air is lighter and cannot enter. The cave will only exchange air when the surface air is cooler than the cave air. Some cold traps may ensnare surface snow and shade it from the summer sun’s rays, which may further contribute to the colder cave temperature.

Permafrost: Even temperate environments can include pockets of bedrock that are below freezing year round, a condition called permafrost. For example, winter wind and an absence of snow cover may allow freezing deep enough to be protected from summer thaw, particularly in light-colored rock that does not readily absorb heat. Although the portion of a cave within this permafrost zone will be below freezing, permafrost generally does not allow water percolation, so ice formations are often limited to crystals from vapor, and deeper cave passages may be arid and completely ice-free. Ice caves in permafrost need not be cold-traps (although some are), provided they do not draught significantly in summer.

Evaporative cooling: In winter, dry surface air entering a moisture-saturated cave may have an additional cooling effect due to the latent heat of evaporation. This may create a zone within the cave that is cooler than the rest of the cave. Because many caves have seasonally-reversing draughts, the corresponding warming of the cave through condensation in summer may occur at a different location within the cave, but in any event a moisture-saturated cave environment is likely to experience much more evaporative cooling than condensative warming.

== Types of ice ==
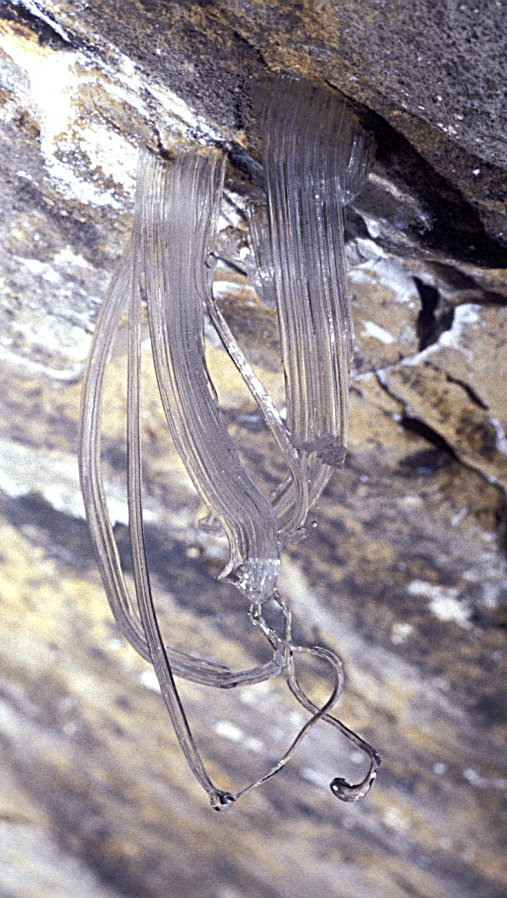
Needle ice extrusions

Different freezing mechanisms result in visually and structurally distinct types of perennial cave ice.

Ponded water: Surface water that collects and ponds in a cave before freezing will form a clear ice mass, and can be tens of metres thick and of great age. Large ice masses are plastic and can slowly flow in response to gravity or pressure from further accumulations. Sculpting from air flow and sublimation may reveal ancient accumulation bands within the ice.

Accumulated snow: Compressed under the weight of ongoing accumulations, snow sliding or falling into a cave entrance may eventually form ice that is coarsely crystalline, akin to glacier ice. True underground glaciers are rare.

Ice formations: Water that freezes before ponding may form icicles, ice-stalagmites, ice columns or frozen waterfalls.

Airborne moisture (water vapor): Freezing vapor can form frost crystals, frost feathers and two-dimensional ice plates on the cave walls and ceiling.

Needle ice: Infiltrating water that freezes within the bedrock can sometimes be forced into the cave passage.

Intrusions: The weight of a surface glacier perched atop a cave entrance can force glacial ice a short distance into the cave. The only known examples of this phenomenon are the several 'ice plugs' at the back of Castleguard Cave in Alberta.

== Examples ==
- Bandera Volcano Ice Cave (New Mexico, United States)
- Bixby State Preserve (Iowa, United States)
- Booming Ice Chasm (Alberta, Canada)
- Bortig Pit Cave (Apuseni Mountains, Romania)
- Canyon Creek Ice Cave (Alberta, Canada)
- Castleguard Cave (Alberta, Canada)
- Coudersport Ice Mine (Pennsylvania, United States)
- Decorah Ice Cave State Preserve (Iowa, United States)
- Demänovská Ice Cave (Slovakia)
- Dobšiná Ice Cave (Slovakia) UNESCO World Heritage site (2000)
- Eisriesenwelt (Werfen, Austria)
- Grotta del Gelo (Sicily, Italy)
- Grotte Casteret (Aragon, Spanish Pyrenees)
- Ice Mountain (West Virginia, United States)
- Kungur Ice Cave (Perm Krai, Russia)
- Merrill Cave (Lava Beds National Monument, California, United States)
- Narusawa Ice Cave, (Mount Fuji, Japan)
- Niter Ice Cave (Idaho, United States)
- Sam's Point Preserve (New York, United States)
- Scărișoara Cave (Romania)
- Schellenberg Ice Cave (Bavaria, Germany)
- Shawangunk Ridge (New York, United States)
- Víðgelmir (West Iceland)
