= French Federation of Speleology =

- Fédération française de spéléologie
- Abbreviation: FFS
- Formation: 1 June 1963; 63 years ago
- Founders: Albert Cavaillé, B. Chatelain, Noëlle Chochon, Paul Dubois, René Ehinger, G. Garby, Jean-Jacques Garnier, J. Lautier, Guy de Lavaur, Michel Letrône, Géo Marchand, J.-C. Marie, A. Munier, Roger Nuffer, J. Paloumé, C. Peltier, Claude Pommier, Philippe Renault, J.-L. Roudil, Henri Salvayre, Roger Séronie-Vivien and Jean Thomas
- Merger of: Société spéléologique de France (SSF) and Comité national de spéléologie (CNS)
- Purpose: Representation of speleology; Promotion of youth and popular education; Promotion of environmental protection; Promotion of outdoor safety
- Headquarters: 28 Rue Delandine, Lyon (Rhône)
- Coordinates: 45.7450°N 4.8256°E
- Region served: France
- Members: 7,853 (2014)
- Official language: French
- Secretary General: Dominique Lasserre
- President: Laurence Tanguille
- Vice-President: Jean-Pierre Holvoët
- Treasurer: José Prévot
- Publication: Spelunca, quarterly newsletter; Karstologia, biannual newsletter (in association with the French Association of Karstology (AFK) and the French National Centre for Scientific Research)
- Affiliations: European Speleological Federation (FSE); International Union of Speleology (UIS)
- Staff: 6
- Website: ffspeleo.fr

The French Federation of Speleology (Fédération Française de Spéléologie, FFS), is a French organisation that represents all persons practicing or studying caving and canyoning and promotes the study and conservation of caves.

It was formed in 1963 by the amalgamation of two organisations, the Comité national de spéléologie (CNS), or National Committee of Speleology, and the Société spéléologique de France (SSF), or Speleological Society of France.

== History ==
=== Société de spéléologie (1895–1914) ===
Founded by Édouard-Alfred Martel in 1895, the Société de spéléologie was the first organisation of its kind in Europe. Between 1895 and 1900 the society published a journal entitled Spelunca. The society folded in 1914 at the start of World War I.

=== Spéléo-club de France (1930–1936) ===
After the First World War, French speleology was represented mainly by Norbert Casteret and Robert de Joly, who continued the interrupted work of Martel's Société de spéléologie.

On 18 March 1930, an organisational meeting led to the creation of the Spéléo-club de France, whose headquarters were set up at Montpellier, in the headquarters of the Department of Agriculture. Members of the organisation included: Martel (Honorary Chairman), de Joly (Chairman), Degrully (Vice President), Casteret, Bernard Gèze, l'Abbé Giry, Guy de Lavaur, Fournier, Milhau and Contejean, among others. The goal of the club was to liaise between cavers and help develop the activities of miners underground. The association offered assistance (including financial) to cavers and prepared special legislation for the exploration, discovery and exploitation of underground systems.

The Spéléo-club de France published a quarterly newsletter and a Spelunca journal (2nd series) for the publication of scientific papers and detailed accounts of exploration.

=== Société spéléologique de France (1936–1963) ===
On 1 March 1936, proposed by Bernard Gèze, the Spéléo-club de France became the Société spéléologique de France (SSF), residing in Nîmes at the Natural History Museum. The intention was to give national status to a hitherto only regional group. The SSF admitted subsidiaries and affiliates. It also continued the publication of Spelunca. The first national speleological conference took place in Mazamet in 1939.

Unlike the First World War, the war of 1939–1945 saw no cessation of underground exploration. However, in 1944, the caves served as refuges for members of the French Resistance. Volume X of the Spelunca 2nd series was published during German occupation. After the war, the face of French caving had completely changed. The SSF was no longer the only national association: the Club alpin français (CAF) had also begun speleological exploration and had made many significant discoveries.

In 1945, various government agencies recognised the value of groundwater studies:

- The Centre national de la recherche scientifique (CNRS) established a commission of speleology including Fage, Gèze, René Jeannel, Félix Trombe, Vandel, etc., who founded a laboratory of biospeology in the Muséum national d'Histoire naturelle in Paris;
- The Bureau des recherches géologiques et géophysiques (BRGG, later BRGM), or the Bureau of Geological and Geophysical Research, was entrusted by Gèze with the task of drawing up an inventory of cavities (work by Rouire resumed in 1948);
- The Comité national français de géodésie et de géophysique, or the French National Committee of Geodesy and Geophysics, contained a section for hydrology on which cavers were present (Bourgin, Norbert Casteret, Bernard Gèze and Félix Trombe).

With the help of these organisations and with support from well-known names such as Bernard Gèze, in 1946 the Annales de spéléologie began publication, under the double label of the SSF and the CAF. This was the 3rd series of Spelunca.

In 1948, the headquarters of the SSF were transferred to those of the BRGG. The CNRS provided financial support for publications from 1947 to 1956, when the CNRS began producing its own edition of the Annales de spéléologie, which became the publication of the Laboratoire de Moulis until 1976. The title Spelunca remained the property of the SSF and the Comité national de spéléologie.

=== Comité national de spéléologie (1948–1963) ===
In 1948 after the end of World War II, René Jeannel, known for his research in biospeleology with Emil Racoviţă, founded a commission of speleology within the Centre national de la recherche scientifique (CNRS).

On 28 May 1948, Jeannel met in Paris with the presidents of the clubs known to cavers as well as various eminent speleologists, under the auspices of the CNRS. This was the birth of the Comité national de spéléologie (CNS), whose headquarters was established at the Muséum national d'Histoire naturelle in Paris. The CNS consisted of the chairpersons of speleological organisations and some exceptional personalities who had "contributed in particular, for their work in the development of French caving". The inaugural committee comprised 21 organisation representatives or individuals, most of whom were scientists. Among the members was Robert de Joly, as well as the then Minister of Youth Affairs and Sports, Pierre Bourdan.

Members the first committee and the first office:

- President: René Jeannel
- Vice-President: Pierre Chevalier
- Secretary: Guy de Lavaur

Since the body's inception, members of the CNS knew that they needed to produce a publication in which to express their developments. In 1948, the newsletter Grottes et gouffres appeared in three issues. Facing difficulties, the publication was stopped in favour of the Bulletin de la Société spéléologique de France (SSF), which was produced between 1949 and 1950. Finally, the organisation established contact with the CAF and the SSF, which were publishing the Annales de spéléologie, and organised a quarterly liaison from 1951 and for the following 10 years, named the Bulletin of the CNS. Simultaneously, the SSF ceased publication of its periodical bulletin to provide its official information bulletin in the new CNS.

From 1952, cave training courses were organised in partnership with the Ministry of Youth Affairs and Sports.

From 1953, Guy Lavaur organised cave diving activities. In conjunction with the Fédération nationale de sauvetage (National Rescue Federation), a certificate of first degree fitness was created in 1954.

The first International Congress of Speleology was held in Paris from 7–12 September 1953 under the patronage of the Minister of National Education, as well as the Minister for Youth Affairs and Sports. This dual sponsorship was intended to mark the recognition of both scientific and recreational caving. The conference consisted of seven sections of work: hydrogeology and karst morphology, physical chemistry, meteorology and crystallography, biology, human habitat, surveying and topography, photo and film and equipment and techniques of exploration. More than one hundred papers and a dozen films were presented.

In 1957, an amendment was made to the constitution of the CNS making it an association of clubs (not club presidents), to the exclusion of individual members. The financial situation became extremely difficult, firstly because of its intense activity and partly because of the production of numerous publications including the Proceedings of the International Congress of 1953.

At the general meeting of the CNS appointed 10 May 1958, Geo Marchand was designated to organise the 2nd National Congress of Speleology in Cahors in 1959, with the group Spéléologique du Quercy, of which he was President. Three hundred cavers from the CNS and the SSF took part in the event, from 6–10 September 1959. It gave rise to the presentation of 26 papers and five different films and inspired in the participants a desire for unification.

The year 1961 was particularly active, and saw the first Bulletin of the CNS take the name of Spelunca (4th series), under the double patronage CNS-SSF.

=== French Federation of Speleology (1963 onwards) ===
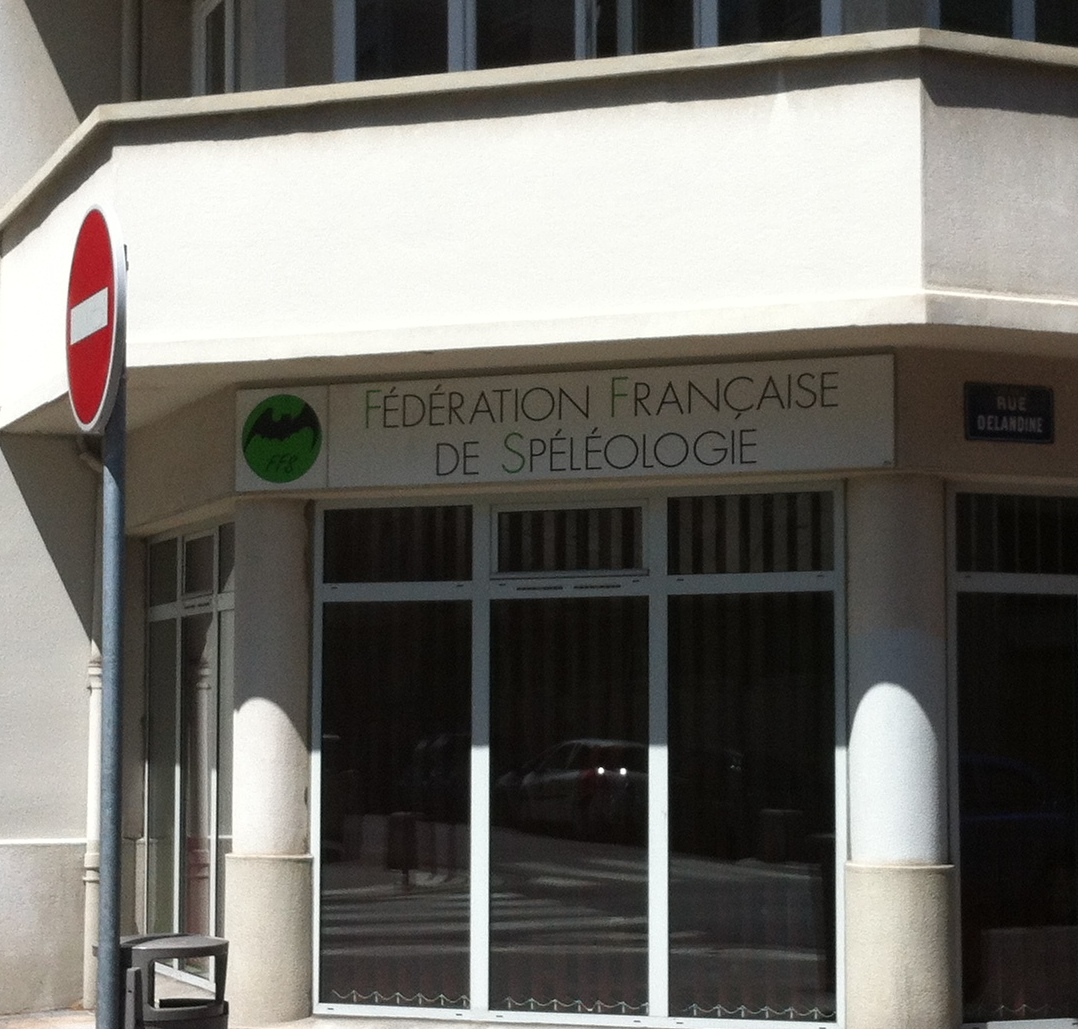
Headquarters of the FFS in Lyon.

After their respective general assemblies on 25 and 26 November 1961, the Comité national de spéléologie (CNS) and the Société spéléologique de France (SSF), decided to create a joint commission covering all of caving and speleology. After a consultation of cavers on 1 June 1963, at the national convention of Millau, the CNS and SSF assembled to form the French Federation of Speleology (FFS).

On 3 June 1963, the new board elected the first office of the federation, which was composed of:

- President: André Cavaillé
- Vice-President: Guy de Lavaur and Paul Dubois
- Secretary: Geo Marchand (now honorary president of the FFS)
- Assistant Secretary: Jean Lautier
- Treasurer: René Nuffer
- Assistant Treasurer : Claude Pommier

The FFS then resumed publication of the Spelunca 4th series newsletter with four issues per year. In 1981, printing began on the current (5th) series of Spelunca, with a new format and numbering system.

The FFS has gradually emerged as an entity representative of French caving. It is now delegated public tasks in the field of education, civil protection and promotion of caving practice in all its forms. It has maintained a membership of approximately 7,500 for the last ten years.
