= Norbert Casteret =

French caver and writer (1897–1987)

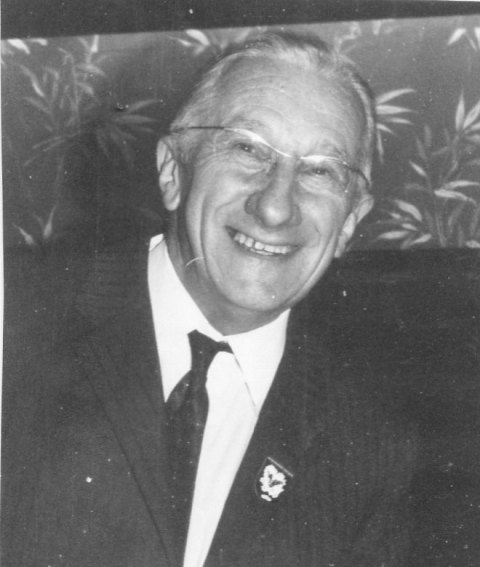
- Born: 19 August 1897; Saint-Martory, France
- Died: 20 July 1987 (aged 89); Toulouse, France
- Known for: Cave diver and explorer

Norbert Casteret (19 August 1897 – 20 July 1987) was a famous French caver, adventurer and writer, and is one of the most recognisable names in caving worldwide. Following Édouard-Alfred Martel (the "father of modern speleology", although Casteret sometimes also enjoys this title), Casteret, along with Robert de Joly, became a leading figure of French speleology between the world wars and into the middle of the 20th century.

== Biography ==
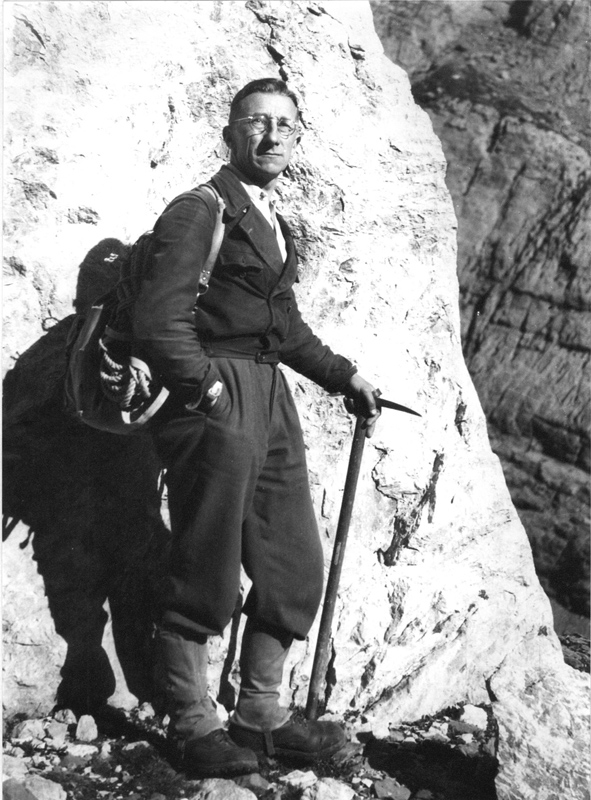
Casteret in 1932

Norbert Casteret was born in Saint-Martory in Haute-Garonne on 19 August 1897. His father, Henry Casteret, was a lawyer in Toulouse. His brothers were Roger, who died at the age of four, Jean and Martial Casteret, a physician who accompanied his brother on some of his explorations.

An all-round athlete and accomplished mountaineer, Casteret began caving in 1912, spanning the era of matches and candles into the age of electric lights. Unlike de Joly, who made caving his profession, Casteret was more the amateur adventurer (albeit a very knowledgeable one).

Casteret served in the French infantry for three years during World War I, serving in his brother Jean's regiment. After being demobilized in 1919, he contracted the Spanish flu. He kept the helmet and lamp he used in the trenches for future use in caving.

Upon his return from the front, at his father's urging Casteret studied law and became a notary's clerk, a position he quickly abandoned. In 1924, Casteret met his future wife, Élisabeth (born 13 May 1905), a doctor's daughter who ended her medical education after their marriage the same year. She later accompanied Casteret on many of his explorations, including the expedition to find the true source of the Garonne. The couple had five children: Gilberte, Raoul, Maud, Raymonde and Marie. Élisabeth died on 6 May 1940 of puerperal fever, a few days after the birth of their youngest child.

Casteret's motto was the Latin phrase Ad Augusta per Angusta (through difficulties to greatness).

Casteret died in Toulouse on 20 July 1987, at age 89.

== Caving career ==
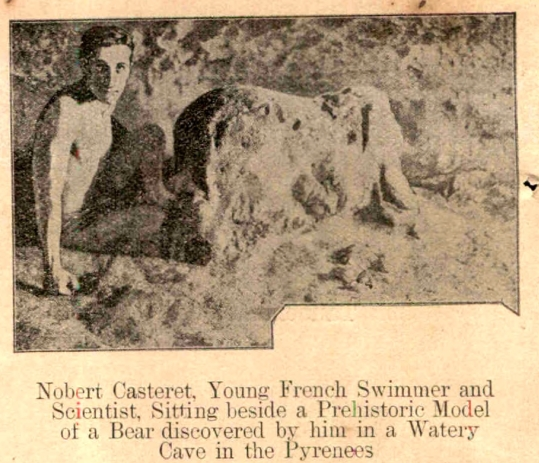
Casteret in 1924

Casteret's fame began with a bold free-dive in the Grotte de Montespan (French) in 1923, which led to the discovery of prehistoric cave drawings on the far side. He went on to undertake many important cave explorations, including the caves of Marboré, including Grotte Casteret, in 1926, the Grotte de Labastide in 1931, Cigalère in 1931, Gouffre Martel (−303 metres (−994 ft)) in 1933, Henne Morte (thought to be −446 metres (−1,463 ft), corrected to −358 metres (−1,175 ft)) in 1947, and the Gouffre de la Pierre Saint-Martin (−689 metres (−2,260 ft)) in 1952–3 where his teammate Marcel Loubens died after a winch failure on the entrance shaft. (Note: Depths in parentheses were French depth-records at the time.)

Casteret's popularity grew in the 1940s and 1950s, in part from his prolific writing – hundreds of articles, and more than 40 books with numerous reprintings in French and translations into several languages. Two of his best-known works, Dix ans sous terre (1933) and Au fond des gouffres (1936) were combined and translated into English by Barrows Mussey as Ten Years Under the Earth in 1939.

My Caves, translated from the French by R. L. G. Irving, was published in London by J.M. Dent & Sons in 1947, followed by The Darkness Under The Earth, in 1954.

== See also ==
- Grotte Casteret
