= Riesending Cave rescue =

2014 rescue operation in Germany

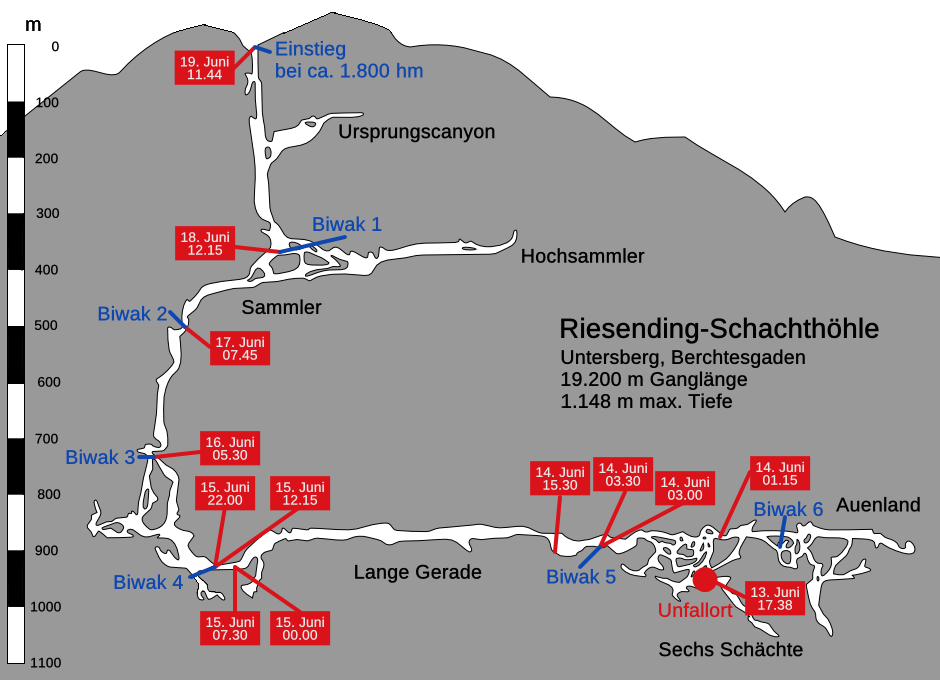
- Rescue of the patient inside the "Riesending"
- Date: 8 June 2014 to 19 June 2014
- Location: Riesending Cave; 47.6994°N 12.9831°E
- Cause: Rockfall
- Participants: German speleologist Johann Westhauser and two colleagues, more than 700 rescue personnel
- Outcome: Successful rescue with full recovery

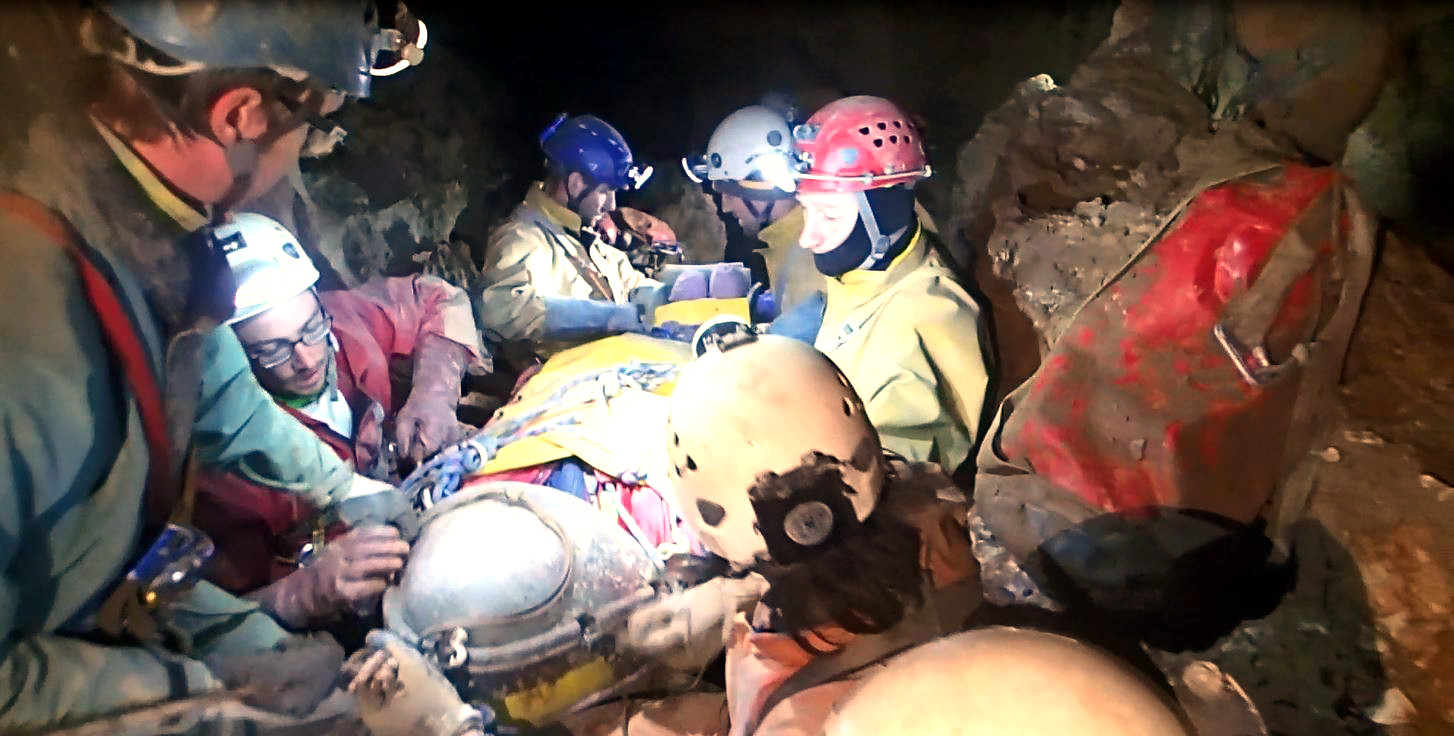
Transport of the patient inside the "Riesending"

A rescue occurred at Riesending Cave between 8–19 June 2014, in Bavaria, Germany, after a speleologist who had been exploring the cave in a group of three suffered a traumatic brain injury as a result of a rockfall. It became one of the largest cave rescues in history, involving more than 700 people for 11 days and an estimated cost of close to €1 million. The rescue left more than one ton of garbage inside the cave, which took six years to retrieve and dispose.

== Events ==
=== Descending and accident ===
Around noon on 7 June 2014, speleologist and caver Johann Westhauser and two colleagues descended into the Riesending Cave, the deepest and longest pit cave in Germany, located in the south-eastern edge of the country on the border with Austria. It is known to be "technically challenging from the first metres on". The next day, 8 June, Westhauser was hit by rockfall around 1:30 am and suffered brain trauma despite wearing a helmet. At this time, the team had already descended about 1,000 meters (3,280 feet) down the cave. As there is no radio or cell phone reception inside, while one of the teammates stayed with Westhauser, the second person started his 10 hour ascent towards the entrance, a distance of around 6 km (3.72 miles). After reaching daylight and making the urgent call, emergency procedures were initiated.

=== Rescue operations ===
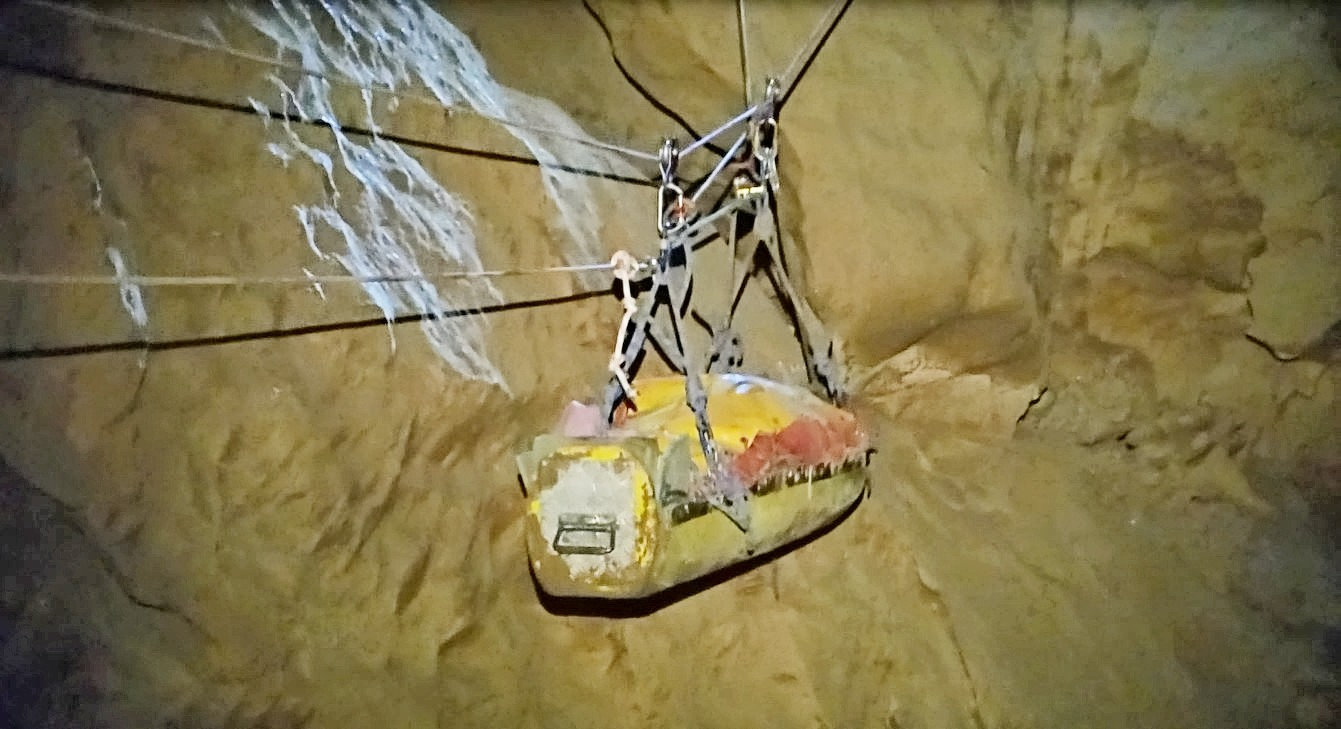
Transport of the stretcher

On the same evening, three groups of cave rescuers, eleven people in total, entered the cave to make their way towards Westhauser and the remaining teammate. A cave-link system was established to send and receive basic communication signals through solid rock, allowing the exchange of text messages between the cave entrance and the scene of the accident. Further mountain rescue teams from Germany and Austria reached the scene, supported by State and Federal Police helicopters. On the evening of 11 June, a physician Martin Göksu, was able to reach the patient. A minor traumatic brain injury was diagnosed and together with a second physician arriving later at night, it was decided that Westhauser was fit to be transported. The paths within the cave had to be secured with additional fixed ropes, bolts and footrests. At peak times, up to 60 people were in the cave and 90% of all cave rescue equipment of the Bavarian mountain rescue, Bergwacht, had been fitted.

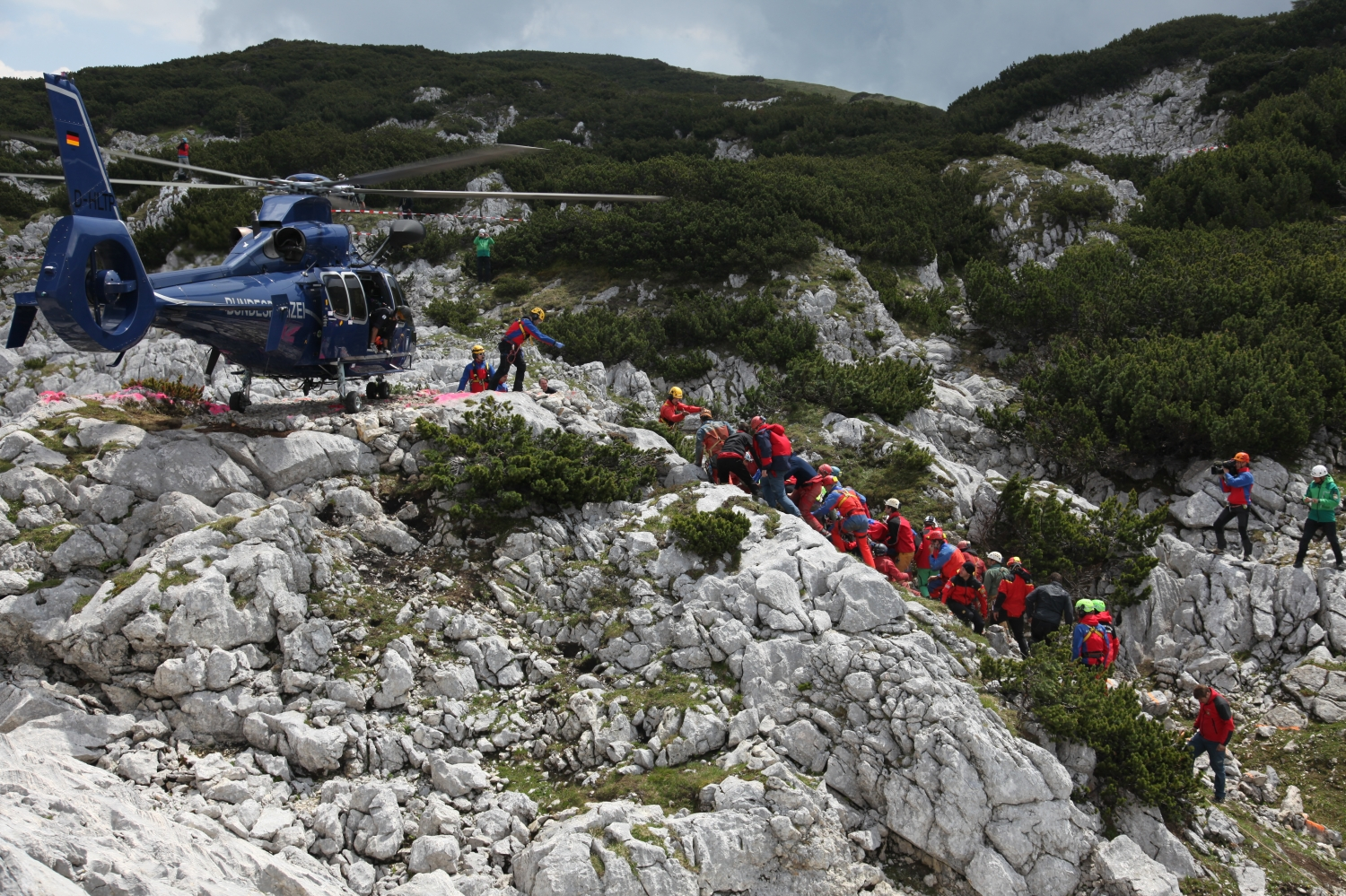
Rescued explorer Westhauser being brought to a German Federal Police helicopter evacuating him to the trauma hospital in Murnau

The transport through the narrow passages and supplies for the large number of people inside and outside the cave was challenging. Everything had to be done by hand since engines and other machinery could not be used. Westhauser's condition remained stable over the several days of rescue operations. A stretcher was adapted to be shock-proof to a certain extent. In vertical passages, the rescue staff used their own bodies as a counterweight to the stretcher. On 19 June at 11:44 am, they reached the surface and exited the Riesending with the help of a manual winch. Westhauser was then transported to the trauma hospital in Murnau via helicopter.

=== Aftermath ===
The operation became well known to the general public for the large rescue effort and was called a "chapter of alpine rescue history", taking eleven days by more than 700 members of a multinational group of cave rescuers, consisting of people from Italy, Austria, Germany, Switzerland, Croatia and others. In August 2015, the interior ministry of Bavaria reported that the costs were estimated around 960,000 Euros, while the victim himself would be "taking responsibility for a substantial amount".

At the end of June 2014, the entrance to the cave was sealed by police to prevent further accidents by curious people and tourists. A special permit is now required and only issued to people with justified interest, physical suitability and professional qualification.

By 2016, Westhauser had recovered from his injuries and slowly began starting to explore caves again.

It took until 2020, six years after the rescue, to clean up the cave; more than one ton of garbage from the rescue were brought to the surface: food scraps, plastic packaging, drills, batteries and medical material. This was important for the ecosystem of the cave, because debris and hazardous substances in caves can pollute the groundwater and the habitat of bats and other cave animals.

== See also ==
- Tham Luang cave rescue - In Thailand, 12 boys and their coach were trapped in the Tham Luang Cave after heavy monsoon downpour flooded the cave, preventing them from leaving. (2018)
- Riesending – Jede Stunde zählt 2022 movie by Jochen Alexander Freydank and Johannes W. Betz about the event [part 1: 1:28:25, part 2: 1:28:16]
