= List of caves in France =

The following article shows a List of caves in France:

== Caves ==
- Aven Armand
- Bédeilhac Cave
- Bétharram Caves
- Bournillon Cave, the highest cave opening in Europe.
- Bruniquel Cave, an archaeological site dated at 176,000 years with stalagmite rings constructed by Neanderthal men
- Cabrespine cave, near Carcassonne (city)
- Chauvet Cave, and its replica (for protection) Pont-d'Arc cave
- Choranche Cave
- Les Combarelles Cave
- Cosquer Cave, only sub-marine access), (its replica is in construction).
- Grotte des Demoiselles, near Nîmes
- Grotte des Fées Cave
- Font-de-Gaume Cave, near Les Eyzies-de-Tayac-Sireuil
- Gabillou Cave,
- Gargas Caves
- Gournier Cave
- Gouy Cave
- Grand Roc Cave, near Les Eyzies-de-Tayac-Sireuil
- Lascaux Cave
- Lazaret Cave, near Nice (city)
- Lombrives caves, this cave network is one of the most extensive in Europe and has seven distinct levels
- La Mansonnière Cave, one of the longest chalk caves
- Pech Merle Cave
- Niaux Cave
- Aven d'Orgnac
- Padirac Cave
- Savonnières Caves
- St-Médard-de-Presque Cave
- Rouffignac Cave
- La Salamandre Cave, near Alès (city)
- La Verna Cave, part of the Gouffre de la Pierre Saint-Martin
- Villars Cave

== Vertical Caves ==
- Gouffre Berger, the first cave explored to more than 1,000m depth
- Réseau du Clot d'Aspres the second 1,000m in Vercors
- Aven des Corneilles
- Gouffre Mirolda, in competition as the world's deepest cave
- Gouffre de la Pierre Saint-Martin
- Jean Bernard cave system, in competition as world's deepest cave
- Réseau Félix Trombe

== See also ==
- List of caves
- Speleology
