= Gournier Cave =

Cave in the Vercors, France

Gournier cave
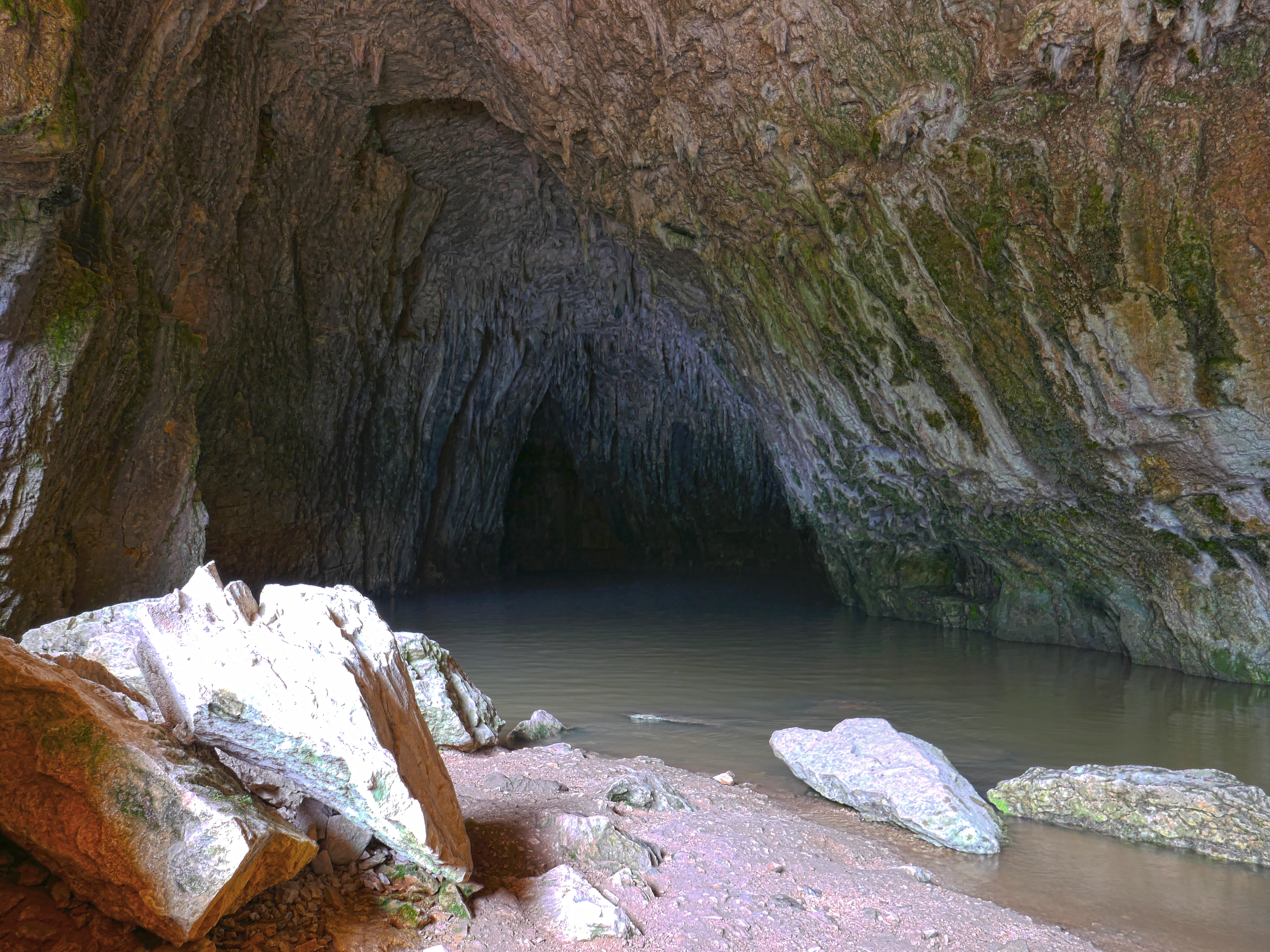
- Entrance lake to the Gournier cave.

- Location within France Location within Auvergne-Rhône-Alpes
- Location: Choranche, France
- Coordinates: 45°04′36.6″N 5°23′44.8″E
- Depth: + 680 metres (2,230 ft)
- Length: 18,000 metres (59,000 ft)
- Elevation: 572 metres (1,877 ft)
- Geology: Limestone

The Gournier Cave is located near Choranche in the Vercors Massif in southeastern France. The entrance is at an altitude of 572 m (1,877 ft) at the base of a cliff on the Presles plateau. It is one of the exsurgences (points at which an underground stream reaches the surface if the stream has no known surface headwaters) of the Coulmes massif, and the cave is considered by many speleologists to be the most beautiful underground river in the Alps.

== Exploration ==
In 1899 Decombaz visited the entrance lake by boat. In 1947, a climb over the lake by Jean Deudon gave access to a fossil gallery, which was explored by a team including André Bourgin for nearly 2,000 metres (6,600 ft), when two access points were discovered to the underlying river. The same team was stopped by a 12-metre (39 ft) waterfall in 1949. The latter was climbed in 1952 by Pierre Chevalier, and the river was followed to a large chamber. In the 1960s, the Spéléo Club de la Seine found the way on but was eventually stopped by a sump at a height of +270 metres (890 ft). (Note: In caving, the negative or positive measurements of height levels are defined in relation to at a reference point which is the known entrance to the network, the highest in altitude.)

March 1973, the Club Spéléo de Lyon passed the obstacle, but was stopped by a second sump. In 1974, this was passed by diving, and in November 1975, 5.3 kilometres (17,000 ft) from the entrance, the height of 460 metres (1,510 ft) above the entrance was reached at the foot of a 5 metres (16 ft) waterfall. In November 1976, while trying to pass the obstacle, three speleologists from the Rhone region, Michel Schmidt, Roland Chenevier, and Daniel Trouilleux, were swept away by a flood.

The Spéléo Club de Dijon resumed the explorations in May 1981, and above the 5 metres (16 ft) waterfall, a further 2,200 metres (7,200 ft) of galleries were discovered, reaching a height of +605 metres (1,985 ft). In 1982 the end was reached at + 680 metres (2,230 ft).

In August 1996, a cave diver, Frédéric Poggia, dived the sump l'affluent des Parisiens, discovering 1,200 metres (3,900 ft) of passages. He stopped at a fifth sump.

Speleologists have been digging sinkholes above the end of the cave for several years, hoping to reach the underlying passages.

== Description ==
Within the entrance porch is a 40 m (130 ft) long lake, above which is the entrance to a 2 km (1.2 mi) long fossil gallery, 10 m × 20 m (33 ft × 66 ft) wide, which has beautiful stalagmite floors in places. In the floor of this passage are four entrances to the underground river. The fine river passage can be followed up waterfalls and through pools to the large Salle Chevalier. After a complex section the river rejoins the cave. The Jerome siphon can now be passed by swimming. (Note: The level of the siphon threshold has been lowered since the discovery.)

A second sump can be avoided, and then the gallery broadens out, with a section of 20 m × 20 m (66 ft × 66 ft). The continuing passage, called the Aquagalerie, continues narrow and high, sometimes with deep water. Upstream of a 5 m (16 ft) waterfall the river passage continues. After the Salle des Burgondes, the gallery becomes broader, and then the passages become high and narrow, often requiring traversing, to close down at +680 m (2,230 ft).

== Karst Development ==
The cave has developed at the Urgonian-Hauterivian contact. The river has dug down into the Hauterivian, and the entrance fossil gallery lies within the Urgonian. The network developed along a northeast-southwest fault.

The fossil gallery was probably formed in the Pliocene in a subtropical climate, 3–4 million years ago. The active system was formed during the glacial episodes of Riss II and Würm.

== Capture ==
In 1997, a catchment to supply the village of Presles was considered, but another solution was found.

== Image gallery ==
Aspects of the Gournier Cave

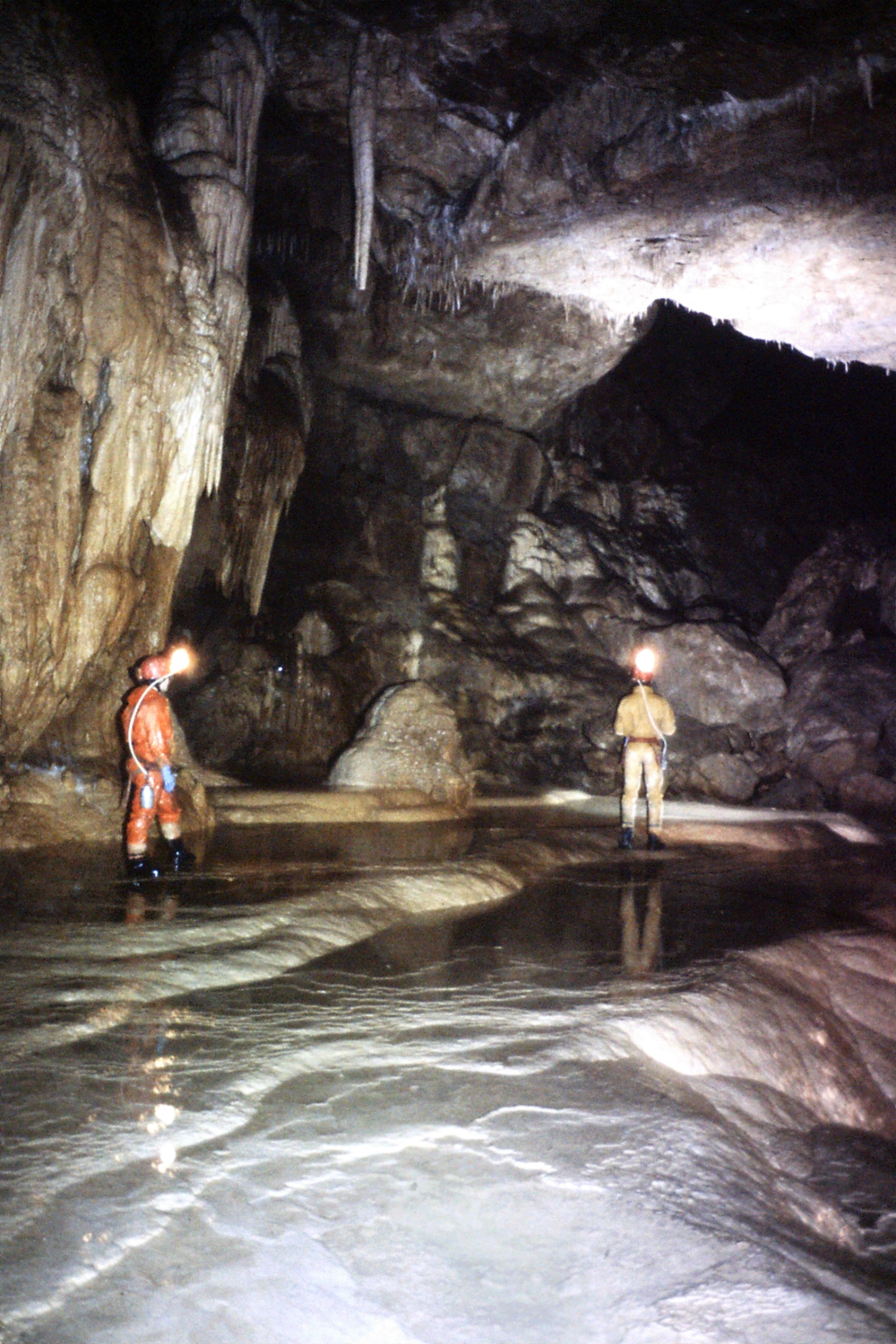
Rimstone at the beginning of the fossil gallery.

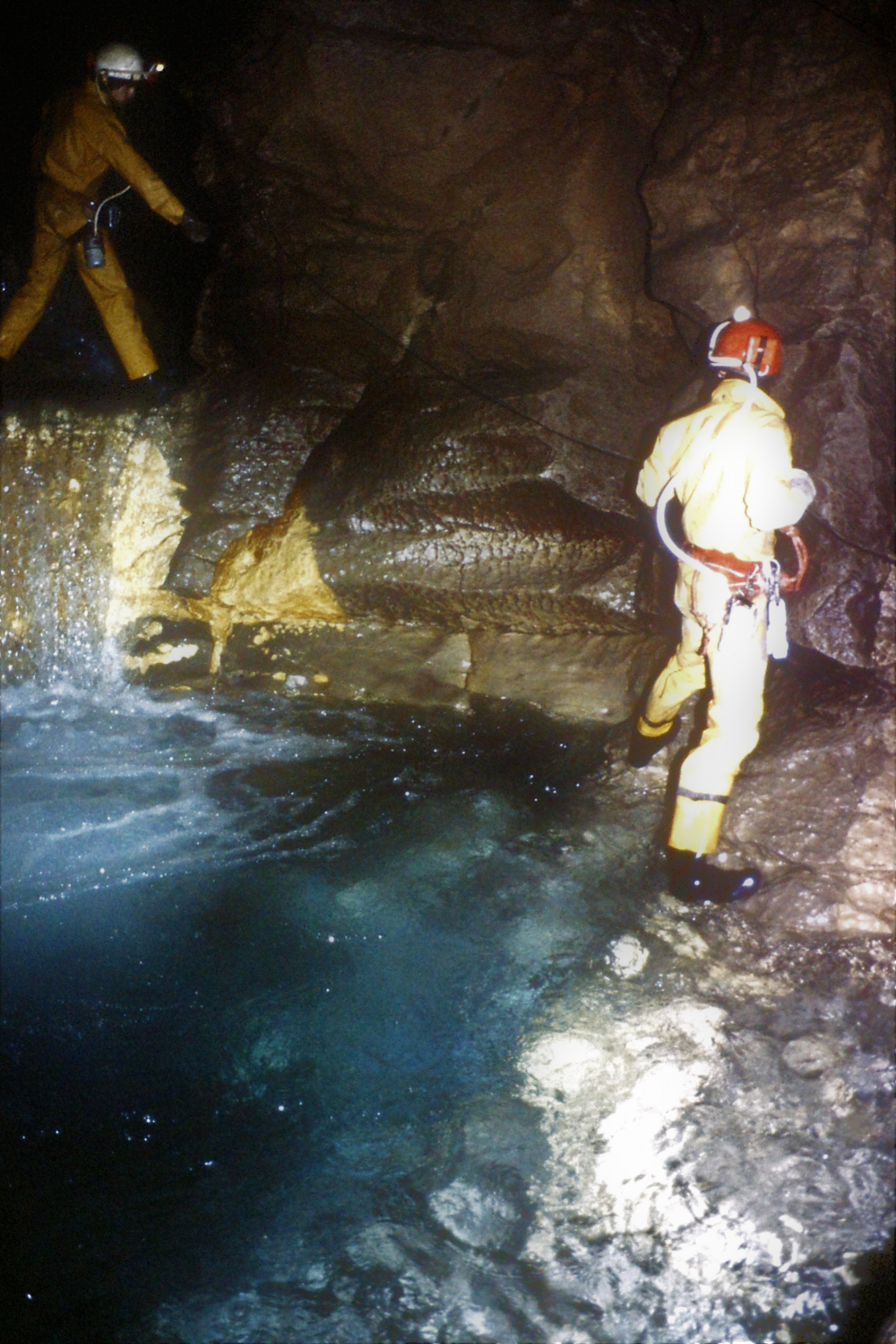
Start of the river.

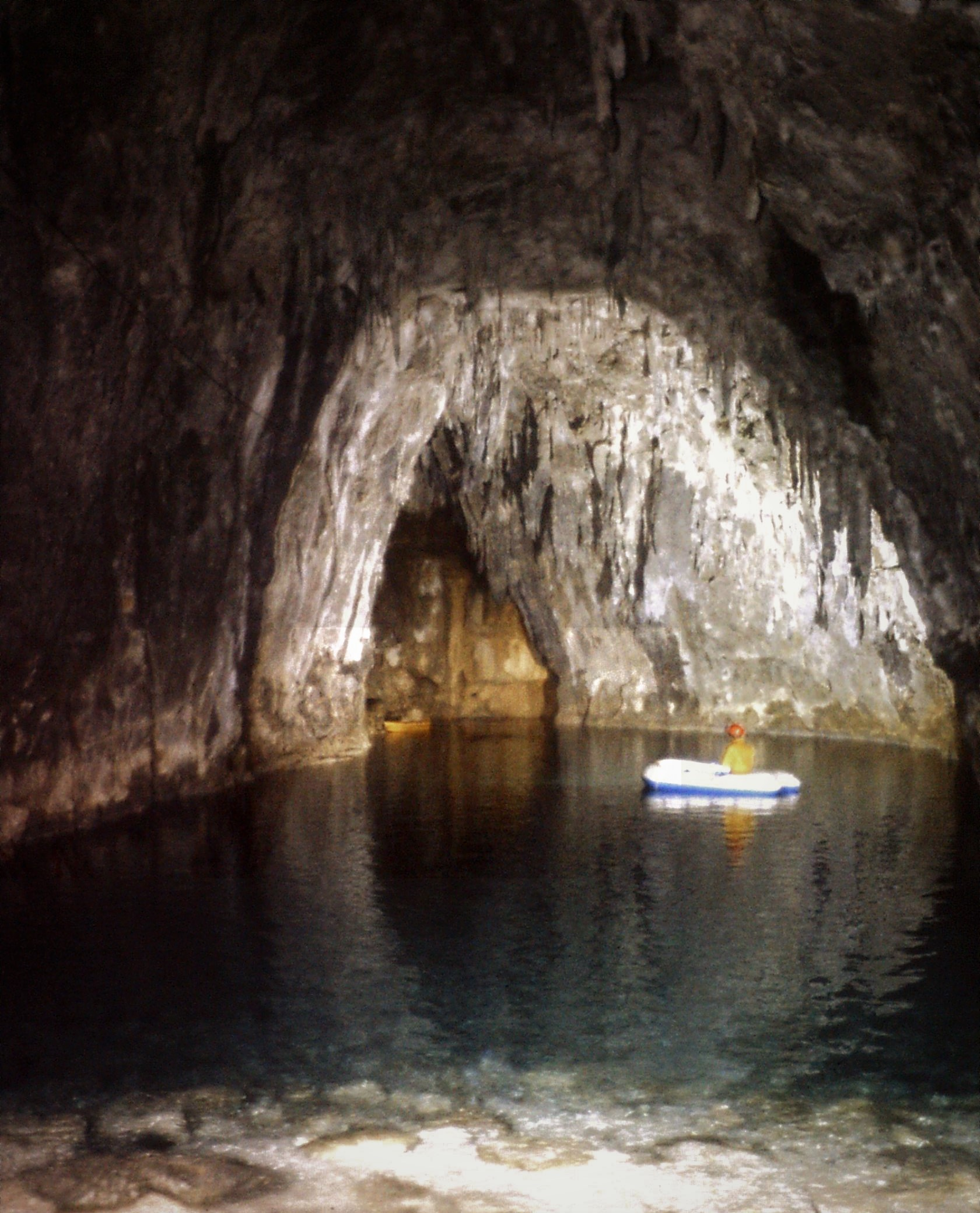
The entrance lake to the Gournier cave.

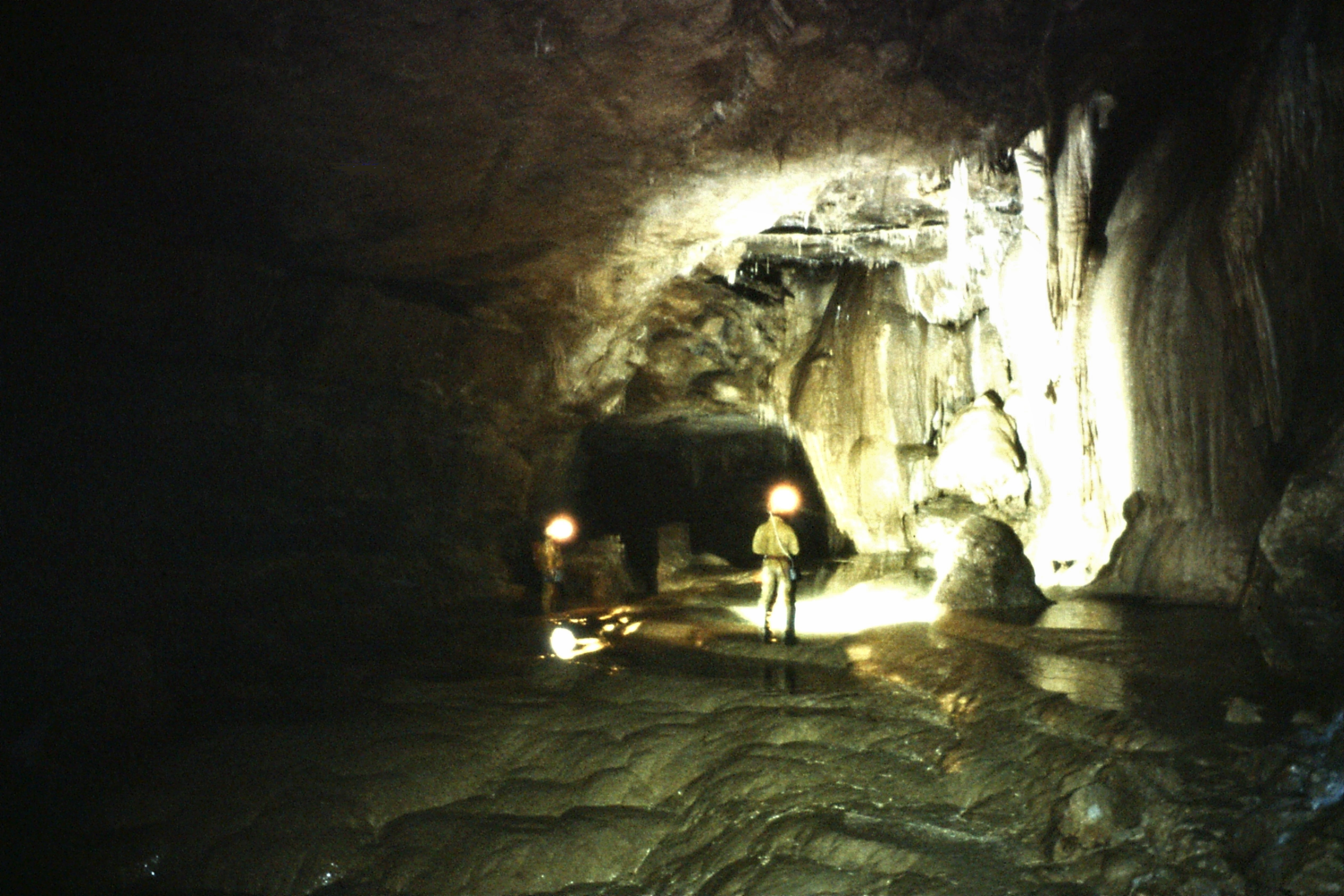
One of the admirable sections of the Gournier fossil gallery.

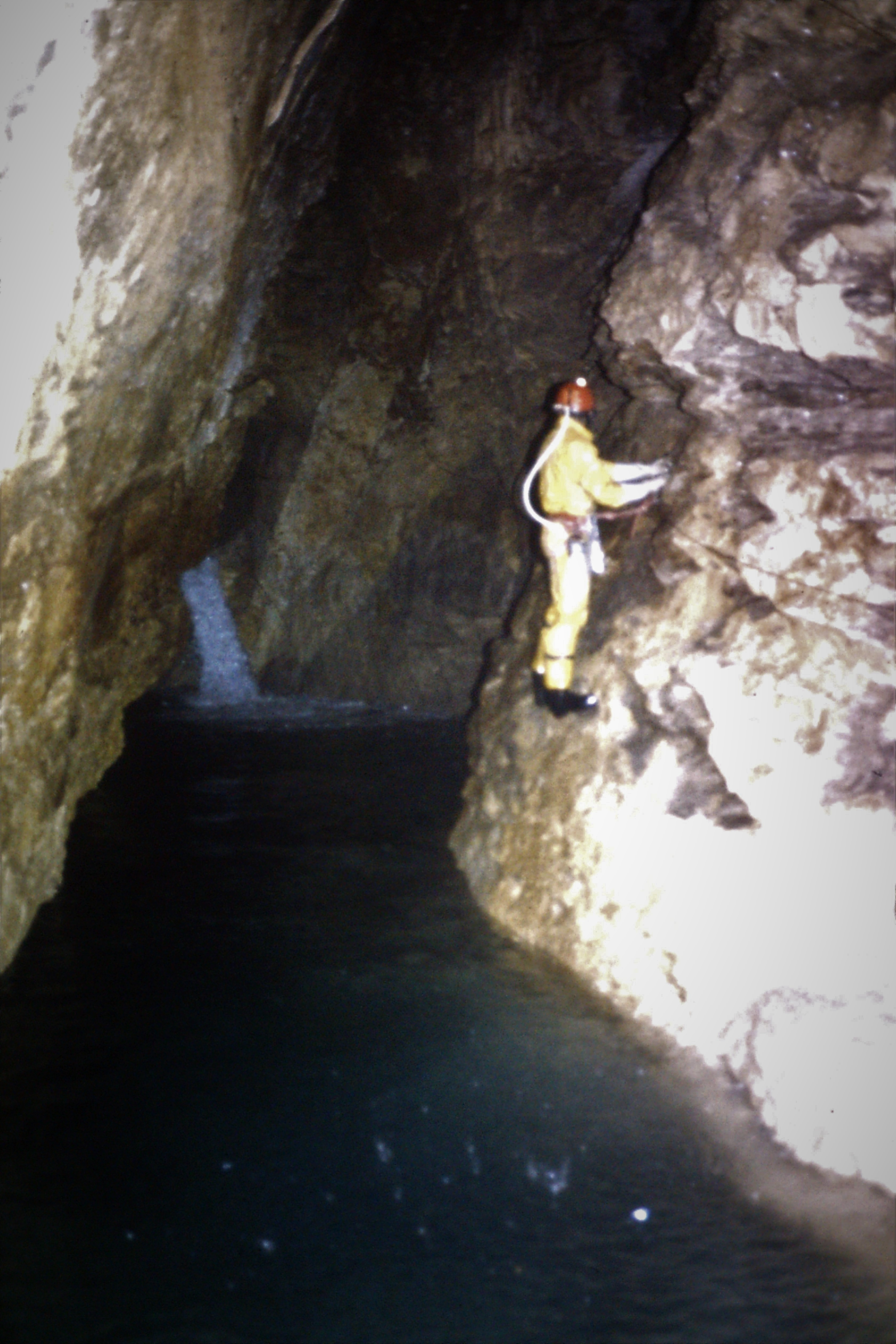
The river, made up of bodies of water and waterfalls.

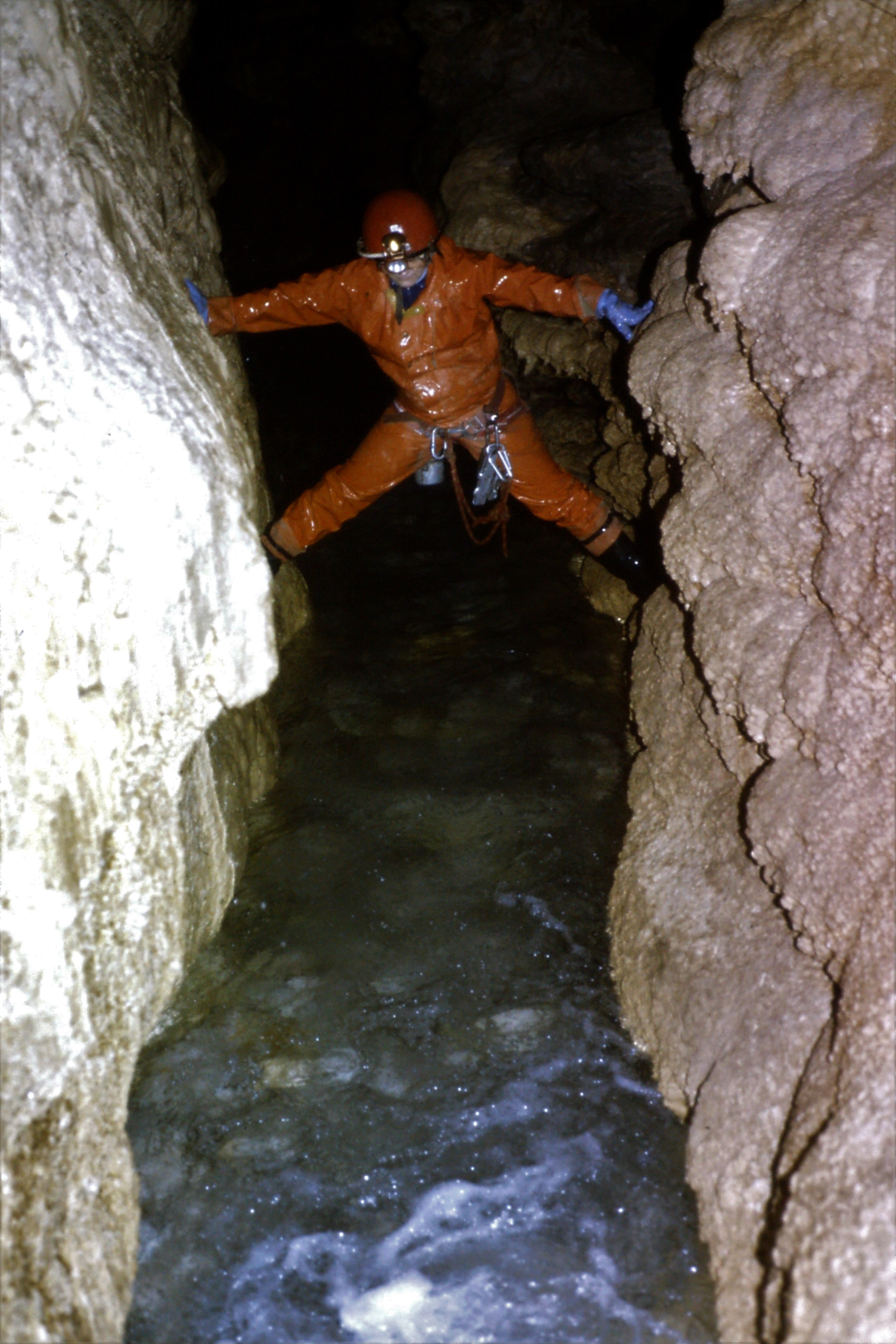
Progress over the river.

== See also ==
- Gouffre Mirolda
- List of caves in France
