= Réseau Félix Trombe =

- Location within France
- Location: Arbas, France
- Coordinates: 42°58′00″N 0°51′30″E
- Depth: 1,001 m (3,284 ft)
- Length: 126.343 km (78.51 mi)
- Elevation: 1,476 m (4,843 ft)
- Discovery: 1908
- Geology: limestone
- Entrances: 61

The réseau Félix-Trombe or Coume Ouarnède is an underground karst network formed by a succession of wells and galleries dug into the limestone.

It is a mythical network for speleologists from all over the world. It takes its name from a famous French speleologist: Félix Trombe.

== Geography ==
The réseau Félix-Trombe is located on the Arbas massif in the Pyrénées, south of the département in the région Occitanie.

== The network ==
The Félix-Trombe network is the longest underground network in France with 126.3 km (78.48 mi) kilometres of galleries and 61 entrances. With the Henne Morte (19 km (11.81 mi)), it makes the Réseau Félix Trombe-Henne Morte. It is a complex cavity due to its significant overall difference in altitude (1,001 m (3,284 ft)) and its numerous entrances.

On 15 and 16 September 2001 in 22 hours, about twenty cavers travelled the entire network from the former highest point (the Gouffre de la Coquille) to the lowest point of the network (the Goueil di Her).

The main cavities that make up this network are: :

- Le gouffre de l'Amazonie
- Le gouffre Barnache
- Le gouffre Bernard
- Le gouffre Bernard Gabaig
- Le gouffre Blagnac
- Le gouffre Cécile
- Le gouffre de la Coquille
- La grotte des Commingeois
- La grotte de Coume Nère
- Le gouffre des Deux Jean-Paul
- Les gouffres Duplessis
- Le puits des Fuxéens
- Le gouffre de la Fraternité, the highest entrance (1476 m).
- La grotte du Goueil di Her
- Le gouffre des Hérétiques
- Le puits de l'If
- Le gouffre Jean-Denis
- Le gouffre de la Laspapoulosmose
- Le gouffre Martine
- Le gouffre Michelle
- Le gouffre Odon
- Le gouffre du Pont de Gerbaut
- La grotte des Provençaux
- Le gouffre des Pyrénois
- Le gouffre du Québec
- Le gouffre du Sahel
- Le gouffre du Sarrat dech Méné
- Le gouffre de l'Apocalypse

Also included are: :

- La Henne Morte
- Le gouffre Pierre
- Le gouffre Raymonde
- La grotte de Pène Blanque
- Le trou du Vent,
- Le gouffre de la Fraternité
- Le trou Mile

== See also ==
- List of caves in France
- List of caves
- List of longest caves
- Speleology
