= Gouffre Mirolda =

Cave in Haute-Savoie, France

- Location within France Location within Auvergne-Rhône-Alpes
- Location: Samoëns, France
- Coordinates: 46°05′19.9″N 6°46′14″E
- Depth: 1,661 metres (5,449 ft)
- Length: 22,032 metres (72,283 ft)
- Elevation: 1,880 metres (6,170 ft)
- Discovery: 1971
- Entrances: 7

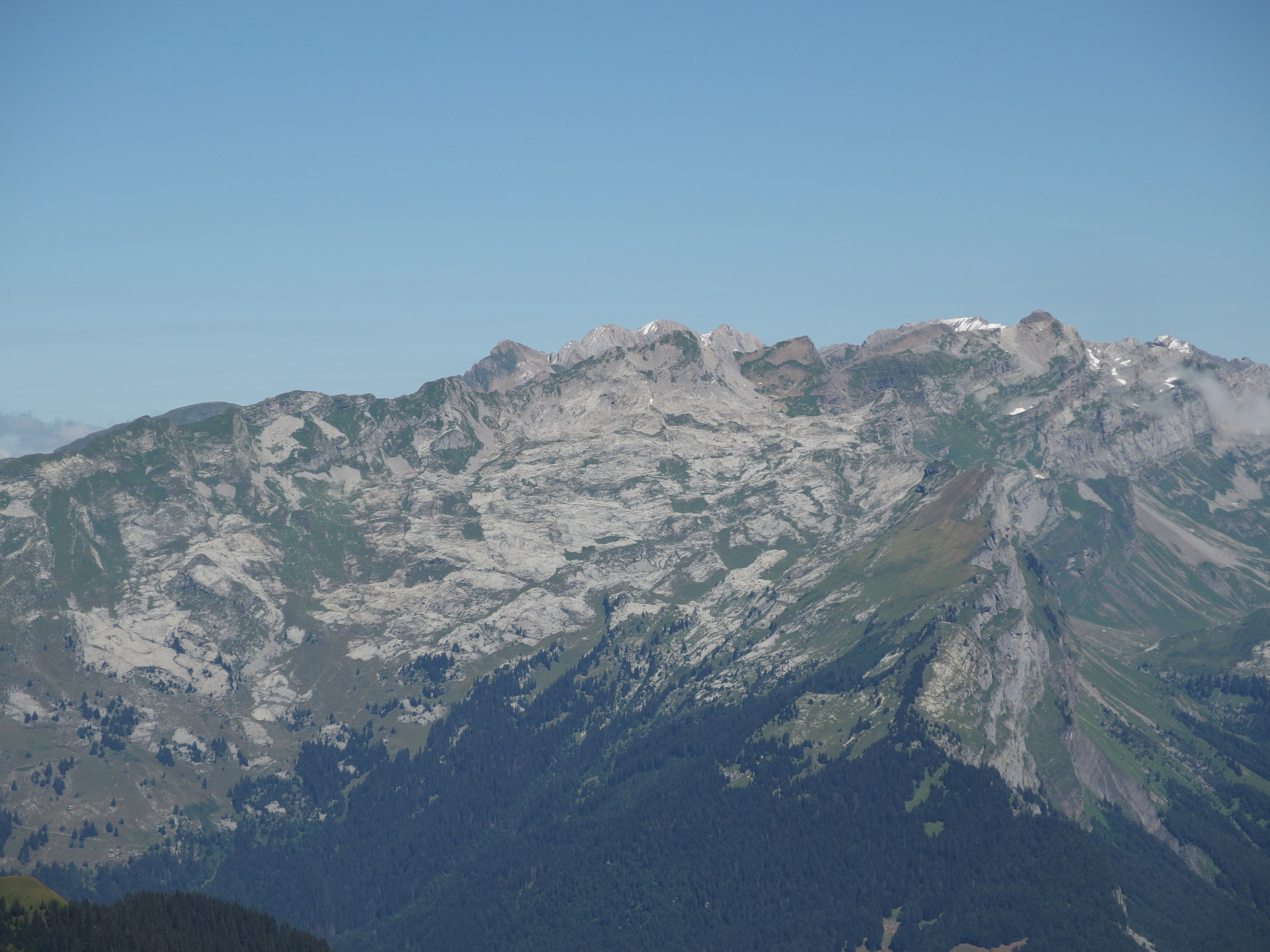
La montagne du Criou

Gouffre Mirolda is a karstic cave located in the Haut-Giffre mountain range, in the commune of Samoëns, Haute-Savoie, France. It is connected to the Lucien Bouclier cave system, and has a depth of −1,661 m (−5,449 ft). It is the sixth deepest cave in the world.

== Exploration ==
The cave was discovered in 1971 by Marc Degrinis, a shepherd. In 1972, the AVEN group in Lyon widened the entrance, and explored to a depth of −127 m (−417 ft) to an impenetrable meander. In 1976, an upper entrance, the VF3, at 2,324 m (7,625 ft), was discovered by the Villefranche Caving Club (EESV) and explored as far as the base of the first 30 m (98 ft) shaft on a narrow slope. The Gouffre Mirolda (CD11) was reinvestigated in 1980 by SC Lyon. With the help of the GS Cavernicole and the SC du Chablais, a depth of −850 m (−2,790 ft) was reached. In 1981, the river was explored down to −1,100 m (−3,600 ft). Reinforced by the SS Genève and the Thonon Tauping Club, fossil galleries and upstream tunnels enabled the network to reach a height difference of 1,143 m (3,750 ft) in 1988. The unblocking of the Gouffre VF3 gave access to the system named after Lucien Bouclier, a speleologist who died in 1987 on the massif. The junction was made by the Ursus group between the Gouffre Mirolda and the Réseau Lucien Bouclier in 1992 for a depth of −1,436 m (−4,711 ft), and also with the Gouffre de la Rondelle Jaune (2,220 m (7,280 ft)). At the bottom of CD11 the depth was increased in 1993 to −1,520 m (−4,990 ft), and −1,610 m (−5,280 ft) in 1998. The Gouffre du Joker (2,332 m (7,651 ft)) was connected to the network in 1999, increasing its depth to −1,616 m (−5,302 ft). The terminal sump was dived in 2003, increasing the depth to its current −1,733 m (−5,686 ft), making it the deepest natural cave in the world from January 2003 until July 2004, when it was passed by the cave Krubera-Voronja in Georgia. In September 2022 and 2023 the Collectif Mirolda, took over the topography, updated the in-situ equipment and examined the possibilities of further discovery. The cave is the deepest in France. A new survey reduces the depth to -1661 m. Its name is derived from the forenames of the Rhodanien cavers Michel Schmidt, Roland Chenevier, and Daniel Trouilleux, who were lost in a flood in Gournier Cave in November 1976.

== Description ==
The highest entrance of the system is at 2,330 m (7,640 ft). The lowest point of the cave is at −1,661 m (−5,449 ft) at the grand siphon in the gallery. The bottom of the gallery (after the second siphon) has only been explored once, with potential for further exploration. Behind the second siphon (approximately −1,620 m (−5,310 ft)) the gallery continues for 22 m (72 ft) horizontally and down 8 m (26 ft), leading to an ancient drainage system. Downstream, the gallery descends over a length of 251 m (823 ft) and a vertical drop of 110 m (360 ft) before coming up against the first siphon at −1,733 m (−5,686 ft). Past the siphon the gallery divides in two, the left leading up towards the roof and the right leading 50 m (160 ft) to a fossil gallery.

== Karst Development ==
The Gouffre Mirolda is developed in Urgonian Limestone at its contact of the Hauterivian marl following the dip first (E-W), and then (S-W) towards the Giffre valley. The water flows into the alluvial aquifer, and no resurgence is known. As at the Gouffre Jean-Bernard, the upstream section of the Réseau Lucien Bouclier appears to be the oldest part of the system, with the base of the CD 11 developed following the incision of the Giffre valley.

== See also ==
- Gouffre Jean-Bernard
- List of deepest caves
- List of caves in France
- List of caves
