= Haroun Tazieff =

Franco-Belgian volcanologist

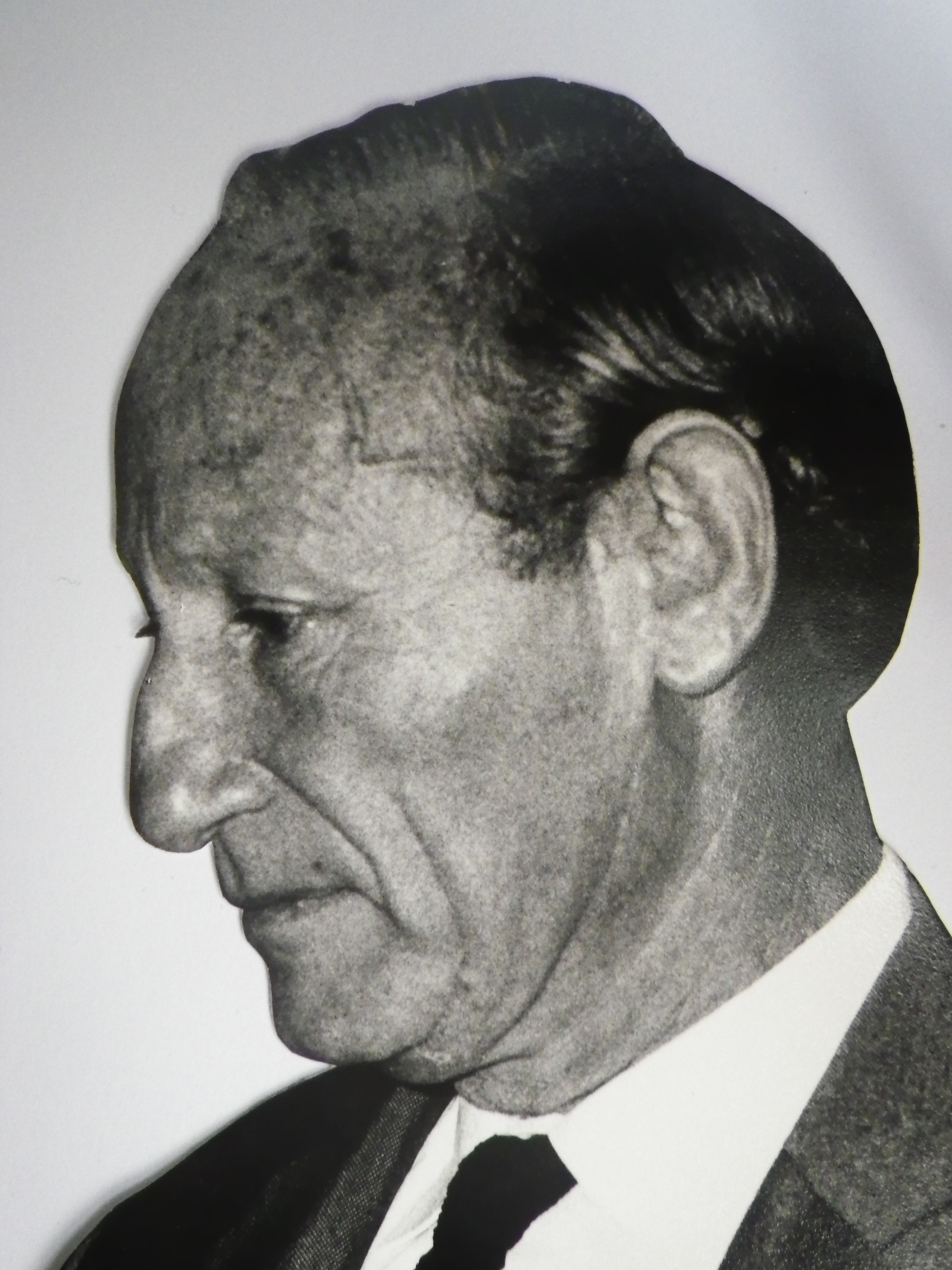
- Haroun Tazieff in Saint-Denis, Réunion, October 1972
- Born: 11 May 1914; Warsaw, Kingdom of Poland, Russian Empire
- Died: 2 February 1998 (aged 83); Paris, France
- Education: University of Liège
- Occupations: Geologist; Volcanologist

Haroun Tazieff (11 May 1914 – 2 February 1998) was a Franco-Belgian volcanologist and geologist. He was a famous cinematographer of volcanic eruptions and lava flows, and the author of several books on volcanoes. He was also a government adviser and French cabinet minister. He also served in the Belgian resistance during World War II.

== Early life ==
Tazieff's parents met and married in 1906 while they were both students in Brussels. They later returned to Warsaw, where their first son, Salvator, died at two months and where Haroun was born. His father, Sabir, was a Muslim medical doctor of Tatar descent, and his mother, Zenita Iliyasovna Klupta, was a Polish Jewish chemist and doctor of natural science and holder of a bachelor's degree in political science. His father was conscripted into the Russian Army and died during the First World War, a fact that did not reach the family until 1919. In 1917 Haroun emigrated to Brussels with his widowed mother.

Tazieff received a degree in agronomy in Gembloux in 1938, and another degree in geology at the University of Liège in 1944.

== Career ==
Tazieff participated in the first detailed exploration of the "Saint-Martin" La Verna cave system in the French Pyrenees. In 1952, while he was filming Marcel Loubens' ascent of the Pierre-Saint-Martin rock face, the cable of the hoist broke and Loubens fell over 80 meters. Loubens died 36 hours later but his body could only be recovered from the cave in 1954.

He became famous in France after publishing a book titled, "Le Gouffre de la Pierre Saint-Martin" in 1952.

He directed the documentary movie Le volcan interdit (1966) about the Nyiragongo Mountain in the Democratic Republic of Congo, which he was the first to climb in 1948.

The National Geographic film, The Violent Earth, was based on Tazieff's expeditions to the volcanoes Mount Etna on Sicily in 1971 and Mount Nyiragongo in 1972. In these expeditions he attempted, unsuccessfully, to descend into the active lava lake in order to collect samples — something he had managed to achieve on a previous expedition in 1959.

He was a secretary of state in France in the 1980s, in charge of protection against major threats.

In 2008 the mineral species Tazieffite was named in his honour.

Tazieff died in 1998 and was buried in the Passy Cemetery in Paris.

== Publications ==
His publications, mostly in French, were translated into English, and included texts about forecasting volcanic and earthquake events. They include:

- Cratères en feu, Édition Arthaud, 1951 (Gallimard jeunesse 1973 und in 4. editions Arthaud 1978)
- Tore der Hölle. Vulkankunde, Rüschlikon-Zürich, Müller, 1950
- L'Eau et le Feu, Édition Arthaud, 1954. German edition: Im Banne der Vulkane. Abenteuer eines Geologen im ostafrikanischen Graben, Brockhaus 1955
- Les rendez-vous du diable, Édition Hachette, 1959, 1961
- Geburt eines Vulkans – afrikanisches Abenteuer, Lux 1962
- Der Ätna und seine Nachbarn – Stromboli, Vulcano, Lipari, Lux 1960
- Histoires de volcans, Le Livre de Poche, 1978.
- with Clément Borgal and Norbert Casteret 15 aventures sous terre, Éditions Gautier-Languereau, 1970.
- L'Etna et les volcanologues, Édition Arthaud, 1973
- Vingt-cinq ans sur les volcans du globe, 2 volumes, Éditions Nathan, 1974–1975.
- L'odeur du soufre: expédition en Afar, Éditions Stock, 1975, ISBN 978-2-253-01535-2
- Cordillères, séismes et volcans, Laffont, 1975
- Niragongo, ou le volcan interdit, Flammarion, 1975. Deutsche Ausgabe Niragongo, Rüschlikon-Zürich, Müller 1980
- Le gouffre de la Pierre Saint-Martin, Arthaud, 1952, Neuauflage 1976, Online bei Association de recherches spéléologiques internationales de la Pierre Saint-Martin ISBN 2-7003-0175-7
- Jouer avec le feu, Seuil 1976
- La Soufrière et autres volcans: la volcanologie en danger. Éditions Flammarion 1979
- Ouvrez donc les yeux : conversations sur quelques points brûlants d'actualité (Conversations with Claude Mossé), Laffont 1980.
- with Claude Villers Ça sent le soufre, Éditions Nathan 1981.
- Les volcans et la dérive des continents, Presses universitaires de France, 1973, 1984, 1991, deutsche Ausgabe Vulkanismus und Kontinentwanderung, DVA 1974
- Sur l´Etna, Flammarion 1984, deutsche Ausgabe Der Ätna- der Berg, seine Gefahren, seine Zukunft, Busse-Seewald 1988
- Quand la terre tremble, 3. edition, Fayard 1986
- La prévision des séismes, Hachette, Collection questions de science, 1987
- Les volcans, Hachette littérature 1987
- with Max Derruau Le volcanisme et sa prévention, Masson 1990
- with Bernard Amy, Florence Trystram: Sur l'Etna, 3. edition, Flammarion, 1991
- Les défis et la chance: ma vie, Éditions Stock - L. Pernoud, 2 volumes, 1991–1992 (Autobiography, Vol. 1: De Pétrograd au Niragongo, Vol. 2: Le Vagabond des Volcans)
- La terre va-t-elle cesser de tourner?: pollutions réelles, pollutions imaginaires, 2nd edition, Éditions Séghers, 1992.
- Erebus - Volcan Antarctique, Arthaud 1978 and Collection Babel, Terres d’aventures. Actes Sud. 1994
- Volcans, Éditions Bordas, 1996.
- South from the Red Sea, The Travel Book Club, Lutterworth Press, translated by Naomi Lewis.
