= Gouffre de la Pierre Saint-Martin =

One of the main caves in France

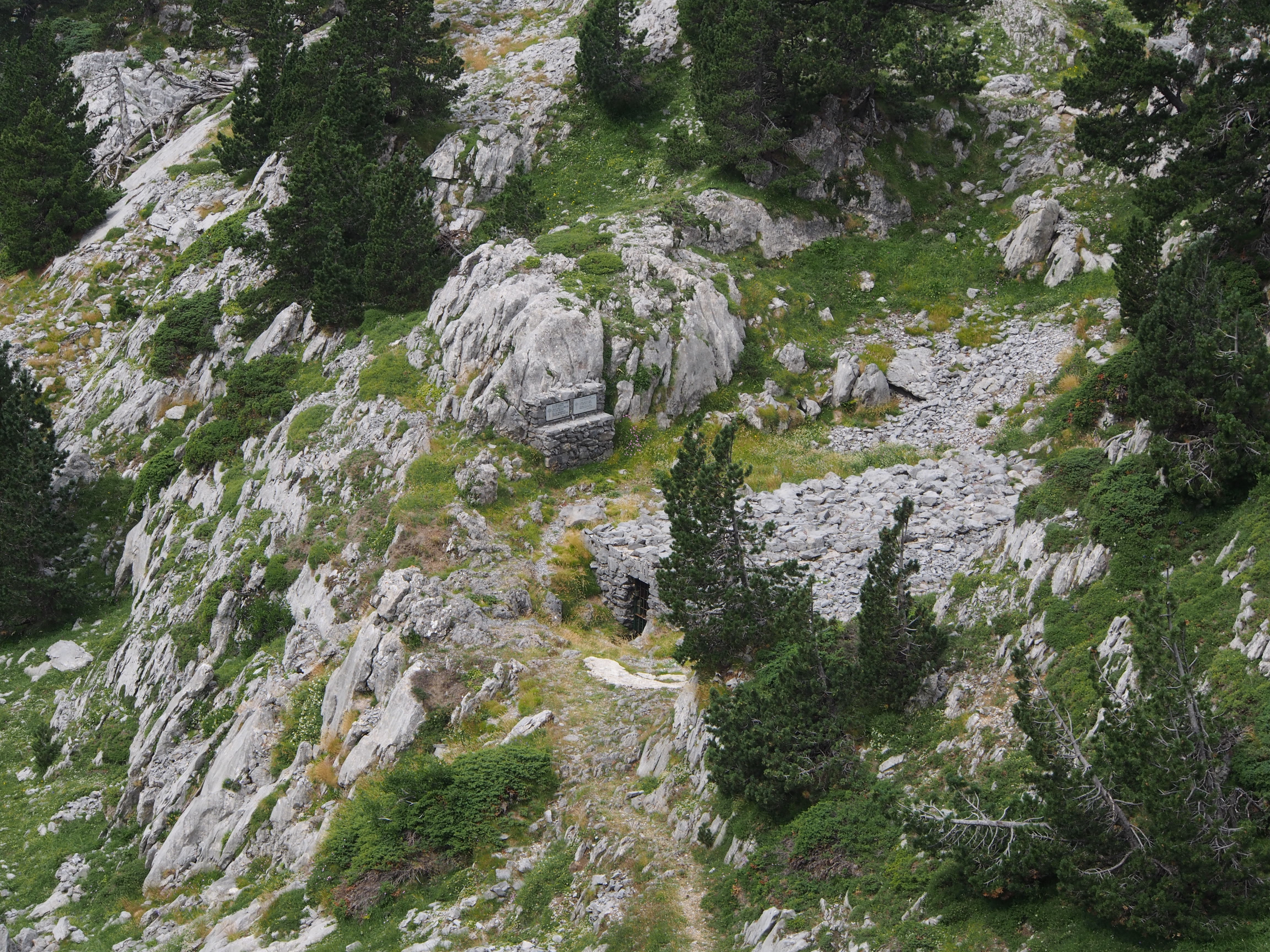
- Gouffre de La Pierre Saint-Martin below the road.

- Location within Spain
- Location: Isaba
- Coordinates: 42°58′05″N 0°46′09″W
- Depth: 1,410 metres (4,630 ft)
- Length: 88,111 metres (289,078 ft)
- Elevation: 1,717 m (5,633 ft)
- Discovery: 1950
- Geology: Limestone
- Entrances: 14

The Gouffre de la Pierre Saint-Martin, also called Gouffre Lépineux (Spanish: Pozo Lepineux), is the original entrance to a major cave system located in the massif of La Pierre Saint-Martin (massif de la Larra-Belagua to the Spaniards), in the immediate vicinity of the Franco-Spanish border and the French commune of Arette, in the Pyrénées-Atlantiques in the Nouvelle-Aquitaine region, under which lies part of the cave network.

== Karst context and topography ==
The Gouffre Lépineux, as well as the whole of the Réseau de La Pierre Saint-Martin to which it belongs, is within a 140 square kilometres (54 mi^{2}) karst area between 1,500 metres (4,900 ft) and 2,100 metres (6,900 ft) above sea level, straddling the border between France and Spain. This area of karst, drained by four major hydrological systems, has some of the deepest and most developed caves in the world. Oriented north -111°-115° (or 290°-295°), thirteen recognized rivers flow through it, resurging from six springs.

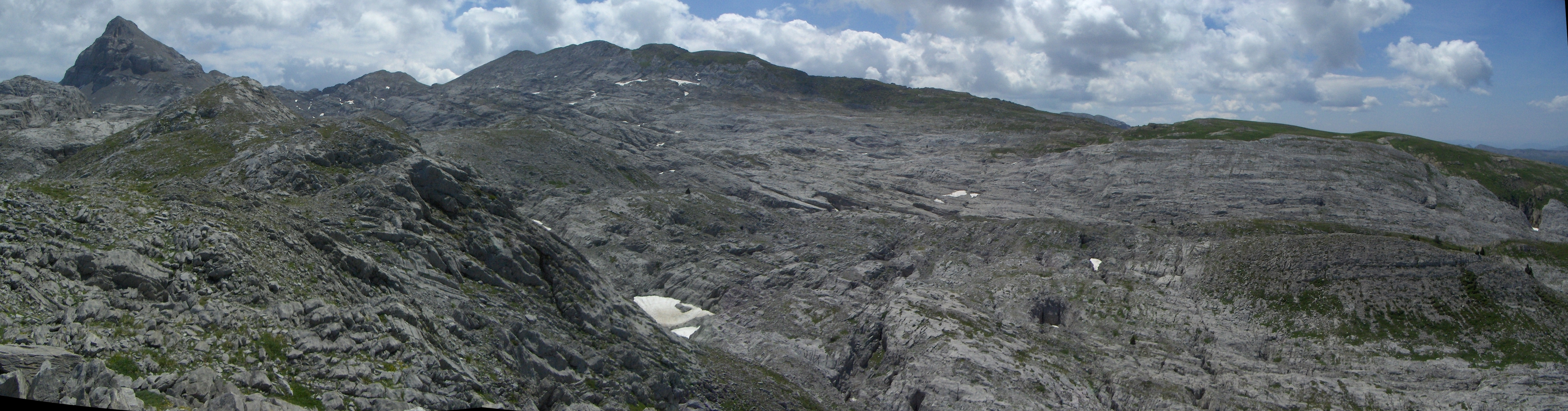
The karst de La Pierre Saint-Martin with the pic d'Anie ( 2,504 metres (8,215 ft)).

In 2020, the development of all cave passage, listed by ARSIP (Association for International Speleological Research at La Pierre Saint-Martin) was 465.750 kilometres (289.404 mi) long. More than 2,000 entrances connect these passages to the surface, of which 50 exceed 300 metres (980 ft) deep. The area of the chambers explored is 248,812 square metres (2,678,190 ft^{2}), and their volume is approximately 10,000,000 cubic metres (350,000,000 ft^{3}), including 3,600,000 cubic metres (130,000,000 ft^{3}) in the salle de la Verna and 2,000,000 cubic metres (71,000,000 ft^{3}) in the salle de l'Eclipse.

== History ==
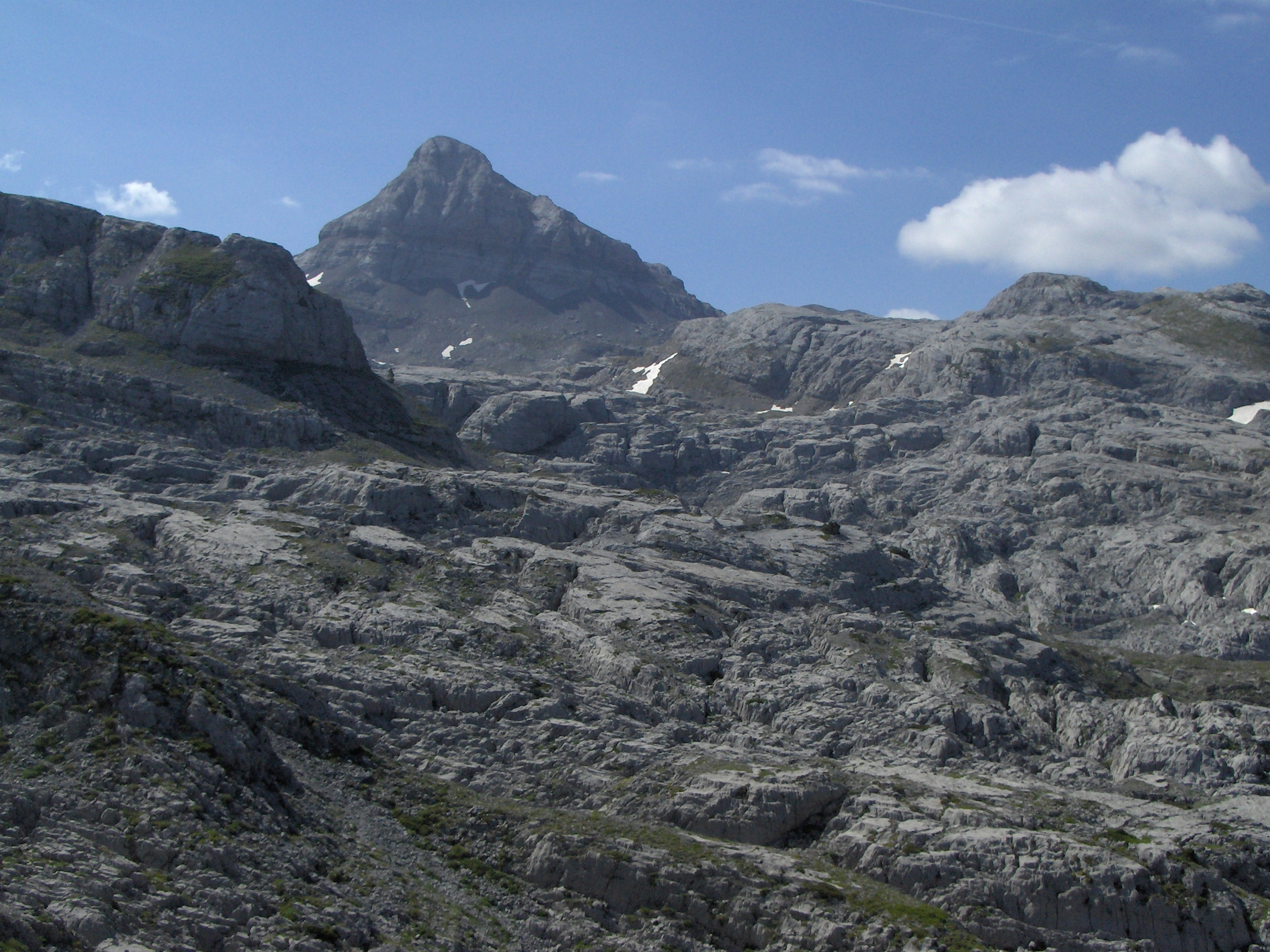
Les Arres d'Anie.

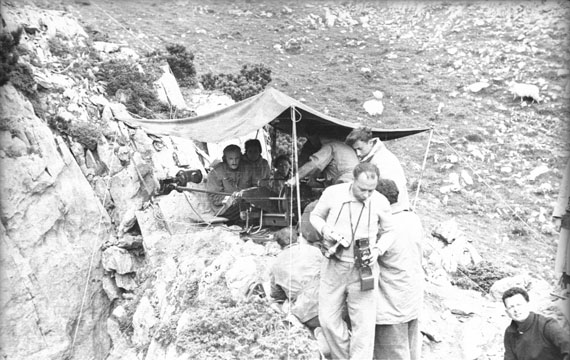
1952 expedition to the gouffre Lépineux.

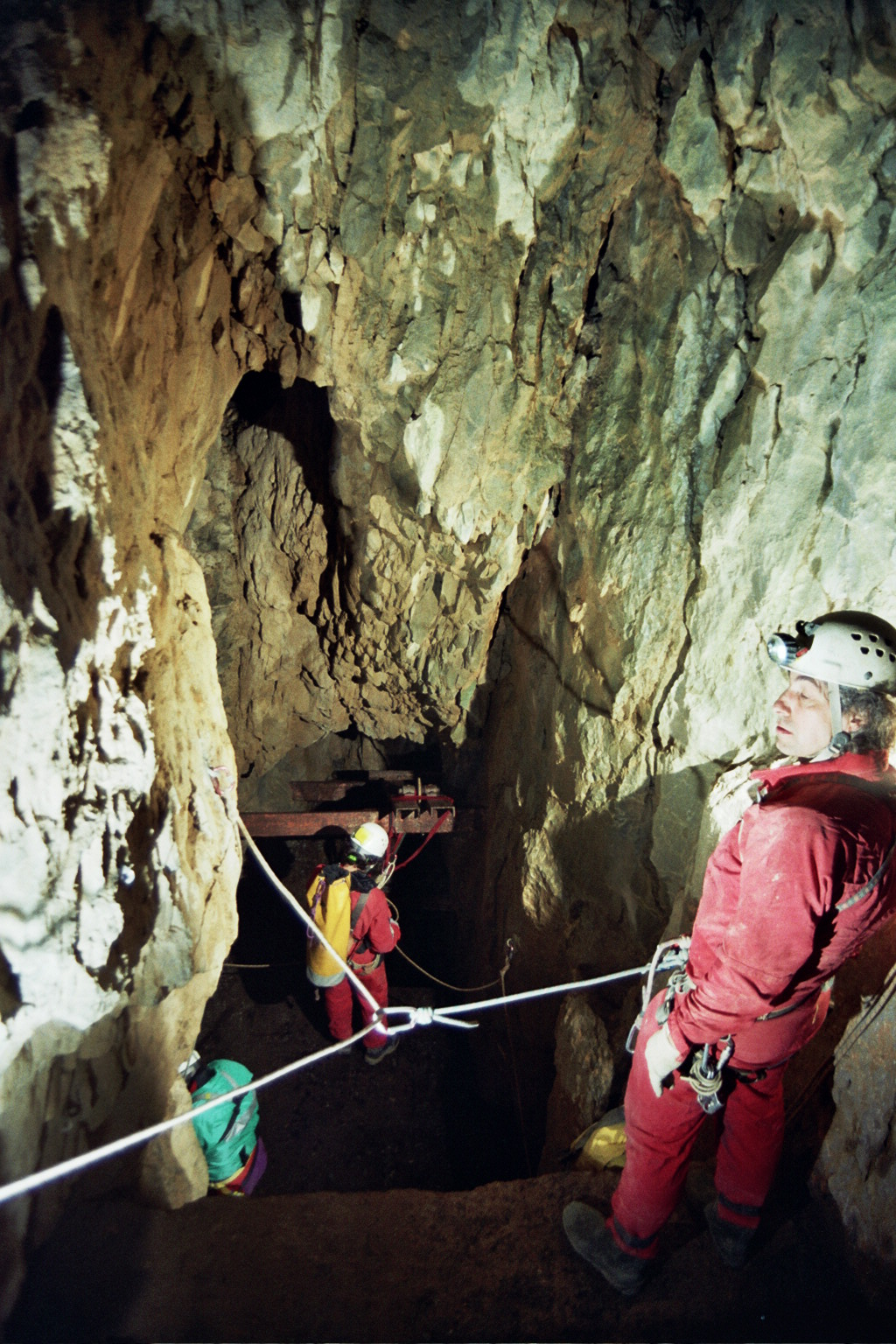
Entrance of gouffre de la Pierre Saint-Martin in 2010.

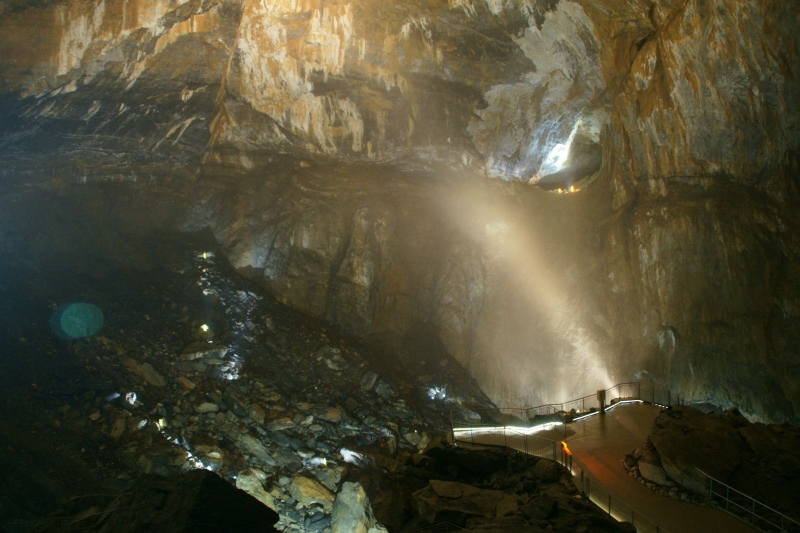
La salle de la Verna.

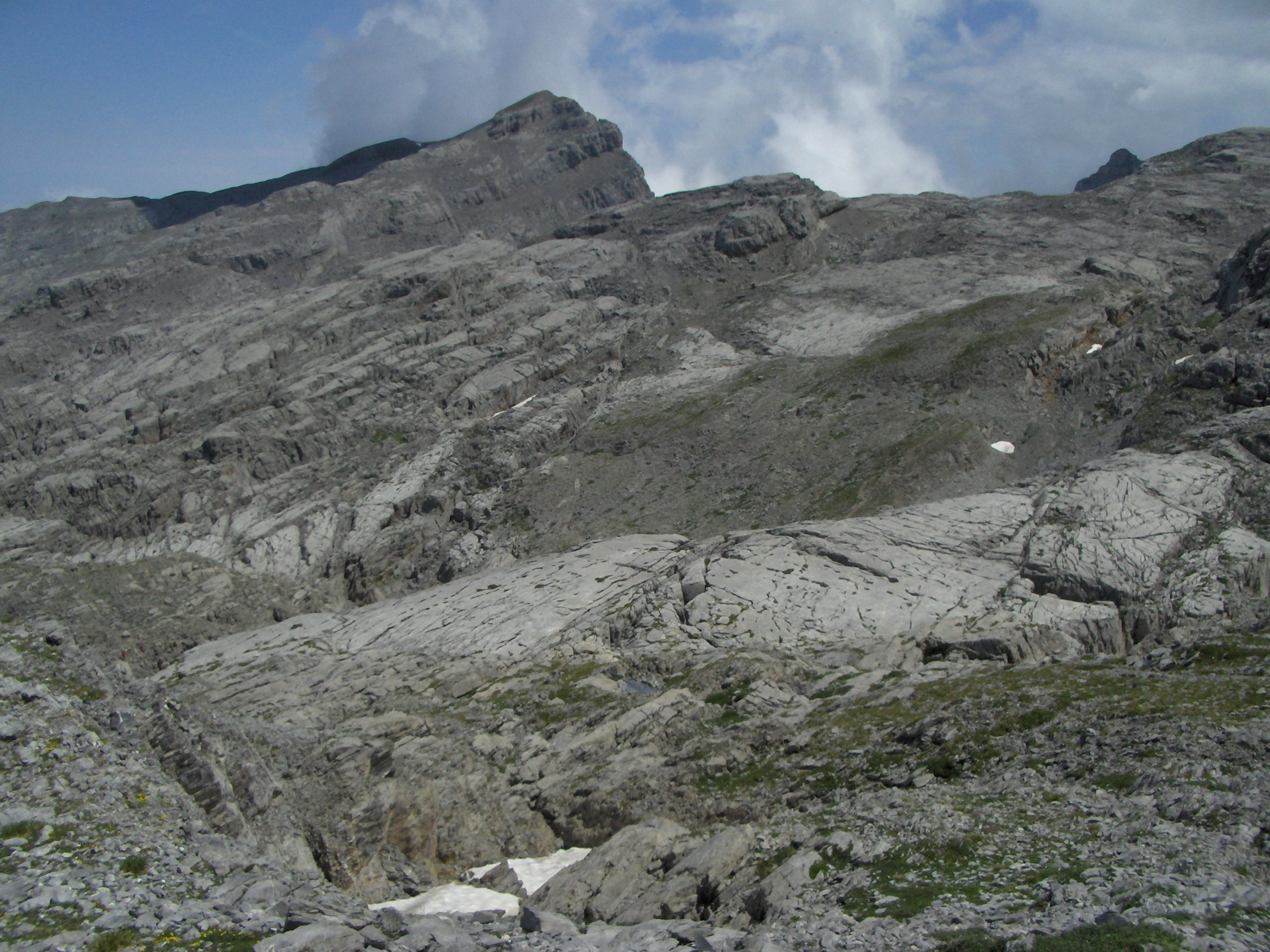
Near the gouffre des Partages.

Investigated by Eugène Fournier and Édouard-Alfred Martel at the end of the nineteenth century, the massif became famous with the discovery in 1950 by Georges Lépineux, of the shaft that proved to be the first entrance to the réseau de La Pierre Saint-Martin. In search of shafts in the area, he saw an Alpine chough, emerge from a hole which he found to be emitting a draught. He and some companions removed a blockage, to discover the entrance to the abyss.

In 1951, this shaft of 320 metres (1,050 ft), was the deepest in the world at the time (which earned it the title of "Everest of the deep", the first ascent of Everest taking place in 1953). It was descended by a team which included Jacques Labeyrie, Georges Lépineux, Marcel Loubens and Haroun Tazieff, during an expedition led by physicist Max Cosyns.

In 1952, a large-scale expedition, which also included Jacques Labeyrie and Haroun Tazieff, turned into a tragedy: a cable clamp failed on the winch being used, and Marcel Loubens fell 15 metres (49 ft) during his ascent. After remaining in a coma for several days, he died at the bottom of the shaft. The body was buried on the spot and was not brought to the surface until 2 years later. This drama at the bottom of the deepest cave in the world was reported by the world press and related in detail by Tazieff in one of his books. A plaque at the bottom of the chasm commemorates the tragedy. The epitaph of Marcel Loubens was engraved with a chisel where his coffin lay at the bottom of the abyss, by Jacques Labeyrie, a member of the team that tried everything to save Loubens.

The day before the tragedy Labeyrie and Loubens discovered a chamber, once probably an ancient lake, which has not been found since.

In 1953, a huge chamber, the salle de la Verna (255 by 245 by 194 metres (837 ft × 804 ft × 636 ft)) was discovered by speleologists from Lyon. In 1956, the EDF company drilled a tunnel to reach the chamber with the aim of capturing the water. The project was abandoned at the time, then resumed in 2006.

In 1961, using the EDF tunnel for access, a climb of 70 metres (230 ft) in the salle de la Verna led to the discovery of the Aranzadi gallery, the old course of the river, and a downstream extension. The lowest point of the system was reached in 1965, via the méandre Martine and le puits Parment, 1,006 metres (3,301 ft) below the entrance of the Lépineux shaft.

In 1966 the Association for International Speleological Research of La Pierre Saint-Martin (ARSIP) was created, with the aim of coordinating the various research projects on the massif. The D9 or Gouffre de la Tête Sauvage at an altitude of 1,878 metres (6,161 ft) on the Arres d'Anie was connected to the base of the Lépineux shaft and became the upper entrance to the network.

In 1975 the gouffre Moreau or M3, altitude 1,984 metres (6,509 ft), was connected to the system, making the depth 1,273 metres (4,177 ft), and fifteen days later the SC3 or gouffre du Beffroi, 2,037 metres (6,683 ft) was connected, increasing it to 1,321 metres (4,334 ft).

In 1982, the gouffre Pourtet (M31), 2,058 metres (6,752 ft), further increased the depth to 1,342 metres (4,403 ft).

In 2006, the project to capture the river in the salle de la Verna was completed. It had started in the 1950s, then abandoned because the underground river could not provide sufficient flow owing to surveying errors when constructing the galleries. Today, a 600-metre (2,000 ft) long gallery accesses the chamber.

The project was taken over by SHEM (Société Hydro Électrique du Midi), a former subsidiary of SNCF, now of the SUEZ Group. A water intake was built upstream of the salle de la Verna; the necessary pipes were laid in corbelling along the eastern wall of the chamber, then beneath the floor of the EDF access gallery to finally supply the plant located further down on the edge of the Gave de Sainte-Engrâce.

This underground hydroelectric dam of La Verna cave in Sainte-Engrâce (Pyrénées-Atlantiques) has a capacity of 4 megawatts. It was commissioned on April 2, 2008.

This project also made it possible to open the salle de la Verna to the public, thanks to a layout designed and managed by the Pyrénées-Atlantiques Departmental Committee of Speleology. Visits have been possible since July 2010, by prior booking.

On Tuesday, August 5, 2008, the M 413 or Gouffre des Partages (−1,122 metres (−3,681 ft) deep, 24 kilometres (79,000 ft) long) was joined to the system through a connection with the gouffre du Pourtet (M31). With this connection, the combined Réseau de la Pierre Saint-Martin - Gouffre des Partages exceeded 82 kilometres (51 mi) long and 1,410 metres (4,630 ft) deep (the second longest cave in France, and the third deepest).

In 2014 three new entrances were added to the system: the gouffre des Quinquas (C2-C104) and the Sima Grande de Llano Carreras (C226). In August 2021 the system was connected with Xendako Ziloa, and in January 2022 with Trou Huet, resulting in a network with over 87 kilometres (54 mi) of passages, and 14 natural entrances and one artificial.

== See also ==
- List of deepest caves
- List of caves in Spain
- La Verna cave
