= Choranche Cave =

Cave in Auvergne-Rhône-Alpes, France

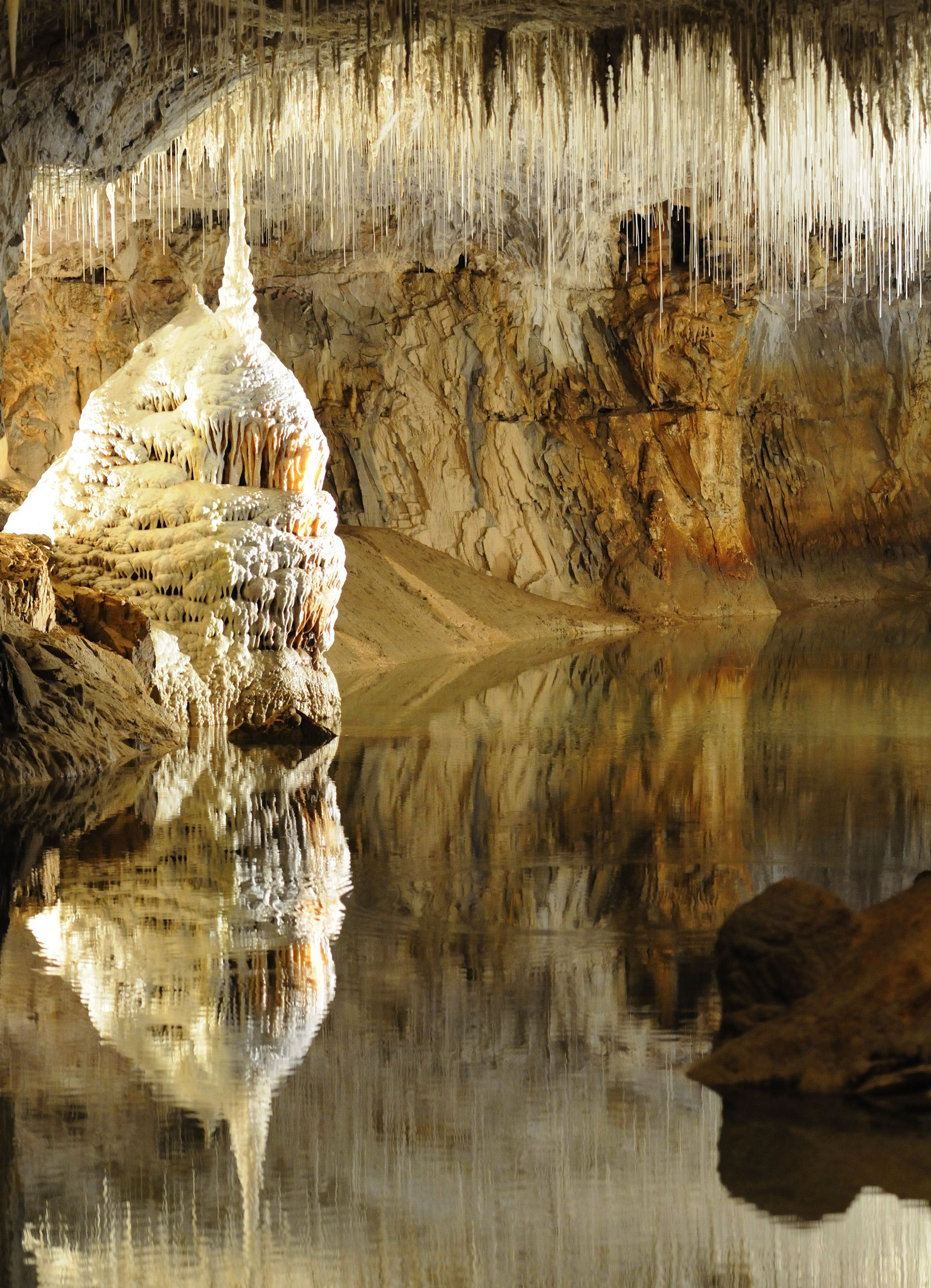
- Flowstone in Choranche cave.

- Location within France Location within Auvergne-Rhône-Alpes
- Location: Choranche, France
- Coordinates: 45°04′28.6″N 5°23′54.4″E
- Depth: + 425 metres (1,394 ft)
- Length: 32,301 metres (105,974 ft)
- Elevation: 574 metres (1,883 ft) Coufin
- Geology: Limestone

The cave of Choranche, also called cave of Coufin-Chevaline, is located in the department of Isère, near Choranche in the Vercors Regional Natural Park and in the Vercors Massif, France. Located at the edge of the massif, its road access is either via the A49 Grenoble – Valence motorway, or by a road entering the massif, near Grenoble.

The entrance to the cave is at the foot of the cliffss of Presles, forming a natural cirque bordering the Coulmes plateau in the Bourne gorge.

In November 2014, the Choranche Cave obtained the "Quality tourism" mark.

== History ==
=== Coufin Cave ===
Oscar Decombaz, on 7, explored up to the wet vault. In 1949, the defusing of the latter allowed Roger Pénelon and Sage to access Gruyère. In 1954, the Cyclops group went up the Mat waterfall (+116 m (381 ft)) (Note: In caving, the negative or positive measurements of height levels are defined in relation to at a reference point which is the known entrance to the network, the highest in altitude.) and stops at the foot of the large waterfall.

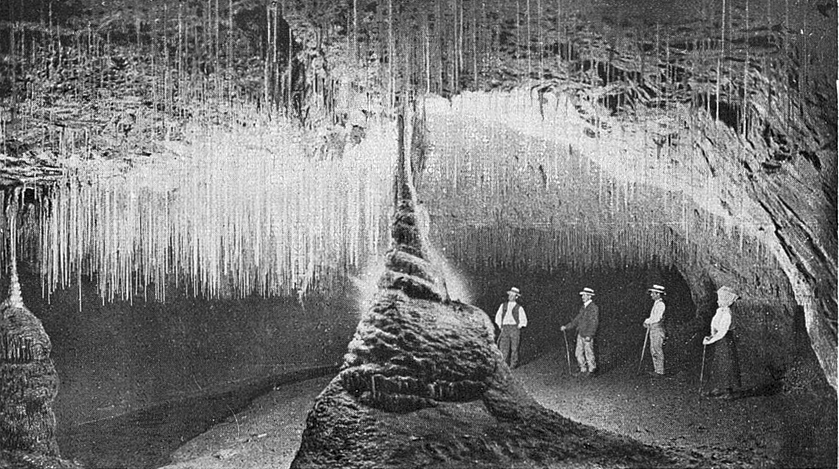
Grottes de Coufin in circa 1924

=== Chevaline Cave ===
In 1943, Roger Pénelon, André Bourgin, Sage and Gaché arrived at the cathedral. The speleologists of Grenoble of the CAF resumed explorations in 1960; they go up the river to the Shower. In 1966 the caving club of La Tronche and the Caving Club of the Seine created the junction between the two cavities. The Speleo Group of Valence has continued explorations since 1968. The known network develops 29,489 m (96,749 ft) meters for a positive height difference of 411 m (1,348 ft) on 1 January 1997. In 2009 the known development is 32,301 m (105,974 ft).

== Description ==
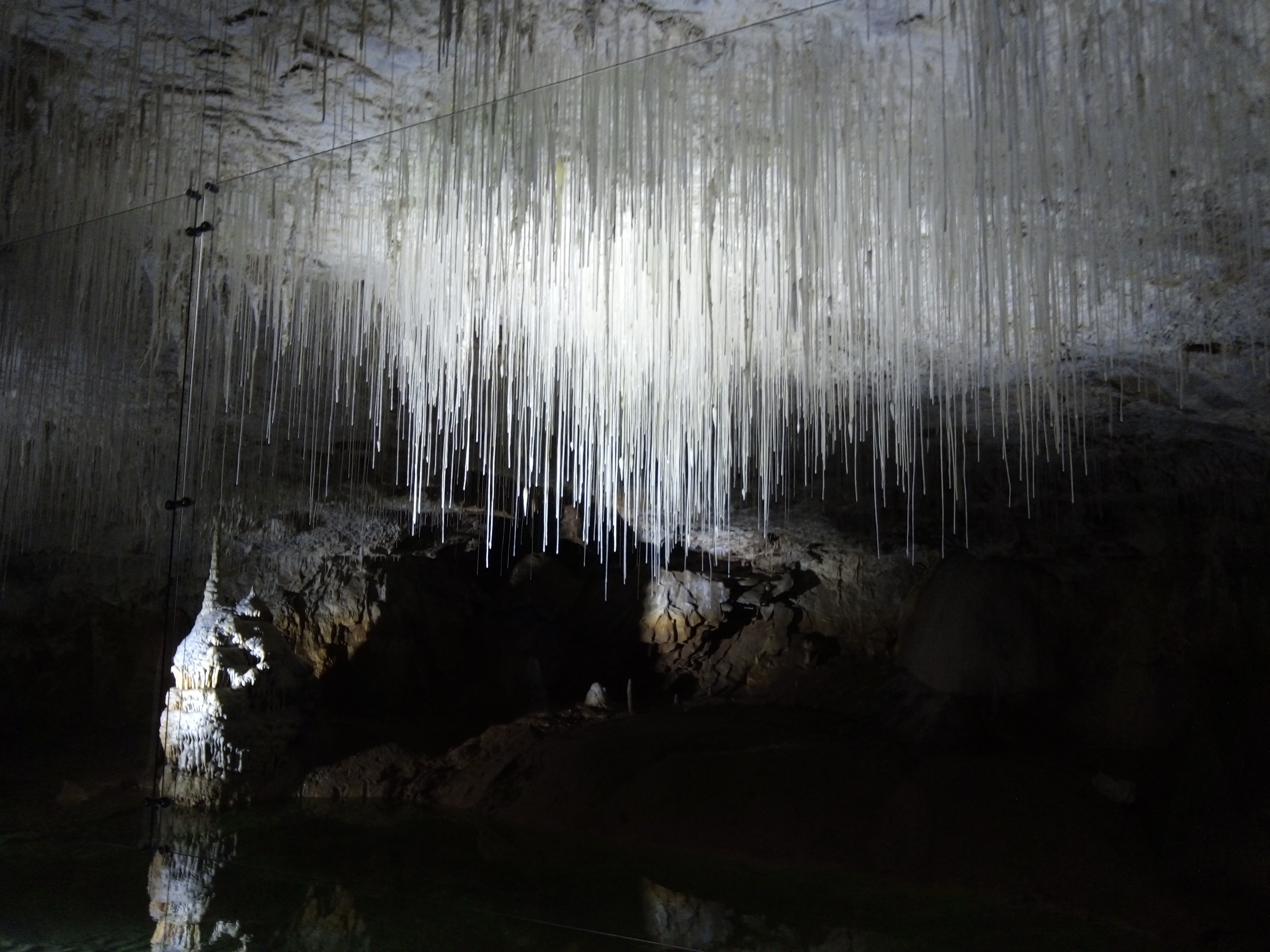
Soda straw

Like all karstics cavities, the cave of Choranche was dug by water (erosions hydraulics and hydrochemicals). The active networks are surmounted by large fossil galleries. It contains speleothems in calcite of varied shapes, particularly fistuloses, some of which reach a length of 3 meters. In addition to these concretions, the cave is crossed by the Serpentine, underground river forming rimstones and an underground lake from which the Karst spring flows in cascade in the "circus of Choranche". The origin of the underground river is to be found in the Coulmes massif.

== Species conservation ==
The Choranche Cave constitutes one of the two sites in France where resides (in captivity) the olm, species of blind salamander adapted to karstic caves. Originally from the caves of the Dinaric Alps of the western Balkans, this species was brought to Choranche as well as to the Clamouse cave as part of a research and project to protect the species.
