= Choranche =

- Commune
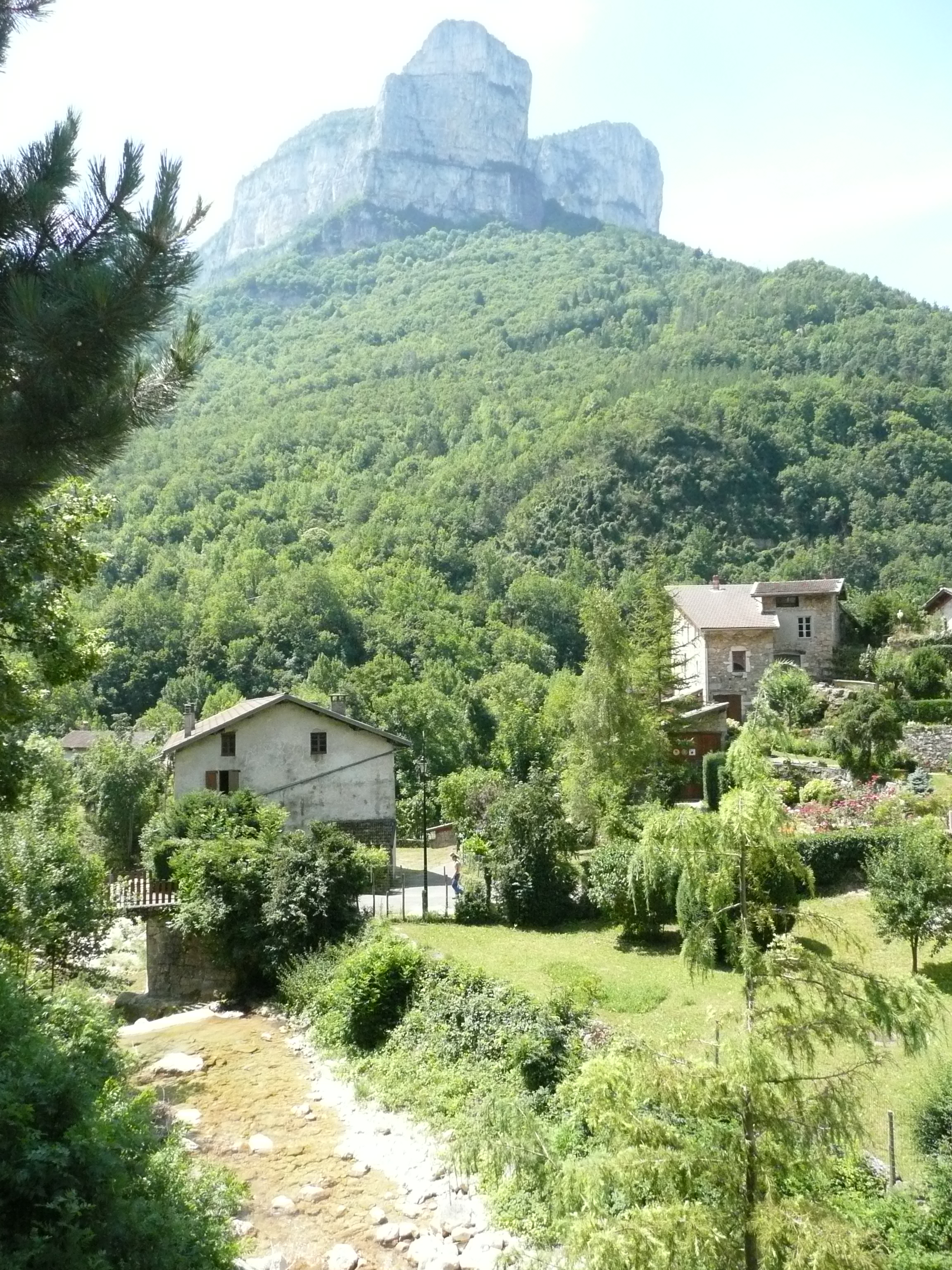
- A general view of Choranche
- Location of Choranche
- Location within France Location within Auvergne-Rhône-Alpes
- Coordinates: 45°04′04″N 5°23′30″E
- Country: France
- Region: Auvergne-Rhône-Alpes
- Department: Isère
- Arrondissement: Grenoble
- Canton: Le Sud Grésivaudan

Government
  - Mayor (2020–2026): Geneviève Moreau-Glenat
- Area^{1}: 10.63 km^{2} (4.10 sq mi)
- Highest elevation: 1,200 m (3,900 ft)
- Lowest elevation: 200 m (660 ft)
- Population (2023): 144
  - Density: 13.5/km^{2} (35.1/sq mi)
- Time zone: UTC+01:00 (CET)
  - Summer (DST): UTC+02:00 (CEST)
- INSEE/Postal code: 38108 /38680
- ^{1} French Land Register data, which excludes lakes, ponds, glaciers > 1 km^{2} (0.386 sq mi or 247 acres) and river estuaries.

Choranche (French pronunciation: [ʃɔʁɑ̃ʃ]; Occitan: Chaurança) is a commune in the Isère department in southeastern France.

Choranche Cave is located there. The grottoes were discovered end the 19th Century and hide a unique sight of fine stalactites.

== Population ==
Historical population
Year	Pop.	±% p.a.
1968	149	—
1975	115	−3.63%
1982	130	+1.77%
1990	132	+0.19%
1999	130	−0.17%
2007	134	+0.38%
2012	132	−0.30%
2017	121	−1.73%
2023	144	+2.94%
Source: INSEE

== See also ==
- Communes of the Isère department
- Parc naturel régional du Vercors
