= Grottes de Bétharram =

Cave in France

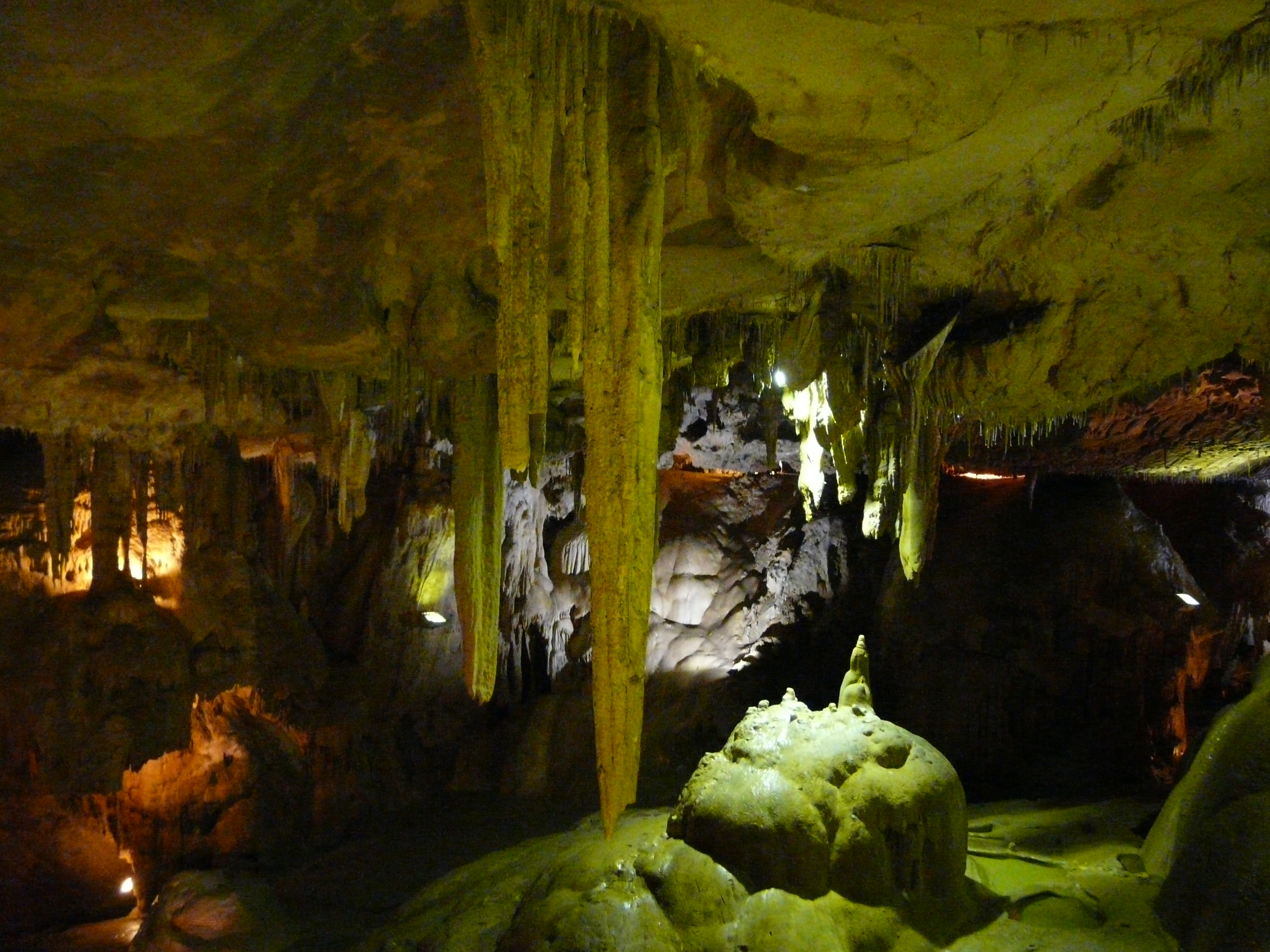
- L'intérieur des grottes de Bétharram.
- Interactive map of Grottes de Bétharram
- Location: Near Asson, Lestelle-Bétharram, Saint-Pé-de-Bigorre (Region: Nouvelle-Aquitaine and Occitanie); Massif des Pyrénées, France
- Coordinates: 43°05′59″N 0°11′37″W
- Valley: Gave de Pau en aval de Lourdes
- Voie d'accès: D 152

The Grottes de Bétharram (French pronunciation: [ɡʁɔt də betaʁam]) are a series of French caves located at the border of the Pyrénées-Atlantiques and Hautes-Pyrénées departments and of the Nouvelle-Aquitaine and Occitanie regions.

Located near Asson, Lestelle-Bétharram and Saint-Pé-de-Bigorre, they offer a threeway discovery: by foot, by boat and finally, by train, the key to similar cave formation. The entrance is located in Asson and the exit in Saint-Pé-de-Bigorre.

== Description ==
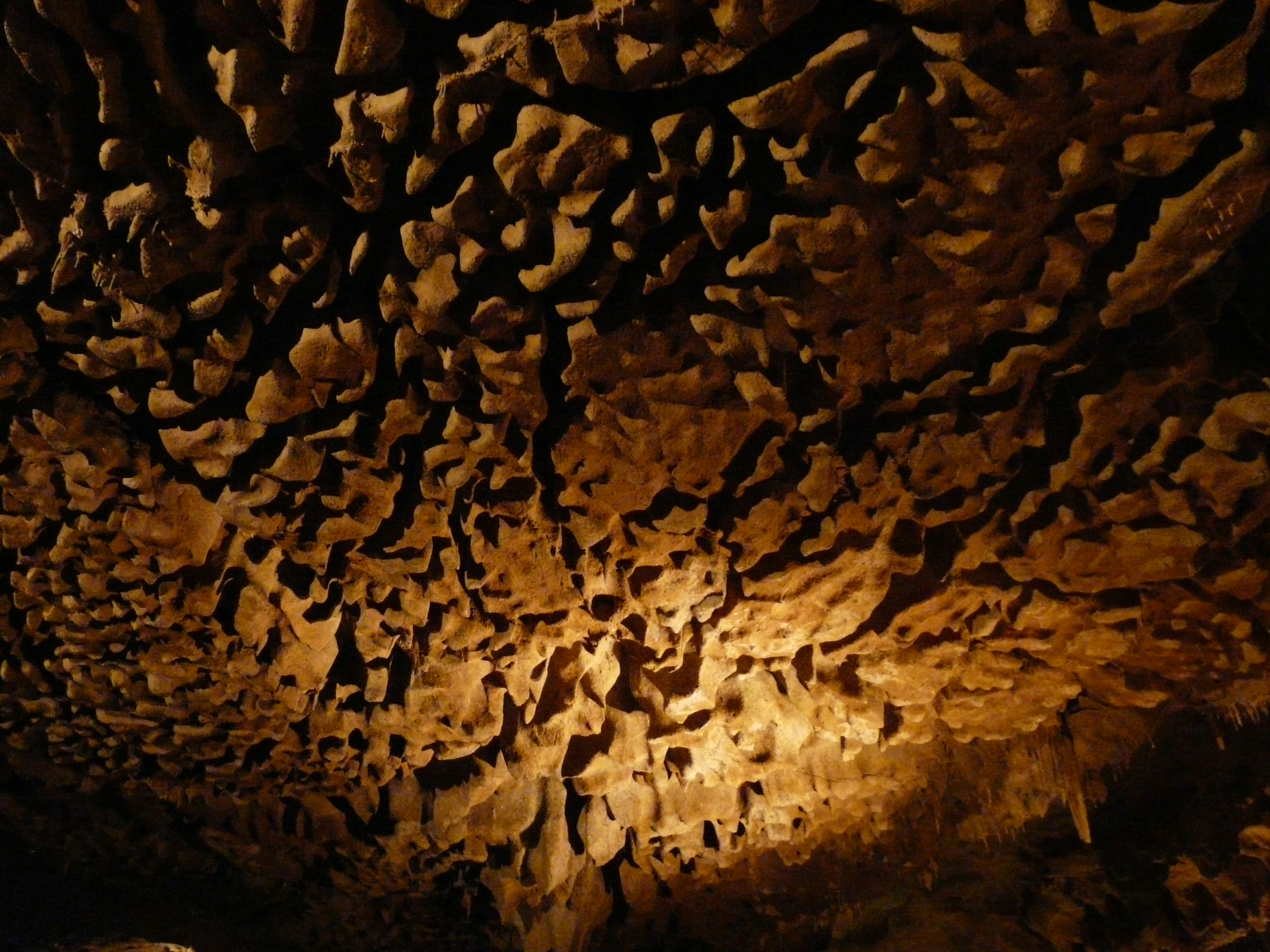
The striated ceiling.

A 2,8 km underground walk allows us to visit the three levels of river-dug galleries in the limestone mountain. The largest, upper part, formed by rooms openly accessible to each other, is namely interesting for its spongy ceilings, many of long range. The ancient riverbed that one then follows is a narrow and deep fissure where can be observed curious erosion phenomenons. The lower level corresponds to the present river level that one follows shortly by rowing boat. A 400 m long artificial tunnel brings us back to the surface. At the mountain's exit, the river joins the gave de Pau.

== History ==
Discovered in 1819, it was one of the first caves open to the public. From 1880, English residents from Pau came to venture thanks to the help of miller Losbats de Lestelle-Bétharram. After a few years of labour, Léon Ross, artist-painter and one of the Pyrenees first photographers, opened them to the public in 1903, before equipping them with electricity, while introducing this new convenience (light) to the locals.
