= Gouffre Jean-Bernard =

Cave in France

- Interactive map of Gouffre Jean-Bernard
- Location: Samoëns
- Coordinates: 46°6′8″N 6°46′46.6″E
- Depth: 1,612 m (5,289 ft)
- Length: 29,558 metres (18.366 mi)
- Discovery: 1963
- Geology: Cretaceous limestone
- Entrances: about 13
- Cave survey

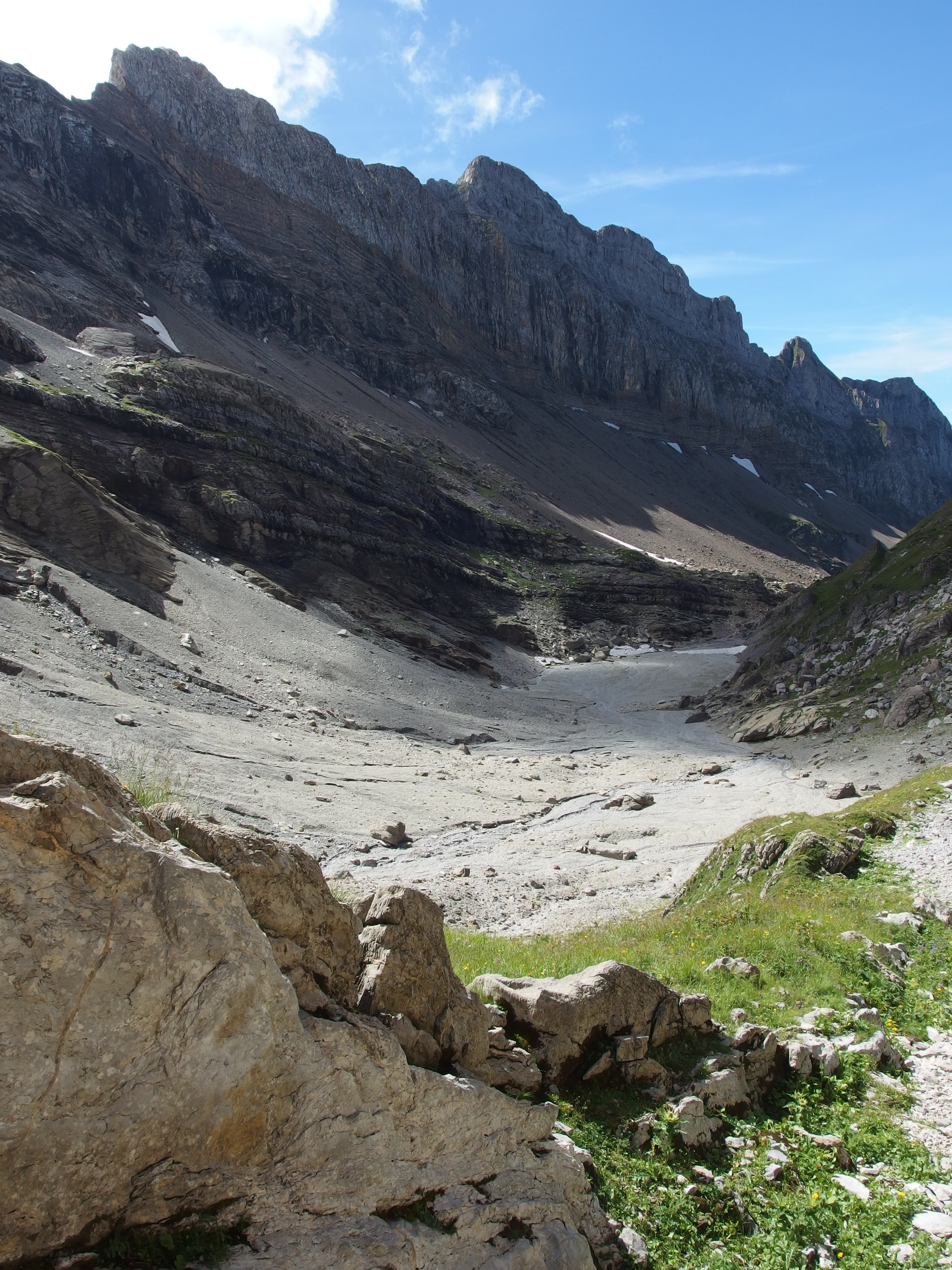
Le vallon des Chambres

Gouffre Jean-Bernard or Réseau Jean Bernard, sometimes known simply as Jean Bernard, is the seventh deepest cave in the world, and the third deepest cave in Europe. It is in the Alps in Samoëns, France. The first entrance to the cave was found by the French caving group Groupe Vulcain in 1963. More entrances have been found over the years since, and currently at least thirteen are known. The highest entrance, known as C37, is at 2,333 m (7,654 ft) above sea level. The cave is named after Jean Dupont and Bernard Raffy, two Groupe Vulcain members who died in 1963 in an unrelated expedition in Goule de Foussoubie Cave.

== Exploration ==
The first entrance, known as V4, was discovered in 1963 and exploration in that year took the cave to a depth of 100 metres (330 ft). Further explorations in the following year reached the main drain, or master cave, of the system at a depth of −210 m (−690 ft). (Note: In caving, the depth of a cave is determined by the difference between the altitude of the highest entrance, and the lowest part of the system.) This was further explored downstream in 1965 and 1966, reaching the base of a wet shaft, the Puits des Affreux, at −380 m (−1,250 ft). Explorations in 1968 reached Puits de la Rivière at −450 m (−1,480 ft). A major expedition in 1969, attended by many French cavers, reached a sump at −623 metres (−2,044 ft).

In the upper part of the Vallon des Chambres, Gouffre B19 at an altitude of 2,118 metres (6,949 ft), which had been discovered in 1968, was explored down to −450 m (−1,480 ft). In 1975, winter expeditions began. The −900 m (−3,000 ft) elevation was exceeded on 4 January and at −938 m (−3,077 ft), the Salle des Crêpes was discovered two days later, marking the end of explorations for that year. The Gouffre B19 was connected to the network on the first of November, giving a system depth of 1,208 m (3,963 ft).

The sump at −1,298 m (−4,259 ft) was reached on 1 January 1976. In July 1979, exploration of Gouffre B21 at an altitude of 2,237 metres (7,339 ft) allowed the network to become the deepest in the world with a depth of −1,358 m (−4,455 ft). It remained so until January 1998, when its depth was surpassed by Gouffre Mirolda.

In 1980, 1981, 1982 in February, three sumps were dived increasing the depth to 1,494 metres (4,902 ft), progress being stopped by a fourth impenetrable sump. In August 1983, Gouffre B22 at 2,194 m (7,198 ft) was explored and connected to the B21, giving access to the upstream galleries which allowed the system to exceed the −1,500 m (−4,900 ft) difference in height at −1,535 m (−5,036 ft). At that point, further exploration was blocked by a water-filled passage.

More recent explorations have increased the depth to 1,612 m (5,289 ft), making it the seventh deepest cave known in the world.

== Karst Development ==
The Gouffre Jean Bernard is located in a synclinal valley (Vallon des Chambres). The various entrances are located on the north-eastern flank of the syncline between 1,800 m (5,900 ft) and 2,300 m (7,500 ft) above sea level and are perpendicular to the master cave. The master cave flows close to the Urgonian Limestone-Hauterivian marl contact in a meander 2 m (6.6 ft) to 3 m (9.8 ft) wide. The resurgence is located at an altitude of 780 m (2,560 ft) in le Clévieux stream. The passages of 10 m (33 ft) to 15 m (49 ft) in diameter that are found in the upper part of the network are fossil passages developed before the incision of the Giffre valley.

== See also ==
- Gouffre Mirolda
- List of caves
- Speleology
- List of deepest caves
