= La Mansonnière Cave =

Chalk cave in France

Coordinates: 48.4174707°N 0.7600848°E

La Mansonnière Cave is a chalk cave in Rémalard en Perche in northern France. It was discovered in 1977.

== Discovery ==
La Mansonnière Cave was discovered by the Speleo Club du Rond Point de L'Aigle (SCRPLA) in 1977. The discovery was published in the bulletin printed by La MJC de l'Aigle and was reported to the French Federation of Speleology at the St Etienne de Rouvray Conference.

== Origins ==
The cave was originally called La Grotte de Bellou sur Huisne, after the name of the local commune in southeastern Orne county, Normandy. It lies in a disused chalk mine used at the time as a mushroom farm. The entrances were walled up, but permission was obtained to gain entry to the labyrinth, referred to by the mushroom workers as 'clay pockets'. It was clear that extensive digging could link up the truncated sections to lengthen the cave from 140 metres to more than one kilometre, making it one of the longest chalk caves. The tunnels are about 1.5 metres high but are extensively choked with sediment.

== Exploration ==
French cavers later renamed the cave and engaged in extensive digging, removing much of the valuable varve deposits which the SCRPLA had hoped to preserve for study by professional soil scientists. The SCRPLA produced a study of the cave which has since been added to by other groups. The cave suffered considerable vandalism when the mushroom farm ceased activity, but has since been re-gated. The cave is not related to any current hydrogeological system. There are very extensive (30 km) active karst systems under the nearby Pays d'Ouche district although extensive exploration by the SCRPLA has not managed to penetrate any of these. However, they have located detailed descriptions of at least one cave explored by the Parisian water authorities in the nineteenth century.
