= Aven des Corneilles =

Coordinates: 44.3072043°N 3.4583616°E

Aven des Corneilles is a cave located in the Cévennes National Park, in the Lozère département, near Sainte-Enimie.

The sinkhole entrance to the cave is surrounded by forest. The cave is decorated with Gours and contains fixed ladders and traverse lines, as well as some digging equipment. There is substantial graffiti in the earlier parts of the cave.
