= La Verna Cave =

Show cave in France

Coordinates: 42.979327°N 0.796169°W

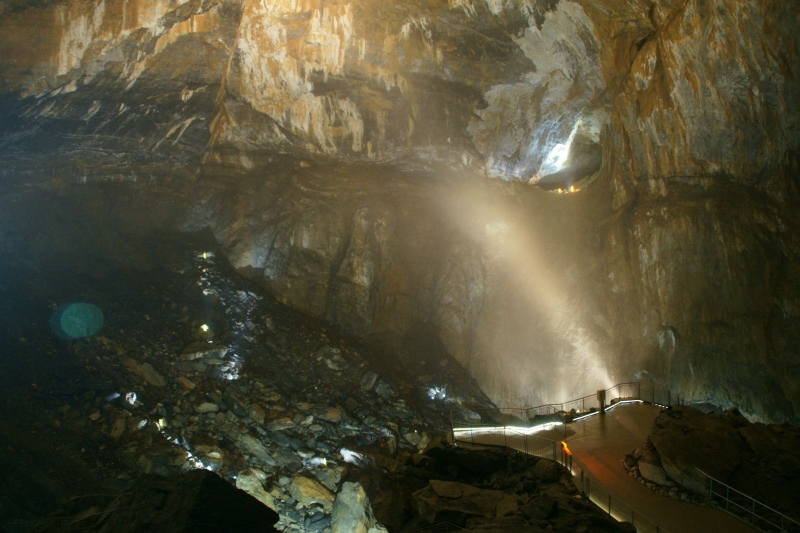
Platform overlooking Salle de la Verna

La Verna is a show cave in the commune of Sainte-Engrâce in the department of Pyrénées-Atlantiques in France. 660 metres (2,170 ft) of mined tunnel leads into the Salle de la Verna, the largest chamber in a show cave in the world. It has a diameter of 250 metres (820 ft), a height of 194 metres (636 ft), a surface area of 5 hectares (12 acres) and a volume of 3.6 million cubic metres (130,000,000 cu ft). A river cascades into the chamber from halfway up the east wall, and sinks into boulders near the base of the chamber.

The chamber was named after the Lyon scouts, La Verna Troop, who helped in the attempted rescue of Marcel Loubens who died following a fall during the 1952 explorations.

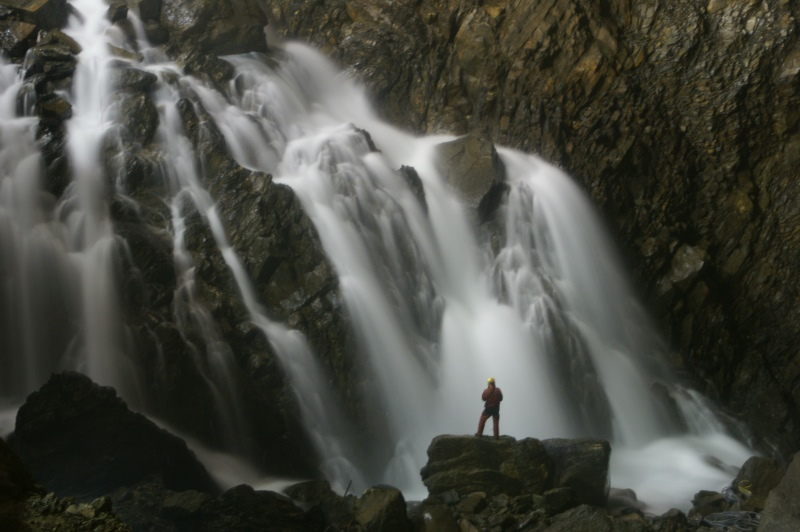
Waterfall in Salle de la Verna

In 2003 a standard 4 person hot-air balloon was flown in Salle de la Verna.

== Geology ==
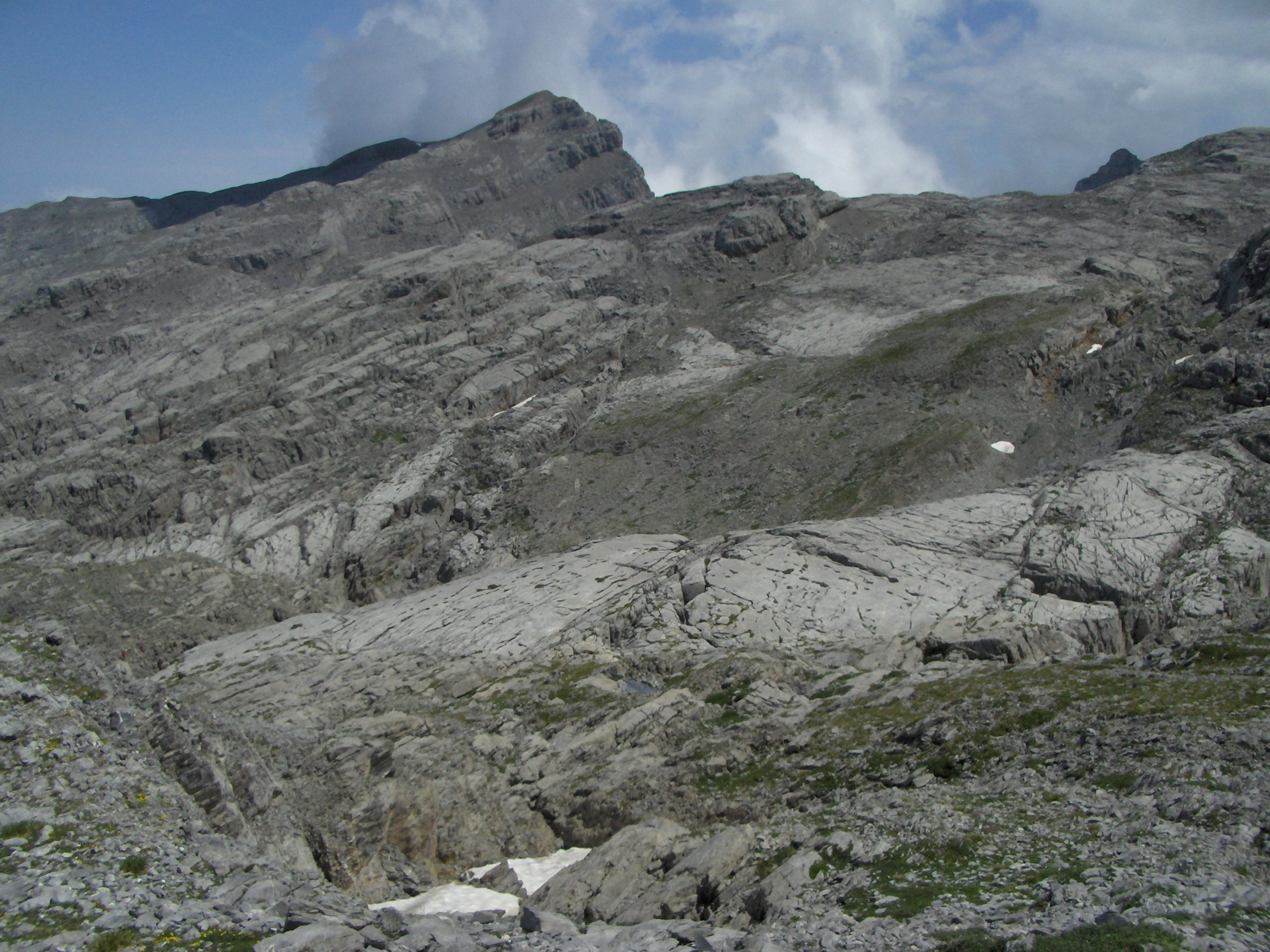
Near the Gouffre des Partages

La Verna is part of the 86-kilometre-long (53 mi), 1,410-metre-deep (4,630 ft), Gouffre de la Pierre Saint-Martin and Gouffre des Partages cave system which has fourteen known entrances. Explorations still continue in this and in other systems within the extensive Pierre-Saint-Martin karst area where 13 underground rivers and a total of 288 kilometres (179 mi) of passages, chambers and shafts have been mapped.

Most of the Gouffre de la Pierre-Saint-Martin is formed by dissolution in Cretaceous limestones, and the main river reaches a base level where it flows over insoluble schists of the Paleozoic basement rocks. The Salle de la Verna has formed where the river flows off the schist onto Devonian limestone. Over time, the river found a route through the soluble limestones, leaving the original downstream river passage (the Gallerie Aranzadi) high and dry. The chamber was formed by a process of solution and collapse, beginning about 200,000 years ago. The unconformity between the Paleozoic and Mesozoic rocks is clearly exposed in the walls of the chamber.

The river flowing through the chamber originated from the infiltration zones on the 2,000-metre-high (6,600 ft) limestone plateaus, and emerges at springs 1,500 metres (4,900 ft) lower, in the valley of Saint-Engrâce.

== Fauna ==
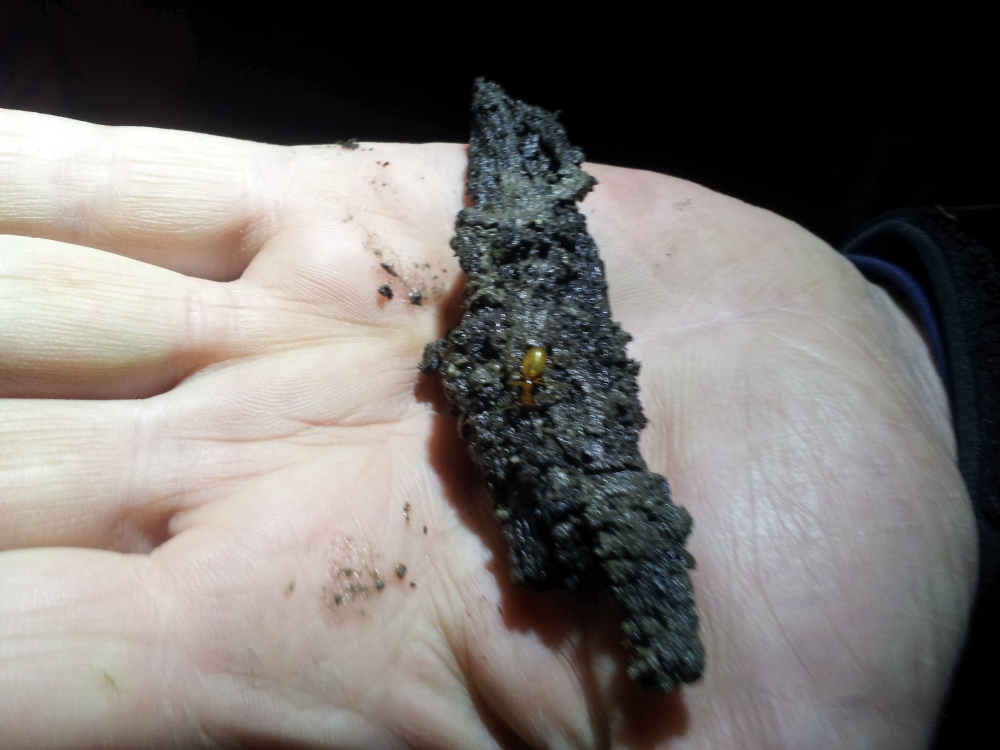
Aphaenops ochsi cabidochei in the salle de La Verna

In this mineral world lives a unique community of animals, adapted to the dark depths of the karst. They are small invertebrates, blind, and without pigmentation. The two most common species observed in La Verna are the Aphaenops loubensi and Aphaenops ochsi. In order to survive, these insects need an atmosphere saturated with humidity. After fecundation, the female lays a single egg, out of which a small larva hatches. Contrary to insects on the surface, this larva immediately metamorphoses to an adult, without feeding. The biologist Michel Cabidoche studied these animals in the 60’s. Since the opening of la Verna to visitors, in 2010, a team of researchers of the French national museum of natural history, under the leadership of Professor Arnaud Faille, closely follows their evolution.

== History ==
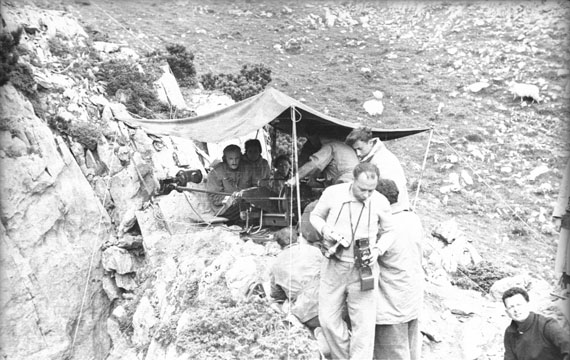
Expédition of 1952 to the gouffre de la Pierre Saint-Martin.

- 1950-51: The discovery and exploration of the 320-metre (1,050 ft) deep Lépineux shaft in the massif of La Pierre Saint Martin (at the time the deepest shaft ever descended).
- 13 August 1952, 10:15 PM: Marcel Loubens (1923-1952) died as a result of his injuries sustained from a fall during the explorations. He died 36 hours after the fall, which fractured his skull and spine, and also put him into a coma which he never recovered from.
- 13 August 1953: Georges Lépineux, Jimmy Théodor, Daniel Eppely, Michel Letrône and Georges Ballandraux, divided into two groups, discovered Salle de la Verna. One group opened the way, the other follows surveying as they went. They met in Salle de la Verna, where they inscribed their names. They had found what was at the time - and remained for many years - the world’s largest known underground chamber. They had also set a depth-record.
- 1956-60: The French National Electricity Company (EDF) decided to construct a tunnel. The plan was to capture the underground river that runs through the Salle de la Verna for the production of electricity. It took four years to dig the tunnel, but the project was abandoned for technical reasons. Cavers began using the tunnel as a short cut to continue their explorations.
- 2000: A private company, SHEM (Société Hydroélectrique du Midi) re-launched the hydro-electric power project.
- January 2006: Work on the project began. An access-road was constructed and the tunnel restored. A dam was built across the river where it enters the Salle de la Verna creating a small reservoir of 200 cubic metres (7,100 cu ft). More than 3 kilometres (1.9 mi) of pressure pipe were installed across the chamber, out through the tunnel, and down to the bottom of the valley where a hydro-electric power-plant was built. Close cooperation between SHEM, cavers and the local authorities has led to the opening of la Verna to the public.
- June 2007: The local authorities working together as a SIVU (Syndicat intercommunal à vocation unique) confirmed the exploitation of the site by the Caving Associations of the Atlantic Pyrenees. To achieve this, the cavers created a small company, which organizes guided visits.
- 1 July 2010: La Verna opened to the public. The cave is now accessible to everybody - including those with reduced mobility.
