= Show cave =

Cave made accessible to the general public for guided visits

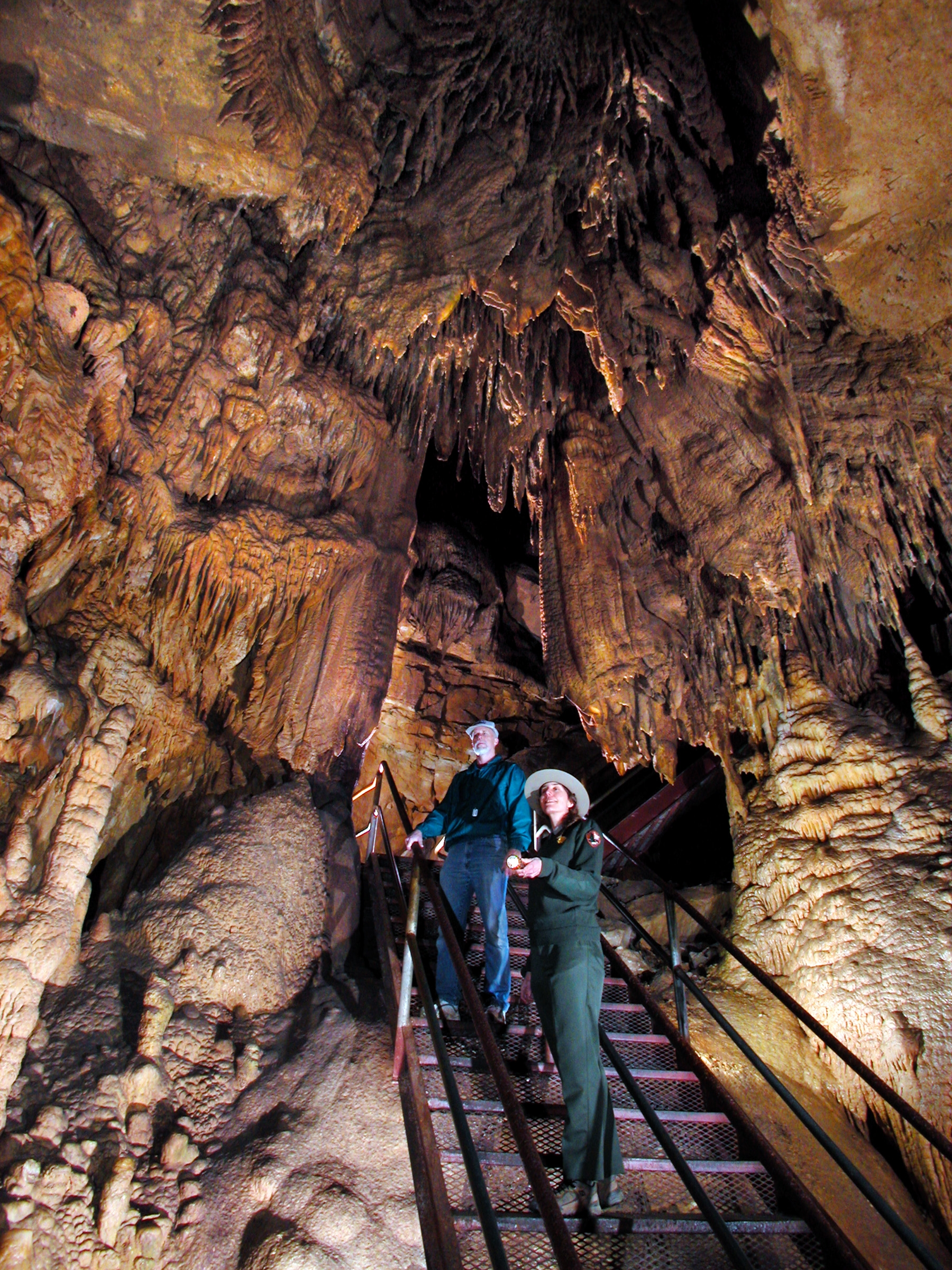
Trail stairs in Mammoth Cave, United States

A show cave—also called tourist cave, public cave, and, in the United States, commercial cave—is a cave which has been made accessible to the public for guided visits.

== Definition ==
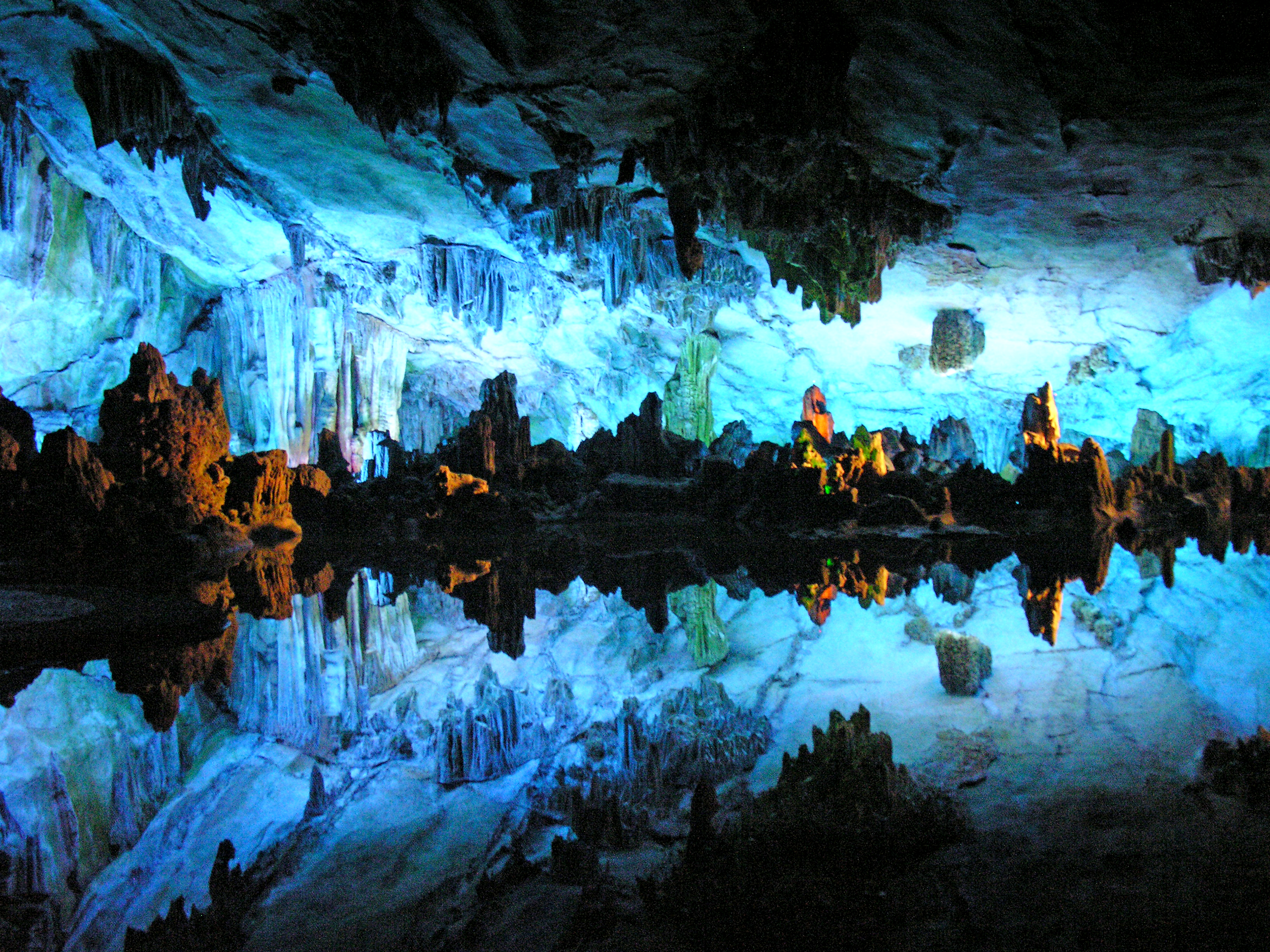
An artificial complex illumination in Reed Flute Cave, China

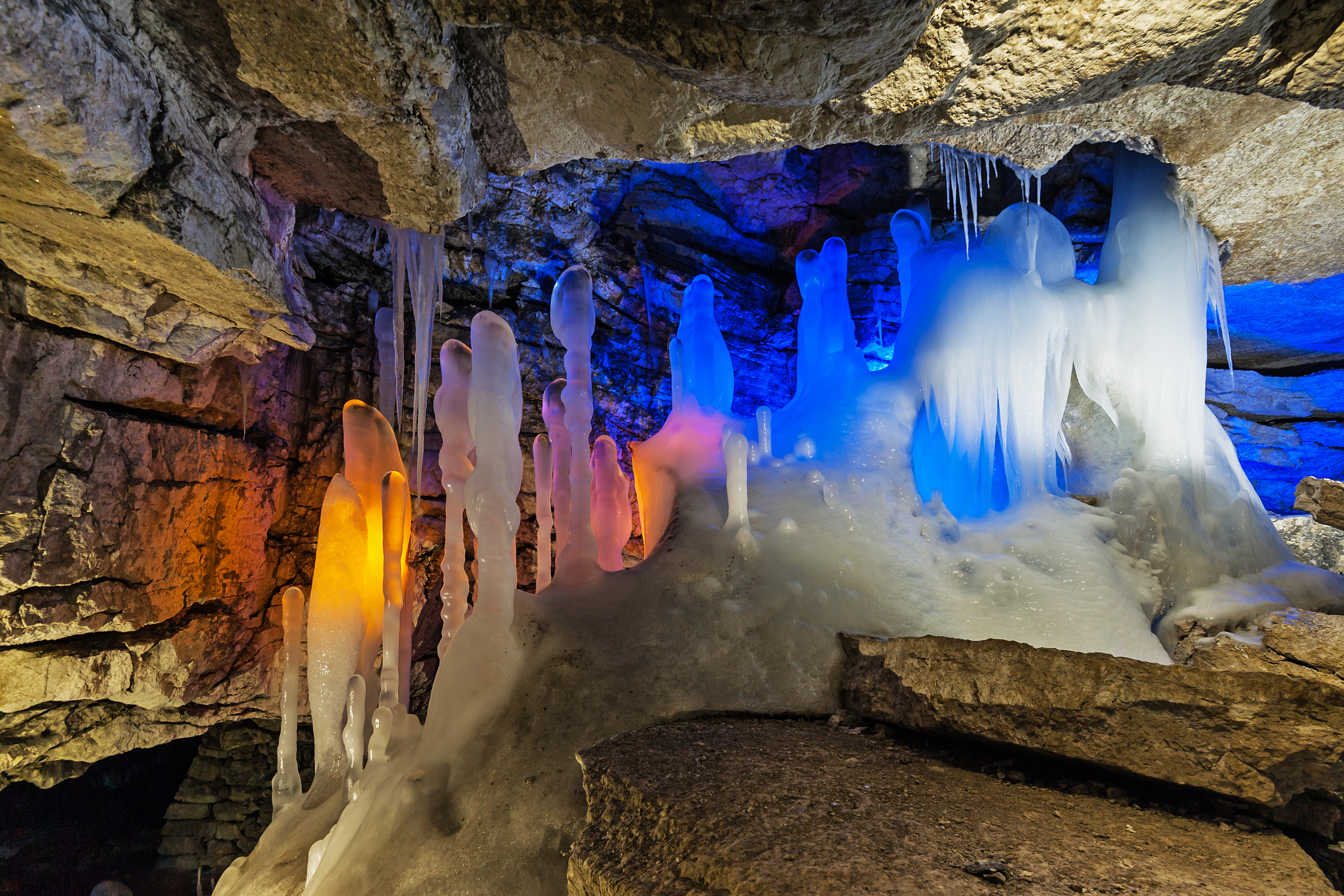
Color-highlighted ice in Kungur Ice Cave, Russia

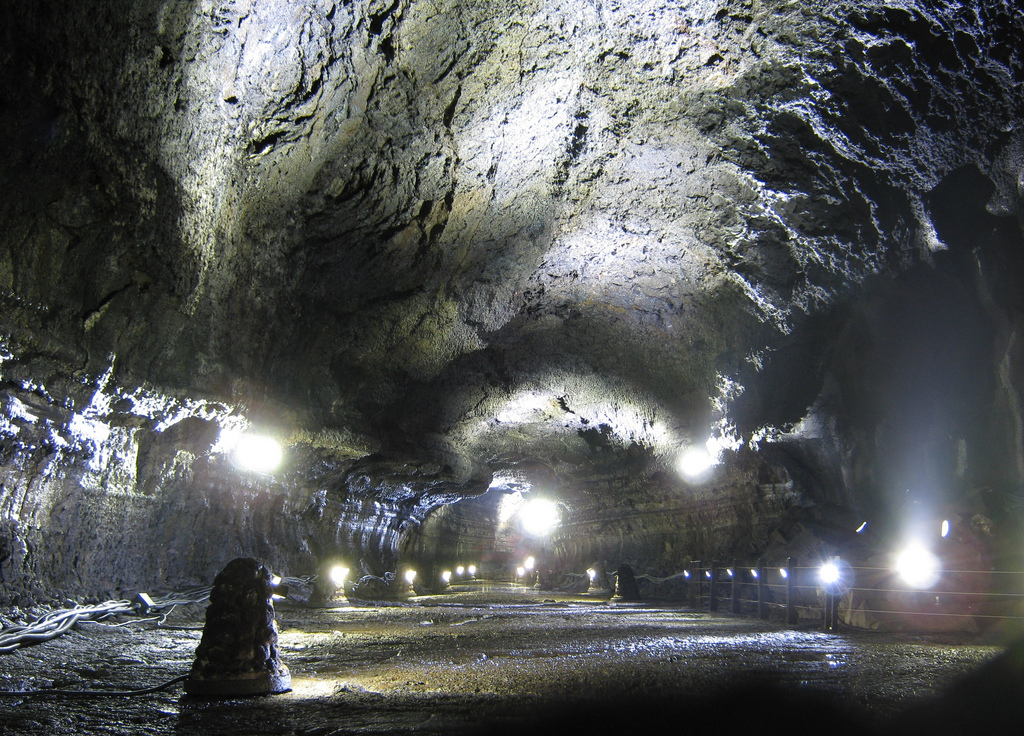
Lighting in Manjanggul lava tube, Jeju, South Korea

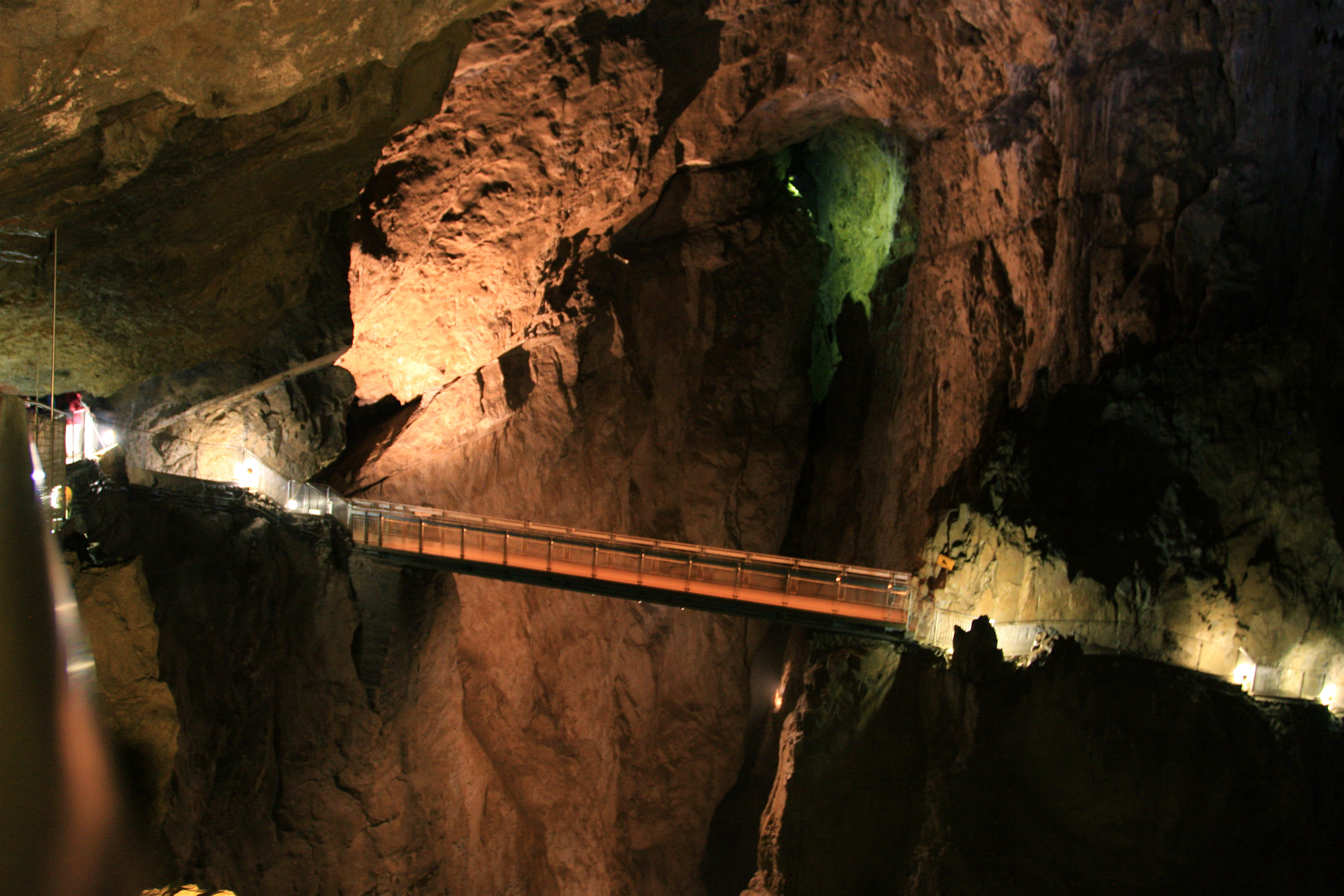
A bridge in Škocjan Caves, Slovenia

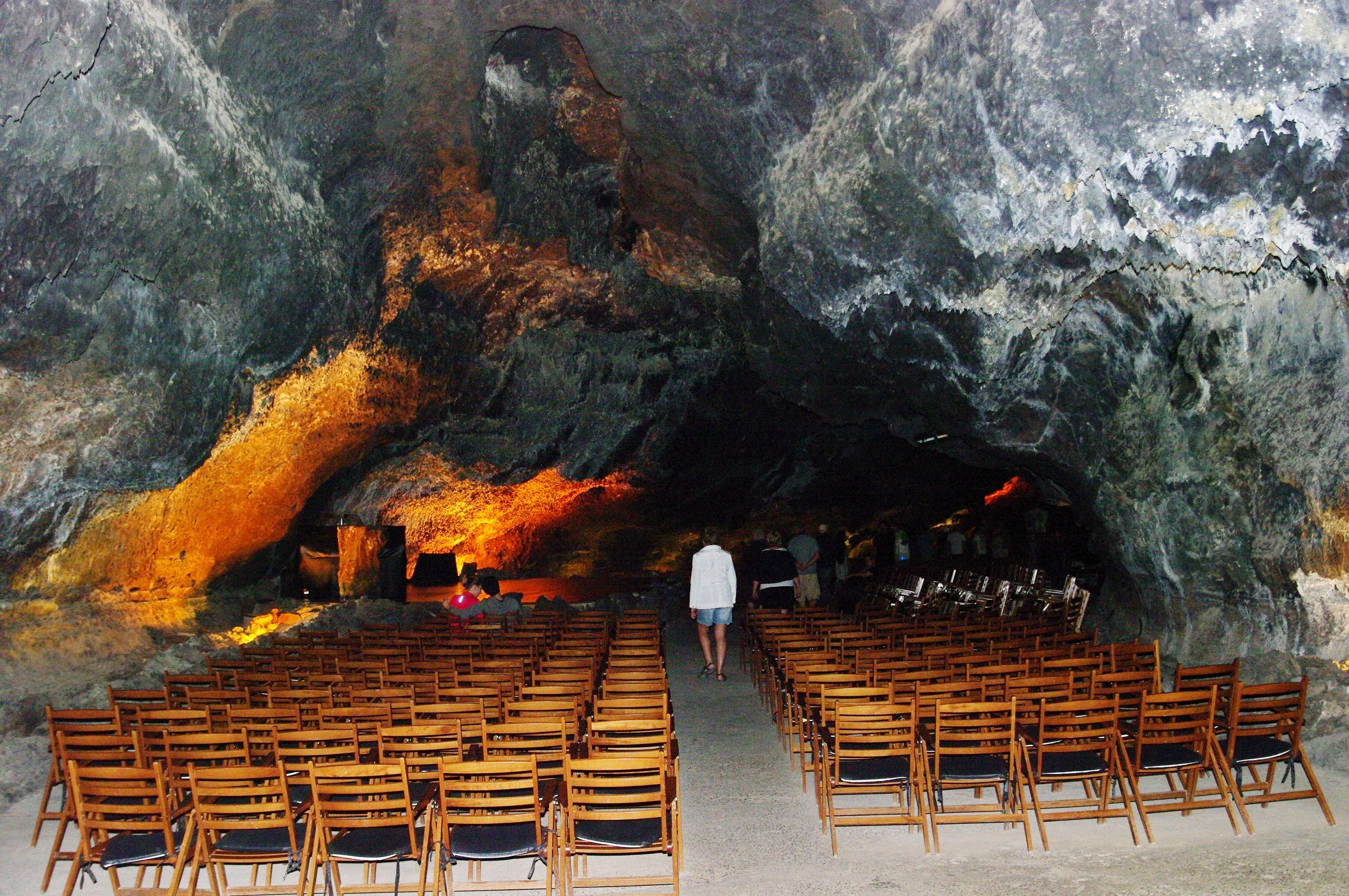
A concert hall in Cueva de los Verdes, Lanzarote, Spain

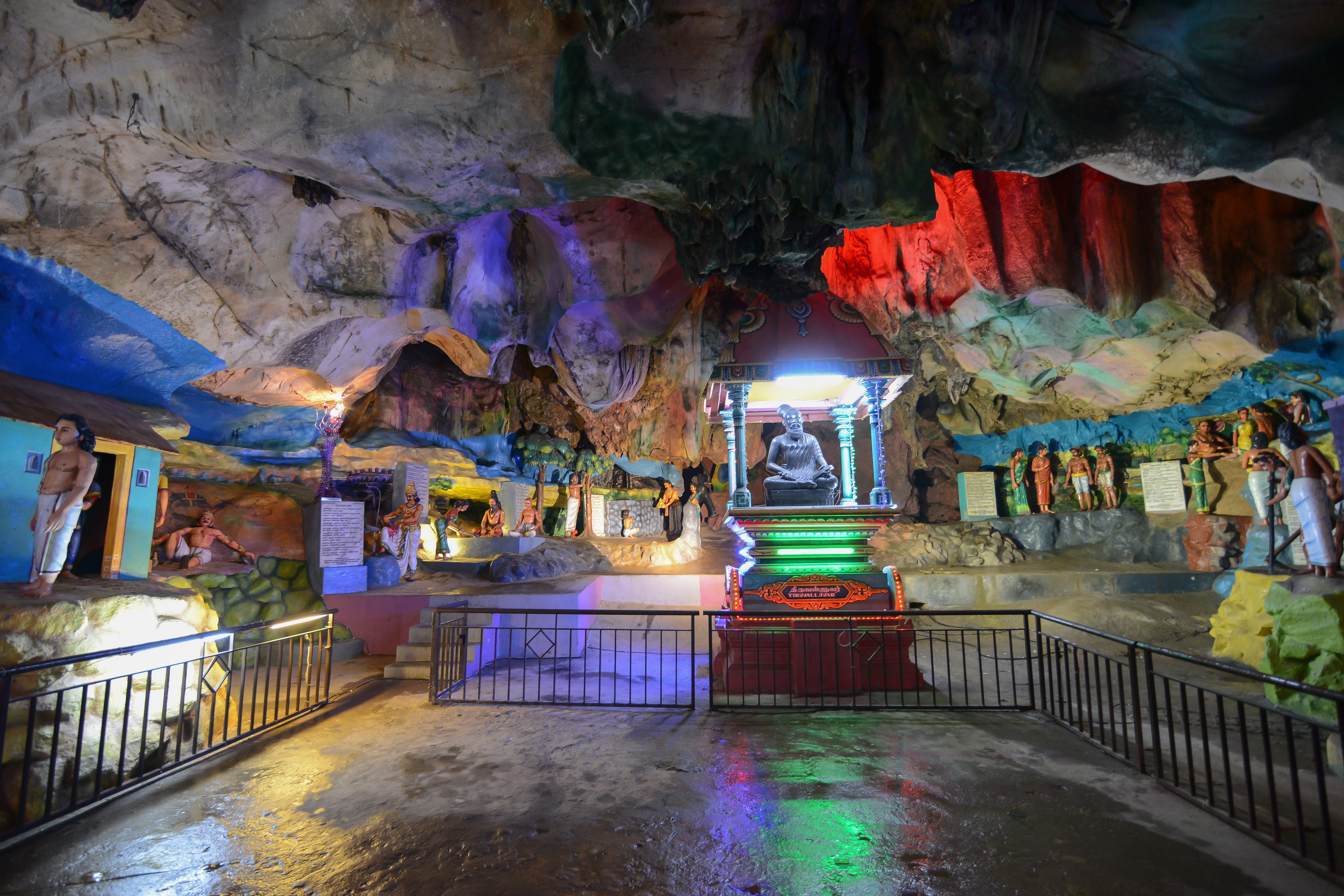
Statues in Batu Caves, Malaysia

A show cave is a cave that has been made accessible to the public for guided visits, where a cave is defined as a natural occurring void beneath the surface of the earth, per the International Show Caves Association.

A show cave may be managed by a government or commercial organization and made accessible to the general public, usually for an entrance fee. Unlike wild caves, they may possess regular opening hours, guided group tours, constructed trails and stairs, color artificial illumination and other lighting, musical/video/laser shows and concerts, elevators, small trains, and boats if they contain underground water features, such as subterranean lakes. Some caves (mainly in Asia) open to the public have temples, monasteries and religious statues or monuments. They are often important tourist attractions - in 2012 Mammoth Cave was said to receive 400,000 visitors a year.

== History ==
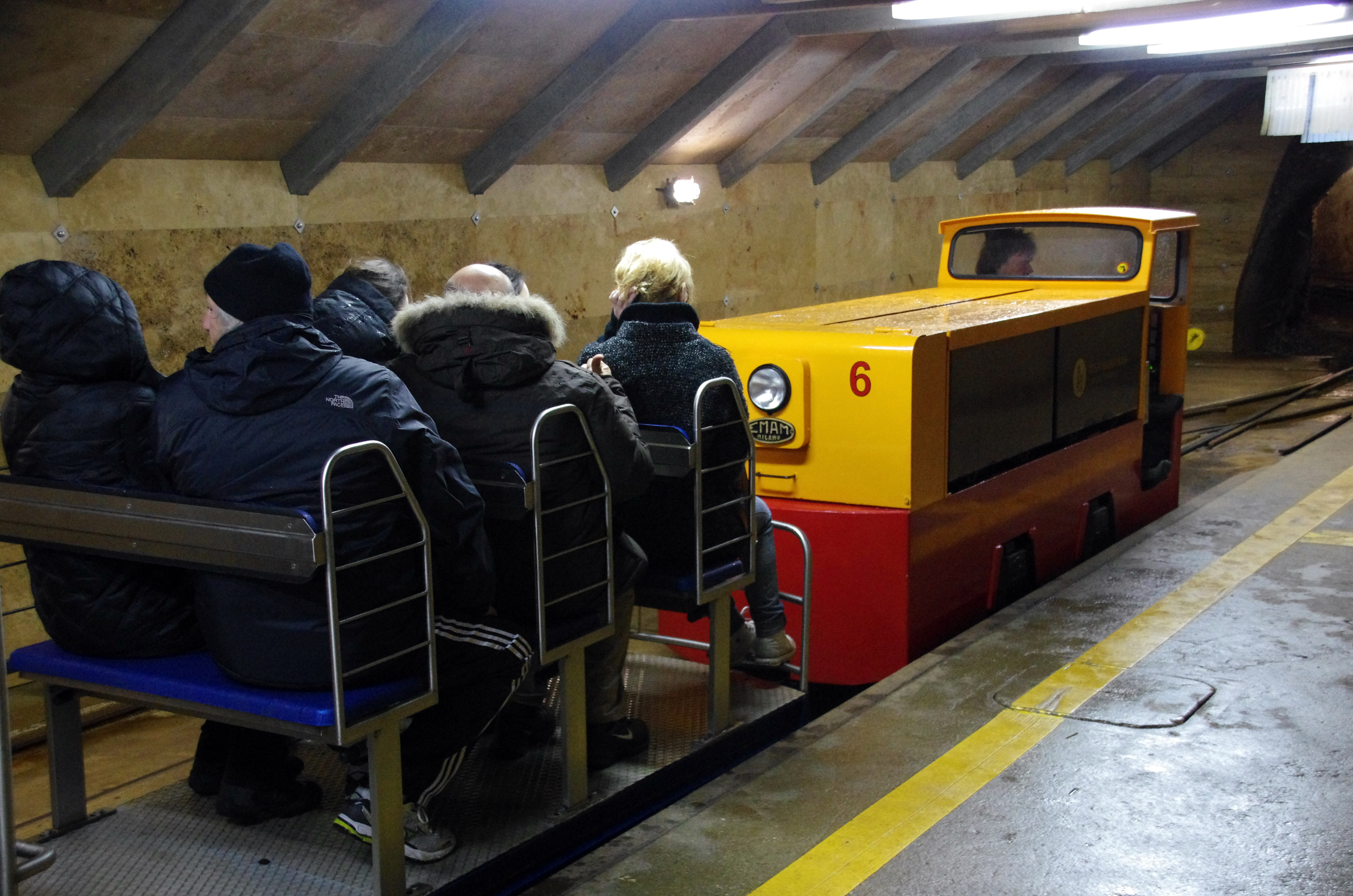
A small chair train to Postojna Cave, Slovenia

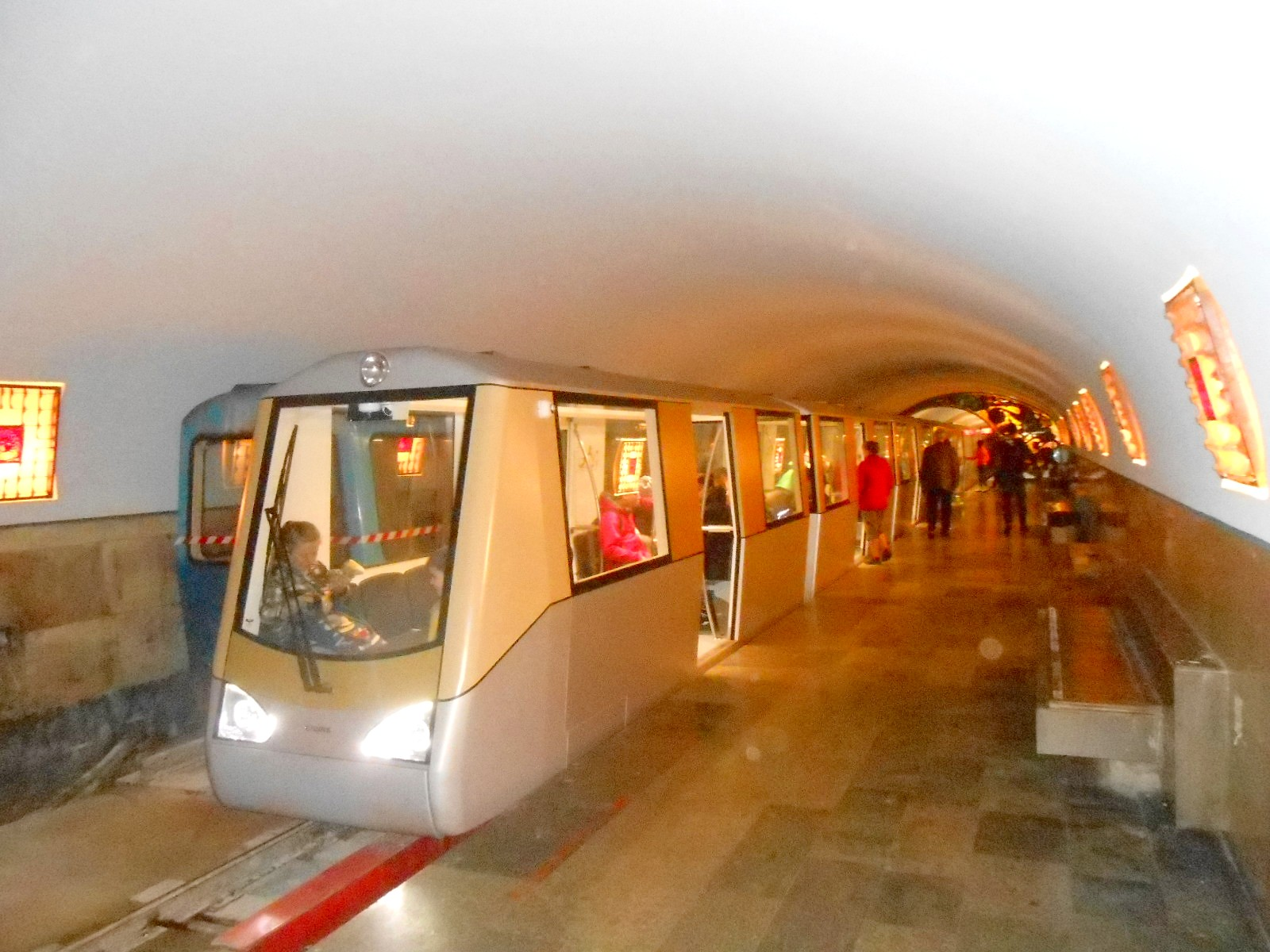
A mini-metro train to New Athos Cave, Georgia

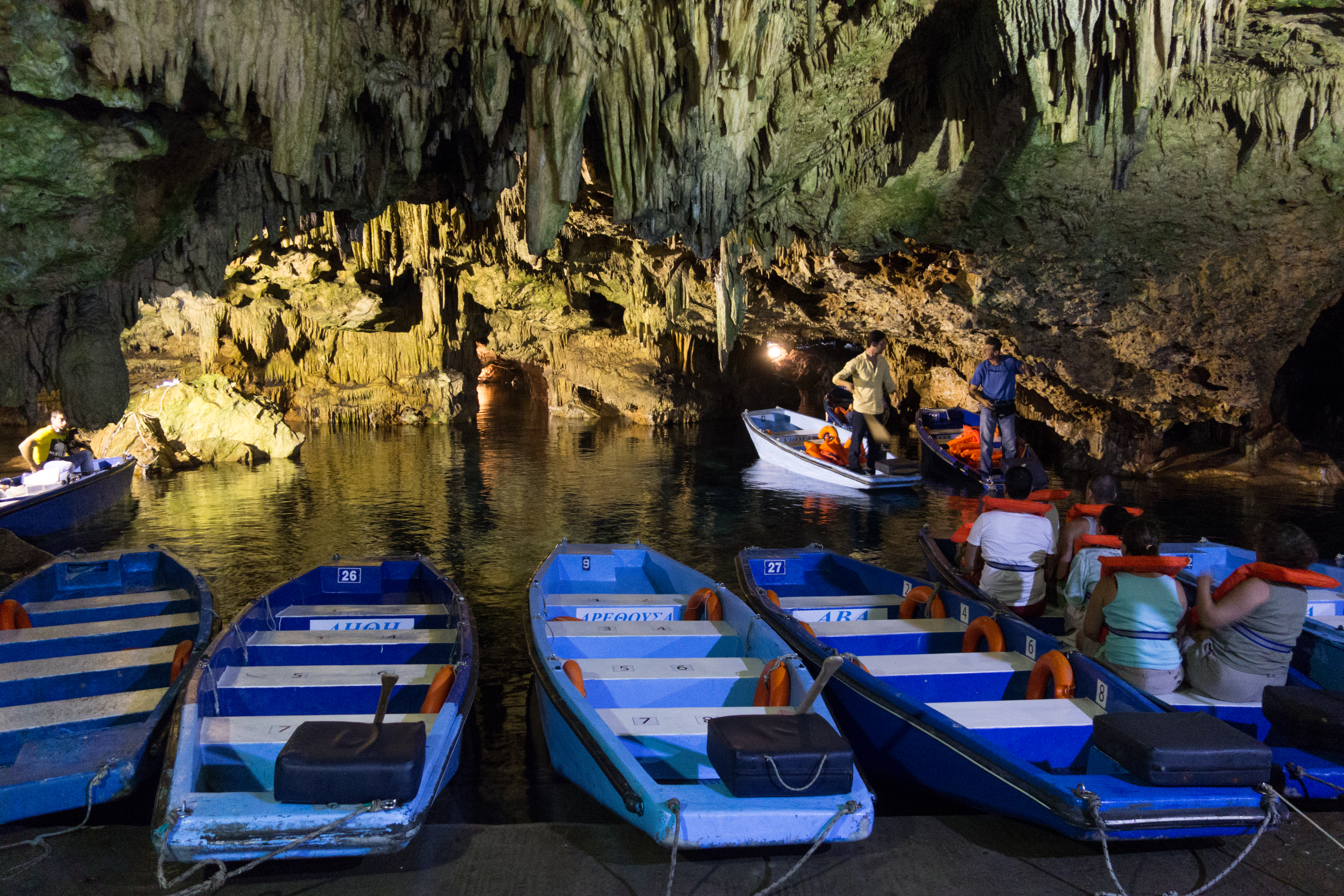
Boats to Glyfada Cave/Dirou Pyrgos Caves, Greece

The oldest known show cave in the world is probably Reed Flute Cave in China with inscriptions from 792 in the time of the Tang dynasty. Other old show caves are Postojna Cave in Slovenia, with the presumed first record of a cave tour in 1213. Other early show caves are Jasov Cave in Slovakia with inscriptions from 1452, the Sontheimer Höhle in Germany which was reportedly visited by Herzog Ulrich von Württemberg on 20 May 1516 and Vilenica Cave in Slovenia where entrance fees were taken from 1633 on. In 1649, the first "authorized" cave guide started guiding Baumannshöhle in the Harz in Germany though this cave was intensively visited much earlier.

The development of electric lighting enabled the illumination of show caves. Early experiments with electric light in caves were carried out by Lieutenant Edward Cracknel in 1880 at Chifley Cave, Jenolan Caves, Australia. In 1881, Sloupsko-Šošůvské Jeskyně, Czech Republic, became the first cave in the world with electric arc light. This light did not use light bulbs, but electric arc lamps with carbon electrodes, which burned down and had to be replaced after some time.

The first cave in the world with electric light bulbs as we know them today was the Kraushöhle in Austria in 1883. But the light was abandoned after only seven years and then visited with carbide lamps for decades. Today the cave is guided with handheld LED lamps. In 1884, two more caves were equipped with electric light, Postojna Cave, Slovenia, and Olgahöhle, Germany.

Because of the unwanted development of lampenflora (algae attracted to heat and light) around incandescent electric lights in show caves, many of these attractions, such as Ingleborough Cave in England, have switched to cooler-temperature LED lighting.

== Notable examples ==
Name	Country/Countries	Notes
Aggtelek Karst and Slovak Karst Caves	Hungary; Slovakia	On the Subterranean World Heritage List. Several caves, including an ice cave and one festooned with aragonite crystals
Alabaster Caverns	United States	Located in the Alabaster Caverns State Park, Oklahoma. Formed in gypsum alabaster
Aven d'Orgnac	France	Located near Orgnac-l'Aven. Highly decorated chambers
Batu Caves	Malaysia	Located near Kuala Lumpur. A cave complex in a mogote, which contains a Hindu temple
Bears' Cave	Romania	Located in Chişcău village, Bihor County. Renowned for its cave bear skeletons
Blanchard Springs Caverns	United States	Located in the Ozark–St. Francis National Forest, Arkansas. One guided route is 1.2 miles (1.9 km) long
Blue Grotto	Croatia	Located on Biševo island, Dalmatia region. A sea cave accessed by boat renowned for its blue light
Cango Caves	South Africa	Located near Oudtshoorn. South Africa's major show cave, with neolithic artefacts and paintings
Carlsbad Caverns	United States	Located in the Guadalupe Mountains, New Mexico. On the Subterranean World Heritage List
Craighead Caverns	United States	Located in Tennessee. Includes a 4.5 acres (1.8 ha) lake
Deer Cave	Malaysia	Located near Miri, Sarawak. With a huge passage up to 169 metres (554 ft) wide, and 125 metres (410 ft) high
Dobšiná Ice Cave	Slovakia	Located near Dobšiná. An ice cave on the UNESCO World Heritage list
Eisriesenwelt	Austria	Located near Salzburg. A major ice cave
Frasassi Caves	Italy	Located near Ancona. A major, richly-decorated show cave
Grotta Gigante	Italy	Located near Trieste. Includes a very large chamber accessed by suspended walkways
Grutas de Cacahuamilpa	Mexico	Located in the Grutas de Cacahuamilpa National Park, Guerrero. Largest show cave in Mexico
Huanglong Cave	China	Located in Zhangjiajie-Wulingyuan, Hunan. Major show cave having over a million visitors a year.
La Verna Cave	France	Located in Sainte-Engrâce. With the largest chamber in a show cave
Magura Cave	Bulgaria	Located in the Balkan Mountains near Belogradchik. Includes access to Epipaleolithic paintings
Mammoth Cave	United States	Located in Kentucky. The world's longest cave system. On the Subterranean World Heritage List
Manjanggul	South Korea	Located on Jeju Island. A lava cave on the UNESCO World Heritage list
Phong Nha Cave	Vietnam	Located near Quang Binh. UNESCO World Heritage Site
Postojna Cave	Slovenia	Located near Postojna. The longest show cave in Europe and the birthplace of speleobiology; with small trains and concerts
Viento Cave (Cueva del Viento)	Spain	Located on Tenerife, Canary Islands. The largest lava tube system in Europe
Waitomo Glowworm Cave	New Zealand	Located in the Waitomo District, North Island. Famous for its glow worms

== See also ==
- List of caves
- List of show caves in Germany
- Show mine
