= Boga (river) =

- Location within Romania

Location
- Country: Romania
- Counties: Bihor County

Physical characteristics
- Source: Bihor Mountains
  - coordinates: 46°36′22″N 22°41′23″E
  - elevation: 1,153 m (3,783 ft)
- Mouth: Crișul Pietros
  - coordinates: 46°35′21″N 22°37′56″E
  - elevation: 448 m (1,470 ft)
- Length: 8 km (5.0 mi)
- Basin size: 38 km^{2} (15 sq mi)

Basin features
- Progression: Crișul Pietros→ Crișul Negru→ Körös→ Tisza→ Danube→ Black Sea

The Boga is a right tributary of the river Crișul Pietros in Romania. It flows into the Crișul Pietros near the village Boga. Its length is 8 km (5.0 mi) and its basin size is 38 km^{2} (15 sq mi).
