= Valea Mare Cărpinoasa =

- Location within Romania

Location
- Country: Romania
- Counties: Bihor County

Physical characteristics
- Source: Bihor Mountains
- Mouth: Crișul Pietros
  - location: Upstream of Pietroasa
  - coordinates: 46°35′24″N 22°34′52″E
  - elevation: 357 m (1,171 ft)
- Length: 12 km (7.5 mi)
- Basin size: 40 km^{2} (15 sq mi)

Basin features
- Progression: Crișul Pietros→ Crișul Negru→ Körös→ Tisza→ Danube→ Black Sea
- Tributaries
  - left: Valea Aleului, Sebișel

The Valea Mare Cărpinoasa is a right tributary of the river Crișul Pietros in Romania. It flows into the Crișul Pietros near Pietroasa. Its length is 12 km (7.5 mi) and its basin size is 40 km^{2} (15 sq mi).
