= Inaru =

- Location within Romania

Location
- Country: Romania
- Counties: Bihor County
- Villages: Ferice, Săud

Physical characteristics
- Source
  - coordinates: 46°38′33″N 22°33′30″E
  - elevation: 858 m (2,815 ft)
- Mouth: Crișul Pietros
  - location: Săud
  - coordinates: 46°36′52″N 22°29′25″E
  - elevation: 255 m (837 ft)
- Length: 9 km (5.6 mi)
- Basin size: 16 km^{2} (6.2 sq mi)

Basin features
- Progression: Crișul Pietros→ Crișul Negru→ Körös→ Tisza→ Danube→ Black Sea

The Inaru is a right tributary of the river Crișul Pietros in Romania. It flows into the Crișul Pietros in Săud. Its length is 9 km (5.6 mi) and its basin size is 16 km^{2} (6.2 sq mi).
