= List of sister cities in North Carolina =

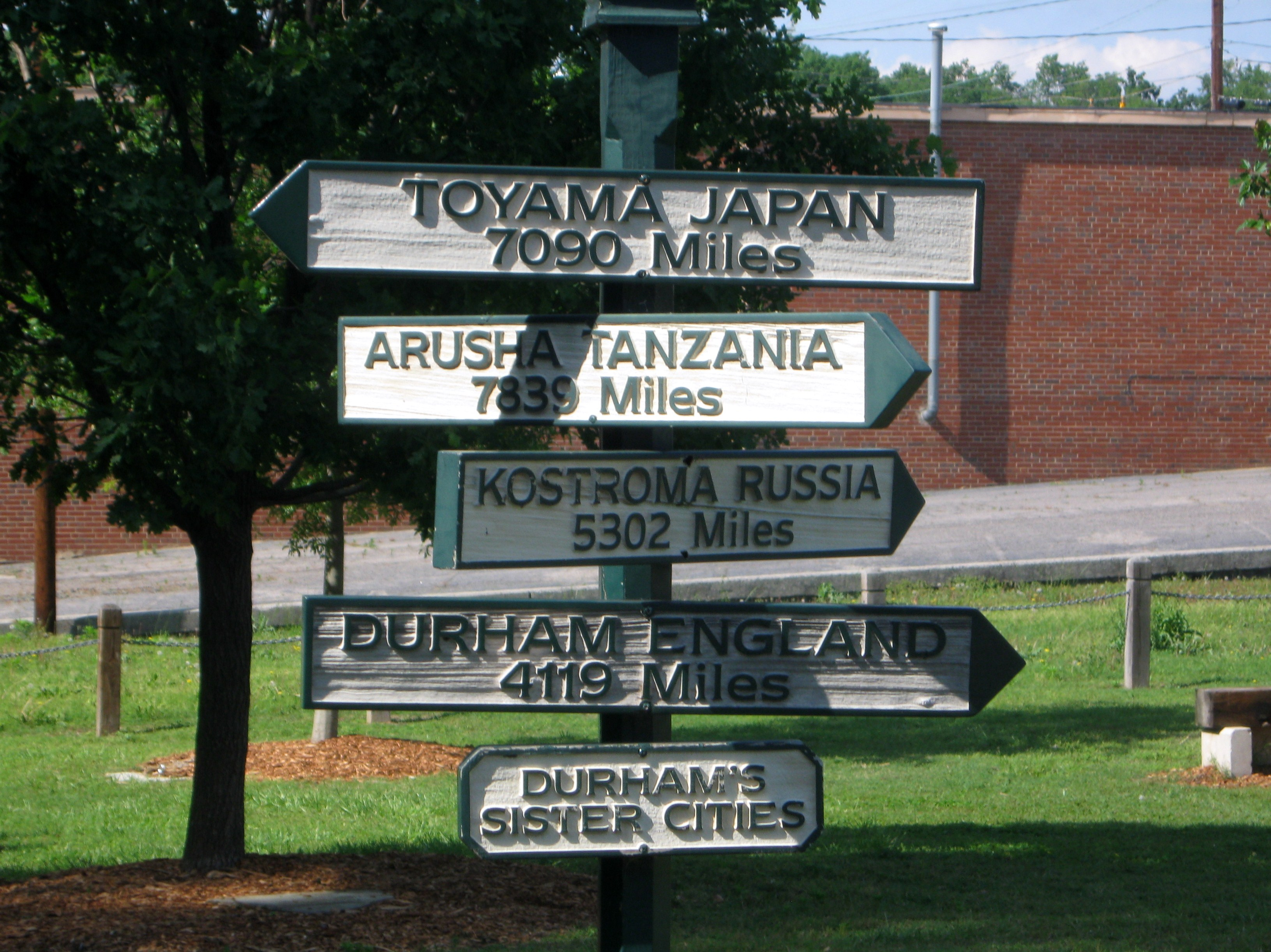
Durham's sister cities sign in 2011

This is a list of sister cities in the United States state of North Carolina. Sister cities, known in Europe as twin towns, are cities which partner with each other to promote human contact and cultural links, although this partnering is not limited to cities and often includes counties, regions, states and other sub-national entities.

Many North Carolina jurisdictions work with foreign cities through Sister Cities International, an organization whose goal is to "promote peace through mutual respect, understanding, and cooperation."

== A ==
Asheville

- Birnam, Scotland, United Kingdom
- Dunkeld, Scotland, United Kingdom
- Karpenisi, Greece
- Osogbo, Nigeria
- San Cristóbal de las Casas, Mexico
- Valladolid, Mexico
- Vladikavkaz, Russia

== B ==
Beaufort

- Beaufort, Malaysia

Boone

- Collingwood, Canada

Brevard

- Pietroasa, Romania

Burlington

- Gwacheon, South Korea
- Soledad de Graciano Sánchez, Mexico

== C ==
Cary

- Bandırma, Turkey
- Hsinchu, Taiwan
- Markham, Canada
- (Republic of Ireland) County Meath, Ireland
- Le Touquet-Paris-Plage, France

Chapel Hill

- Puerto Baquerizo Moreno, Ecuador

Charlotte

- Arequipa, Peru
- Baoding, China
- Krefeld, Germany
- Kumasi, Ghana
- Limoges, France
- Wrocław, Poland

Concord

- (The Bahamas) Freeport, Bahamas
- (Republic of Ireland) Killarney, Ireland
- Siena, Italy

== D ==
Durham

- Arusha, Tanzania
- Celaya, Mexico
- Durham, England, United Kingdom
- Kavala, Greece
- Kunshan, China
- Sibiu, Romania
- Tilarán, Costa Rica
- Toyama, Japan
- Zhuzhou, China

== F ==
Fayetteville

- Saint-Avold, France

== G ==
Gastonia

- Gotha, Germany
- Santiago de Surco (Lima), Peru

Greensboro

- Buiucani (Chișinău), Moldova
- Yingkou, China

Greenville

- Yeonsu (Incheon), South Korea

== H ==
Hendersonville

- Almuñécar, Spain
- Pallanza (Verbania), Italy

Hickory

- Altenburger Land (district), Germany

== K ==
Kitty Hawk

- Coulaines, France

== L ==
Laurinburg

- Oban, Scotland, United Kingdom

== M ==
Manteo

- Bideford, England, United Kingdom

Matthews

- Sainte-Maxime, France

Mooresville

- Hockenheim, Germany

Mount Airy

- Samut Songkhram, Thailand

== R ==
Raleigh

- Compiègne, France
- Gibraltar
- Kingston upon Hull, England, United Kingdom
- Nairobi, Kenya
- Rostock, Germany

== S ==
Saluda

- Carunchio, Italy

Salisbury

- Salisbury, England, United Kingdom

Sanford

- Atizapán de Zaragoza, Mexico
- Yixing, China

Southern Pines

- Newry, Mourne and Down, Northern Ireland, United Kingdom

== V ==
Valdese

- Torre Pellice, Italy

== W ==
Wilmington

- Bridgetown, Barbados
- Dandong, China
- Doncaster, England, United Kingdom
- San Pedro, Belize

Winston-Salem

- Buchanan, Liberia
- (The Bahamas) Freeport, Bahamas
- Kumasi, Ghana
- (The Bahamas) Nassau, Bahamas
- Ungheni, Moldova
- Yangpu (Shanghai), China
