= Leurda =

Leurda ("ramsons") may refer to several villages in Romania:

- Leurda, a village in Cășeiu Commune, Cluj County
- Leurda, a village in the town of Motru, Gorj County
- Valea Leurdei, a tributary of the Crișul Pietros in Bihor County
