= Crișul Pietros =

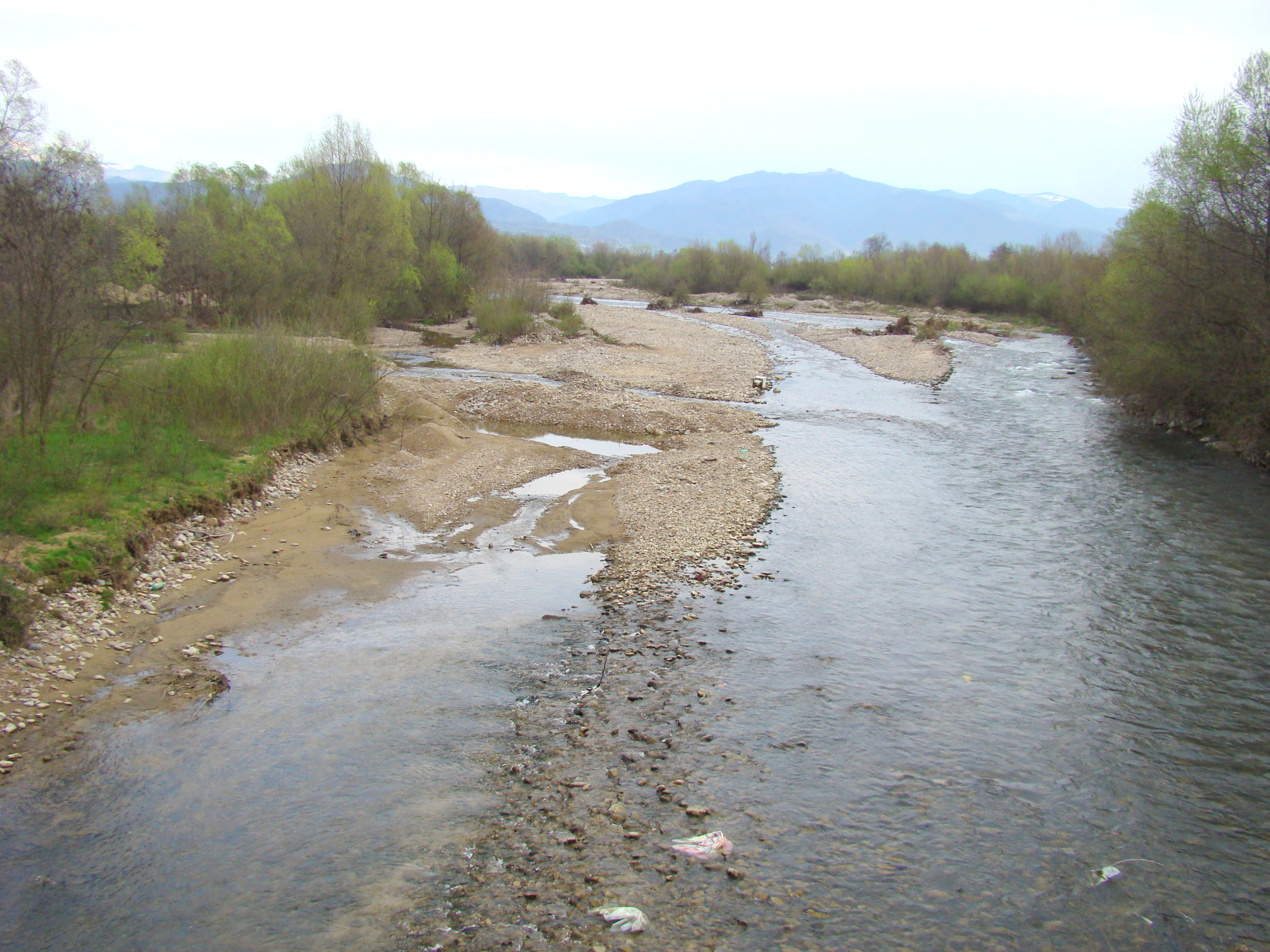
- Crișul Pietros at Săud, Bihor county

- Location within Romania

Location
- Country: Romania
- Counties: Bihor County
- Villages: Pietroasa, Poienii de Jos, Buntești

Physical characteristics
- Source: Bihor Mountains
- Mouth: Crișul Negru
  - location: Drăgănești
  - coordinates: 46°37′25″N 22°22′41″E
  - elevation: 194 m (636 ft)
- Length: 31 km (19 mi)
- Basin size: 226 km^{2} (87 sq mi)

Basin features
- Progression: Crișul Negru→ Körös→ Tisza→ Danube→ Black Sea

The Crișul Pietros (Romanian for: "stony Criș") is a right tributary of the river Crișul Negru in Romania. Upstream from its confluence with the Boga it is called Valea Galbena. Its length is 31 km (19 mi) and its basin size is 226 km^{2} (87 sq mi). It discharges into the Crișul Negru in Drăgănești.

== Tributaries ==
The following rivers are tributaries to the Crișul Pietros:

- Left: Lazu
- Right: Boga, Valea Mare Cărpinoasa, Runc, Inaru, Valea Leurdei
