= Bears' Cave =

Cave in Romania

- Peștera Urșilor
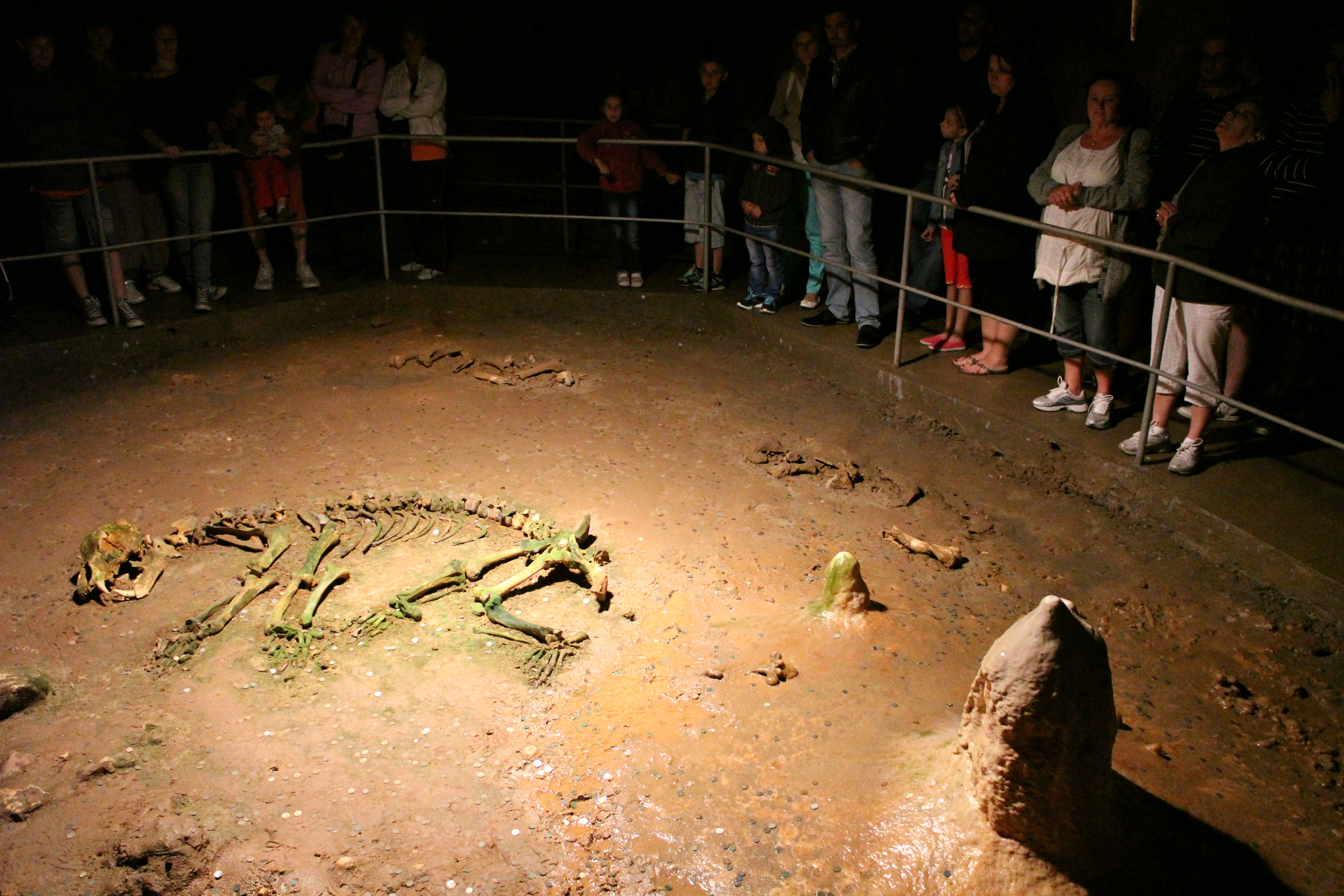
- Skeleton of a cave bear (Ursus spelaeus) in the Bones Hall

- Location within Romania
- Location: Chișcău, Bihor County, Romania
- Coordinates: 46°33′14″N 22°34′09″E
- Depth: 482 m (1,581 ft)
- Length: 1.5 km (4,900 ft)
- Discovery: 1975
- Geology: limestone
- Entrances: 1
- Access: Tuesday to Sunday, 10:00–17:00.

Bears' Cave (Romanian: Peștera Urșilor, Hungarian: Medve-barlang) is located in the western Apuseni Mountains, on the outskirts of Chișcău village, Bihor County, northwestern Romania. It was discovered in 1975 by Speodava, an amateur spelaeologist group.

Bears' Cave received its name after the 140 cave bear skeletons which were discovered on the site in 1983. The cave bear, also known as Ursus spelaeus, is a species of bear which became extinct during the Last Glacial Maximum, about 27,500 years ago.

The cave has three galleries and four halls: The Candles Hall, Emil Racoviță Hall, The Spaghetti Hall and The Bones Hall.

== History ==
The name of the cave is due to the numerous fossils of "cave bears" (Ursus spelaeus) found here. The cave used to be a home for these animals 15,000 years ago.

The cave remained closed until 17 September 1975, when the underground void was artificially opened by dynamiting the entrance during the limestone (marble) quarrying works. Traian Curta, a miner from Chișcău, went down the shaft for the first time. He went through the access gallery to the Great Hall.

The first exploration of the cave took place on 20 September 1975 by the group of amateur cavers "Speodava" from the town of Dr. Petru Groza (now the town of Ștei). On the basis of complex studies carried out by the Institute of Speleology "Emil Racoviță" in collaboration with the Criș Country Museum in Oradea, the solutions for the layout and specific protection measures were established. After 5 years of development, the cave was opened to visitors on 14 July 1980. Every year the cave is visited by more than 200,000 tourists.

== Gallery ==
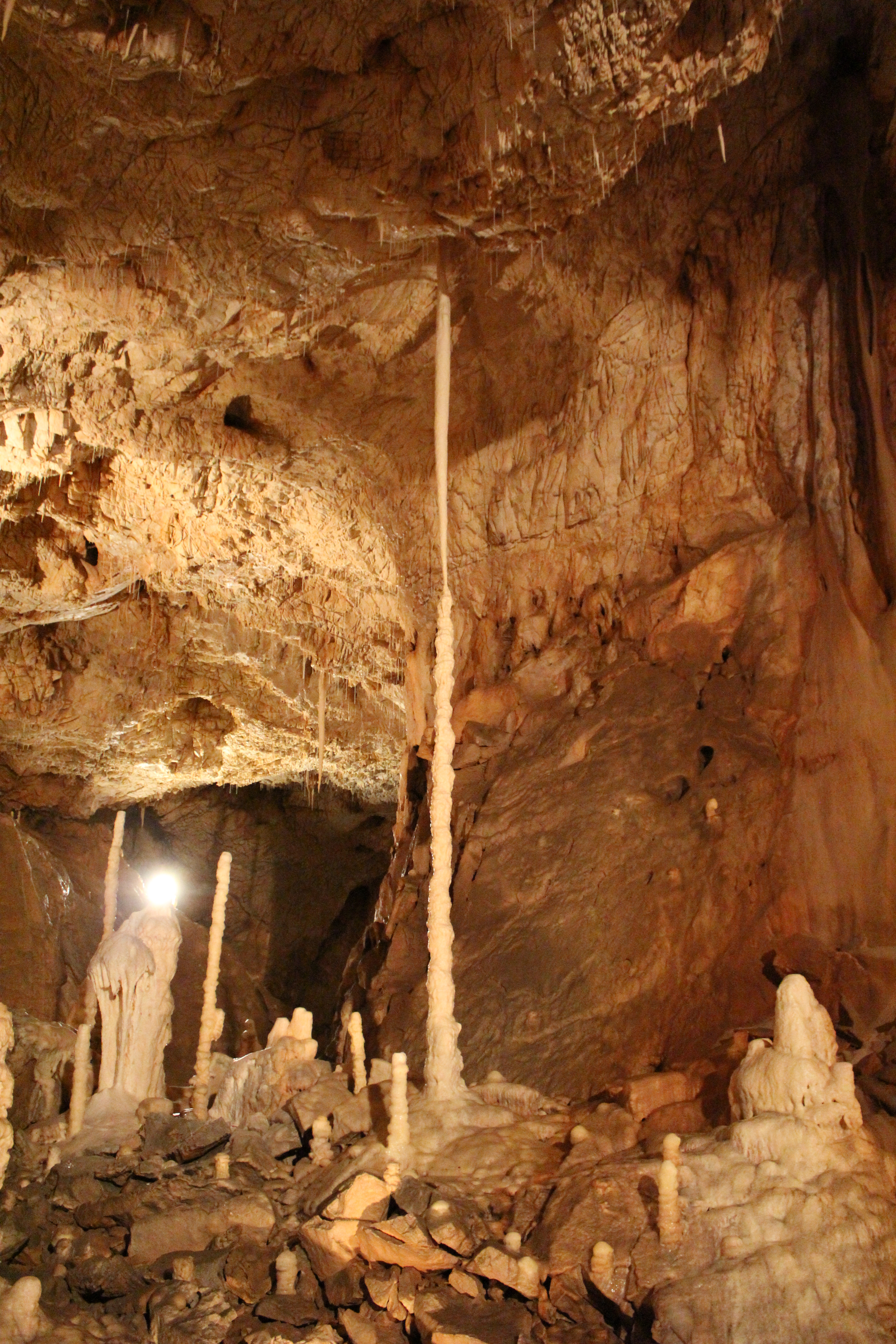
Pillar of dripstone

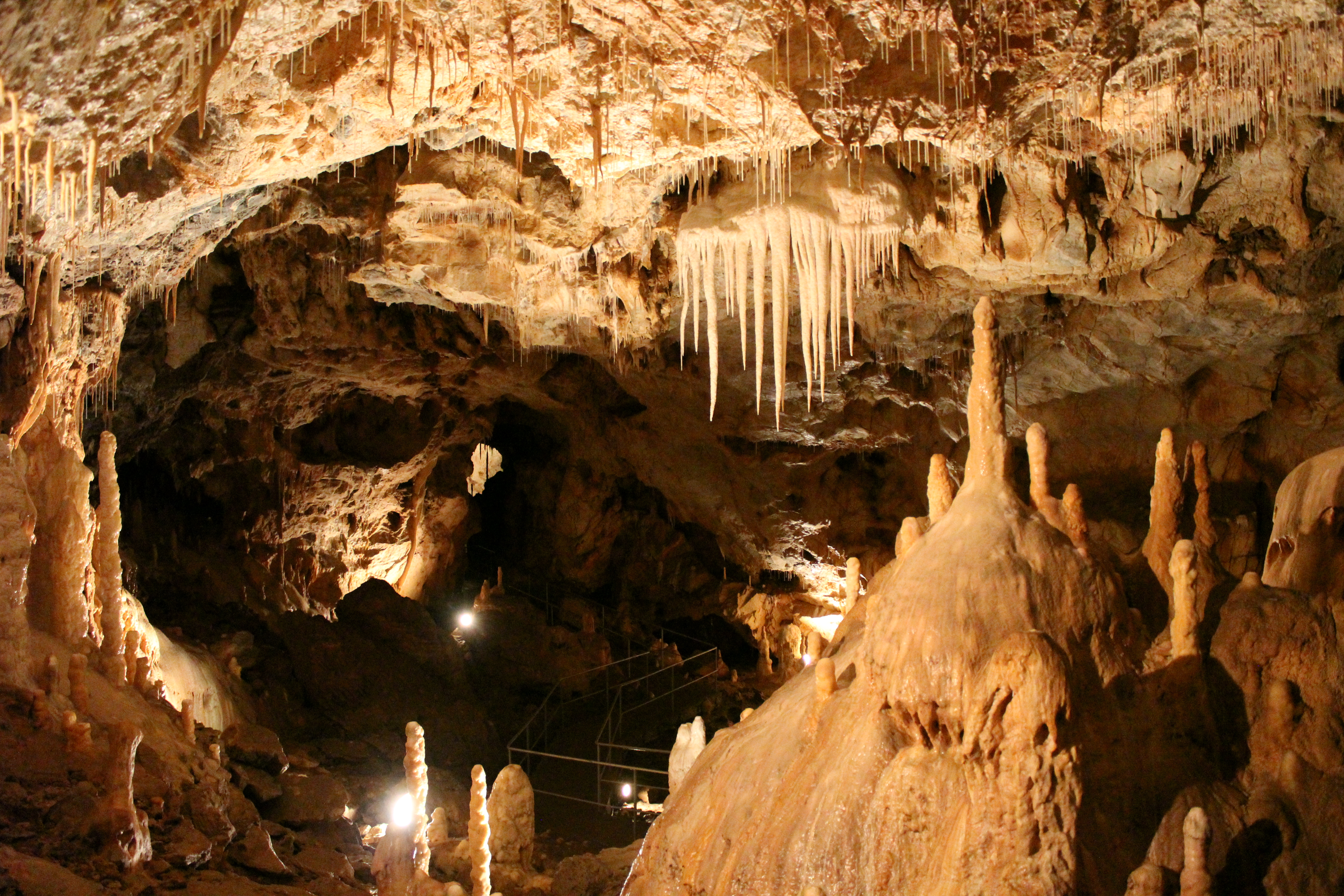
Interior of the cave

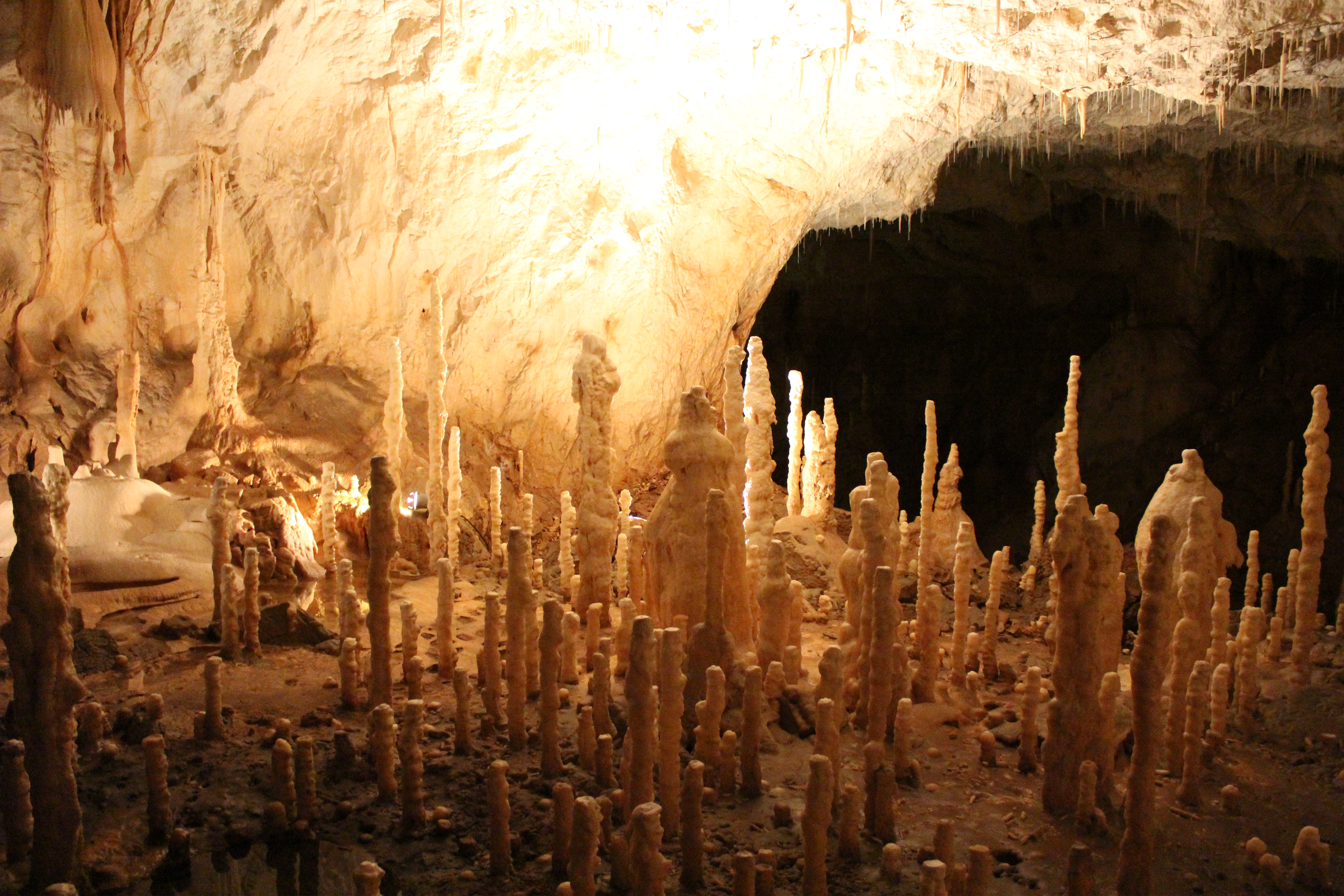
Stalactites and stalagmites

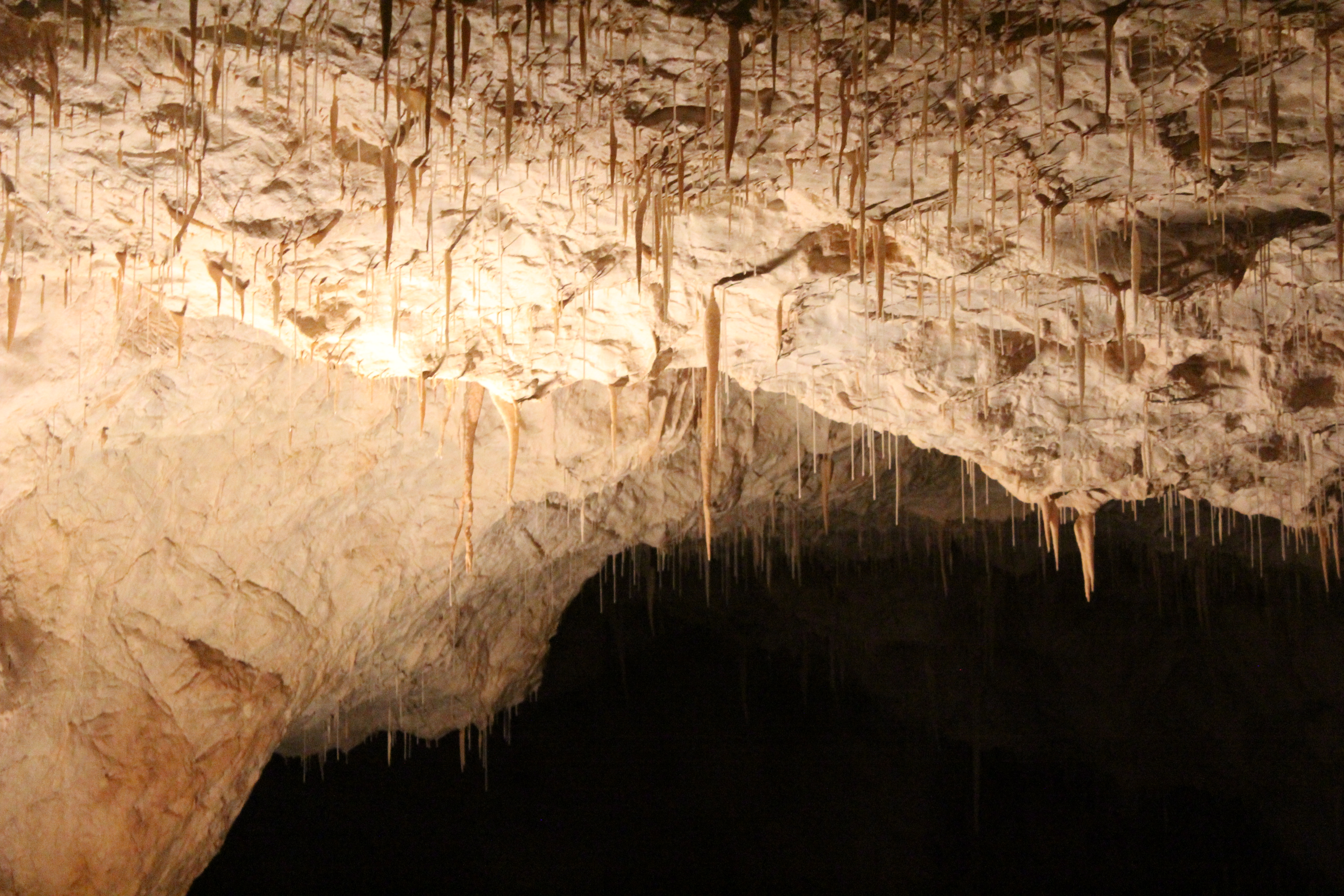
Stalactites
