= Orgnac-l'Aven =

- Commune
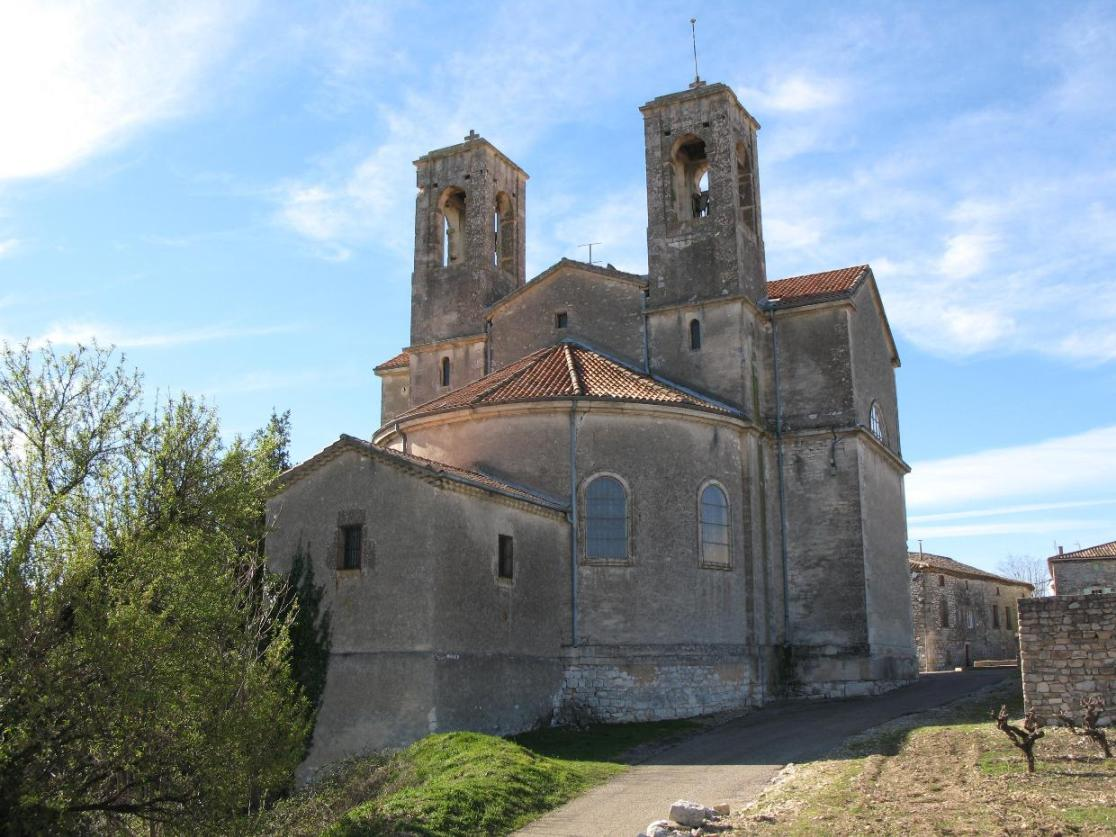
- The church in Orgnac

- Coat of arms
- Location of Orgnac-l'Aven
- Location within France Location within Auvergne-Rhône-Alpes
- Coordinates: 44°18′25″N 4°26′03″E
- Country: France
- Region: Auvergne-Rhône-Alpes
- Department: Ardèche
- Arrondissement: Largentière
- Canton: Vallon-Pont-d'Arc

Government
  - Mayor (2020–2026): René Ughetto
- Area^{1}: 21.84 km^{2} (8.43 sq mi)
- Elevation: 300 m (980 ft)
- Highest elevation: 388 m (1,273 ft)
- Lowest elevation: 140 m (460 ft)
- Population (2023): 575
  - Density: 26.3/km^{2} (68.2/sq mi)
- Time zone: UTC+01:00 (CET)
  - Summer (DST): UTC+02:00 (CEST)
- INSEE/Postal code: 07168 /07150
- ^{1} French Land Register data, which excludes lakes, ponds, glaciers > 1 km^{2} (0.386 sq mi or 247 acres) and river estuaries.

Orgnac-l'Aven (French pronunciation: [ɔʁɲak lavɛn]; Occitan: Ornhac de l'Avenc) is a commune in the Ardèche department in southern France.

The Aven d'Orgnac cave is located near the village.

== Population ==
Historical population
Year	Pop.	±% p.a.
1968	281	—
1975	297	+0.79%
1982	323	+1.21%
1990	327	+0.15%
1999	341	+0.47%
2007	509	+5.13%
2012	551	+1.60%
2017	585	+1.20%
2023	575	−0.29%
Source: INSEE

== See also ==
- Côtes du Vivarais AOC
- Communes of the Ardèche department
