= Aven d'Orgnac =

Cave in France

Coordinates: 44°19′12″N 4°24′43″E

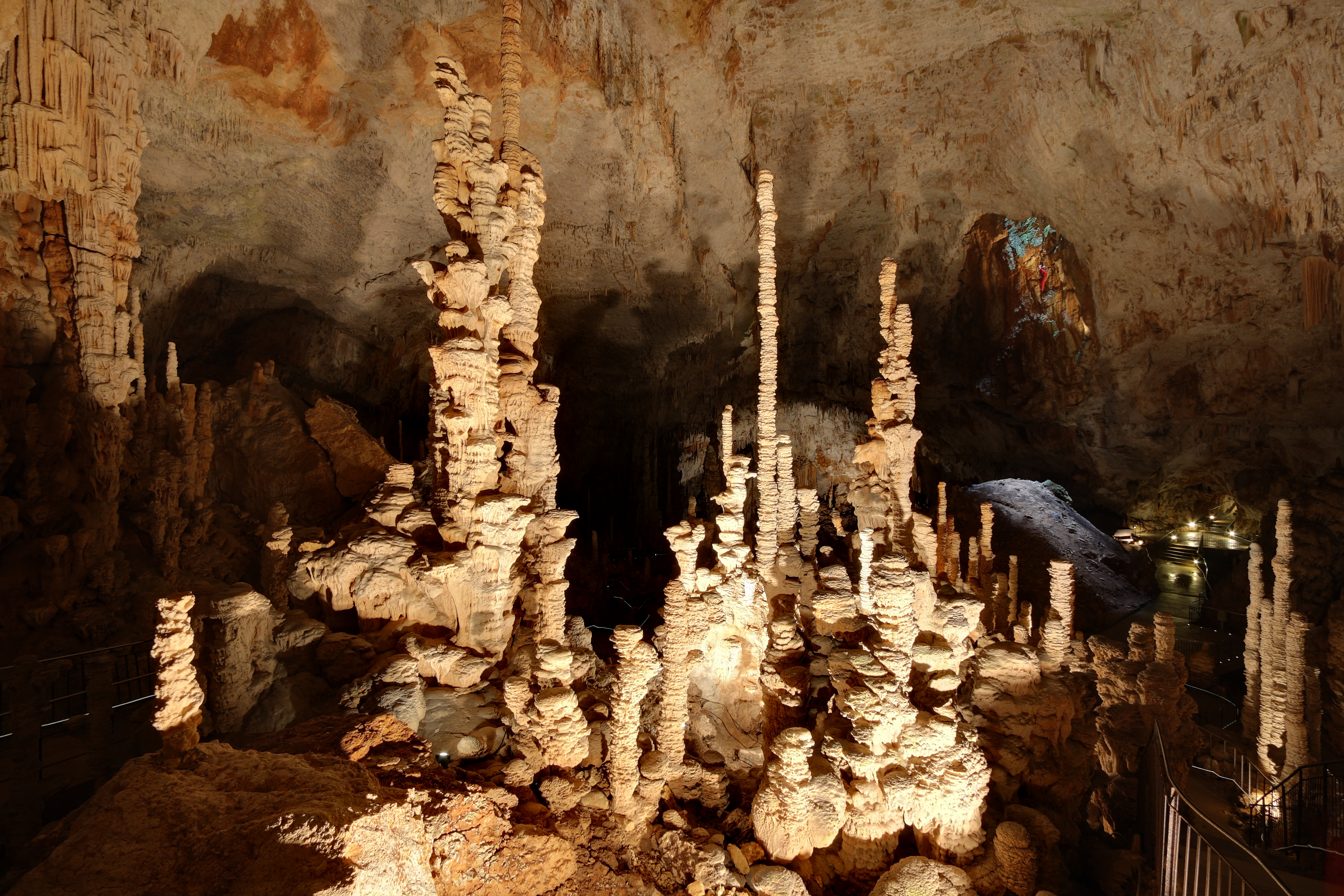
- Interactive map of Aven d'Orgnac
- Website: https://www.orgnac.com/

The aven d'Orgnac is a cave located to the south of the limestone plateau of the Gorges de l'Ardèche, in the commune of Orgnac-l'Aven in the department of Ardèche, in the region Auvergne-Rhône-Alpes, and Issirac in the Gard department, in the Occitanie region.

Remarkable for the very large volumes of its rooms and its varied Concretions, it was destined for tourism and is now classified a Grand Site de France.

The archaeological site of Orgnac III, occupied since the final Acheulean, is one of the oldest known archaeological sites to have yielded lithic industry using the Levallois technique.

== Location ==
The Orgnac sinkhole is dug into the Ronze wood massif; it is located 2.3 km northwest of the small town of Orgnac-l'Aven in the Ardèche department, on the north side of the road D176 leading to Barjac in the Gard department on the route of the long-distance hiking trail GR 4B. The trail connects Royan (Charente-Maritime to Grasse (Alpes-Maritimes), from the Atlantic to the Mediterranean.

== History ==
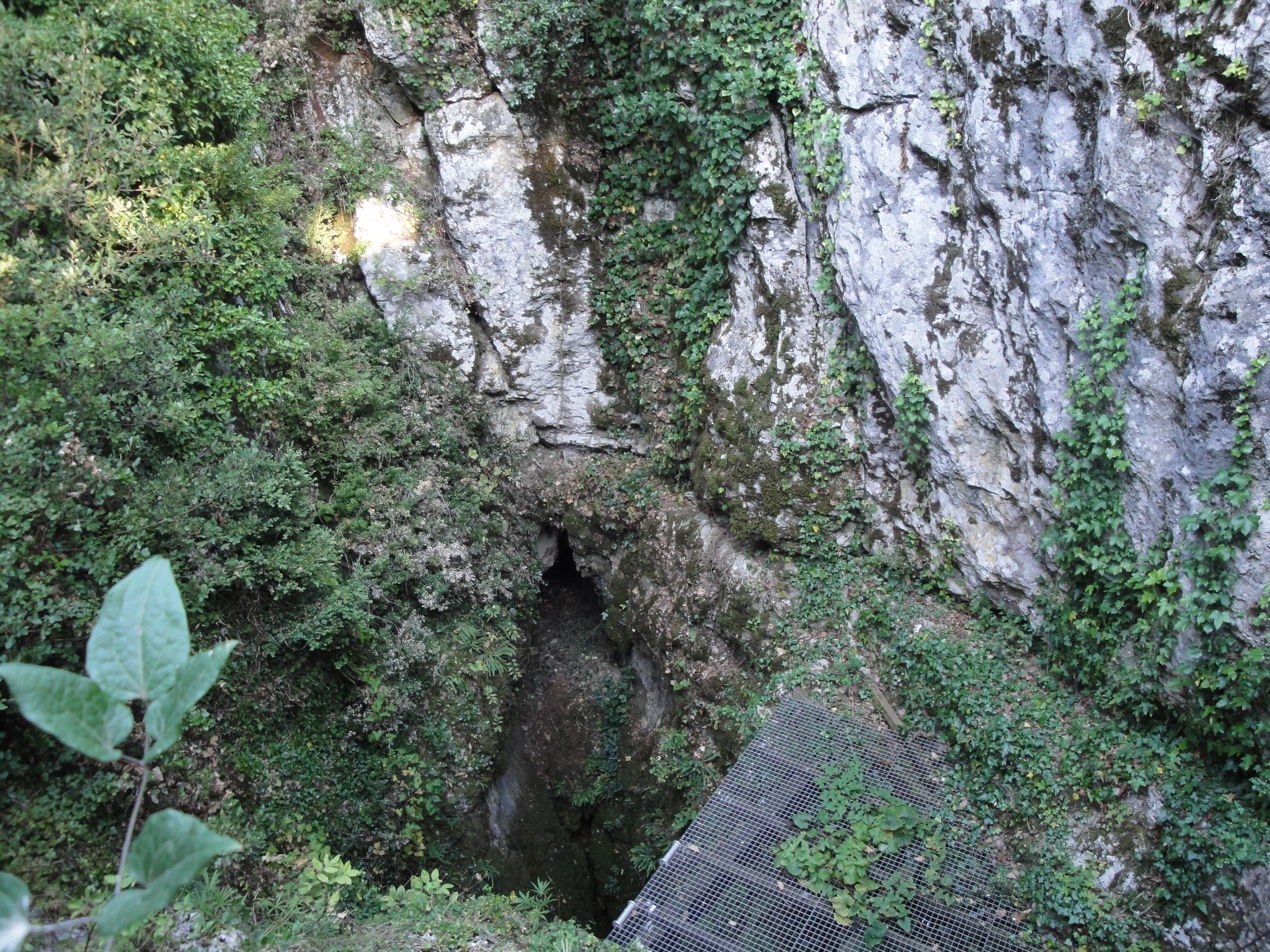
Entrée naturel de l'aven.

=== The discovery and its context ===
The statutes of the Caving Club of France are created in 1929 by Robert de Joly. He travels the French karst terrains for this purpose, where he is looking for “a new aven Armand” He returned to the Ardèche gorges area in 1935. The villagers of Orgnac, local hunters and shepherds, know of the existence near their village of a chasm, which they call "the Bertras sinkhole". On 19 August 1935, led to the Bertras sinkhole by the villagers, five speleologists descended into it: Joly, Latour, Abbé Glory, Petit and Chagnard. They explore it to the bottom of the Red rooms. This first expedition lasts 10 hours.

=== Tourism development ===
The tourist aspect, with the concern for development in the foreground, is highlighted from the first official exploration, which is remarkably rapid in this area. This is due to three main factors: Joly's dynamic, even dominant personality, and his enthusiasm for the cave, the beauty of this cave, and the fact that once developed it was at the time the only cave that could be visited in the lower Vivarais area (as the Ardeche is still called). The closest developed cave is the grotte des Demoiselles in the Hérault department, more than 90 km southwest of Orgnac, and the aven Armand which is 130 km to the west.

Upon returning to the surface, Joly had three municipal councilors sign a report attesting to the authenticity of the exploration of the sinkhole “where, to our knowledge, they were the first to have descended”. Then, he informed the municipality of Orgnac of the discovery, they are the owner of the cavity since it will be developed under municipal land. He had tourist development in mind, and the very evening of the meeting, he wrote a letter to Mayor Paul Delarque emphasizing the qualities of the cave, with capitals and emphatic quotation marks:

““A discovery like “BERTAS” is UNIQUE in the life of an underground explorer”, and flattering comparisons: “M. É.-A. MARTEL had in his life the aven “ARMAND”, PADIRAC being little compared. Mr. A. Viré had St. SOL LACAVE. Without fear of being wrong, "BERTAS" is even better, because more varied...

Very quickly after the discovery, Joly took out a lease on the land concerned - which demonstrates his faith in the future tourism of the cave.

The mayor is receptive to Joly's enthusiasm. The municipal council meeting on 9 February 1936 voted for a credit of 1,200 francs for the development work on the sinkhole, where it was decided to build an access road and dig a tunnel for access. The municipal council meeting of 1 November 1936 notes that "the Mayor and some councilors insisted on visiting the Armand sinkhole and realized that the Orgnac sinkhole presented great tourist interest." At that time, Aven Armand already had 27,000 visitors per year.

Two years were spent studying, seeking grants from the High Commission for Tourism, obtaining a loan. The municipality declared in February 1937 that it would exploit the sinkhole itself. Work began in the fall of 1938 with the access tunnel, the interior path and electric lighting. De Joly was appointed operations director of Aven on December 17, 1938

On July 11, 1939, there was the inauguration in the presence of the Minister of Agriculture and several parliamentarians. The aven welcomes 14 379 visitors in August, 7,243 all that summer. The pace drops notably during the Second World War but picks up again at the end of hostilities. De Joly strives to make people talk about the cave, which is cited in a number of newspapers, put into poems, songs and "stories in the rose water ". Towards the end of the forties, he even speaks of a hotel-restaurant “at the top of the hill, near the sinkhole”. Noises swirling around a potential housing development nearby. De Joly talks about the future developments of the lower parts and the side rooms. In reality, only a reception building was inaugurated in 1948, then an elevator installed in 1965 from the Joly room. The threshold of 100,000 annual visitors was reached in 1966.

The 1960s also saw the crossing of the cat flap at the back of the North room, Orgnac II, III and IV were discovered in 1965 and 1966: the network was multiplied by five. Disagreements, prohibitions and 20 years of research sacrificed

Despite and because of this brilliant discovery, the climate of the years 1965-1975 (and longer) turned into a storm between the town hall and the discoverers; and the latter find support in the neighboring commune of Issirac, which owns land covering the newly discovered networks. The Orgnac town hall would like to stop the explorations. And the logic of tourist development would require a second access to be opened, to the new rooms - access which could be independent of that of Orgnac. Unique in the history of speleological explorations, the authorities were mobilized with a visit to the new networks organized on 3 August 1965, two days after the discovery, for around forty people including the sub-prefect, the municipal council and the press, and another visit to the same networks on 12 September 1975 for the Secretary of State for Tourism and the Prefect of the Ardèche.

The independent development projects by Issirac were finally abandoned in 1976 and an agreement to this effect was signed in 1978: Issirac renounced any unilateral undertaking and would receive a compensatory percentage on the revenues from the Aven d'Orgnac, less the revenues from the cave of La Forestièren 2. All this bustle around the cave has not harmed its tourist attendance, on the contrary: in 1971, Jean Trébuchon wrote that this increased after the discoveries of the years 1965-1966.

The signing of this agreement does not, however, put an end to the visit veto by the municipality of Orgnac. She can impose it, and she does. The research stopped towards the end of the 1960s. De Joly died in 1968; however, when in 1966 Jean-Claude Duplessy wanted to obtain a concretion to study it, it was not to the municipality that he addressed this, but to Joly who thought that the scientific investigation would increase the reputation of the sinkhole. This appeal ceases with the death of the latter. Then, the only one authorized to study the cave was Philippe Renault who, mandated by the town hall seeking to thwart Issirac's projects on Orgnac IV, conducted an expertise there on 13 and 14 June 1972. Hence Yann Callot's thesis (1979) contains only three pages on Orgnac: there he admits his shortcomings regarding the cave, explaining that he was prohibited from entering the rooms outside the tourist part which “is not significant to the rest of the network”. Same thing for Éric Gilli, who does not gain access to the Plane room or the Thirteen room. Pierre Slama, who wanted to look for Diaprysius in Orgnac II, had to argue for a year and a half with the municipality of Orgnac and with René Ginet, professor of biospeleology in Lyon, before being able to enter in 1982.

This deplorable attitude only ceased with the preparation for the Grand site de France operation in the mid-1990s.

== Bibliography in French ==
- Biot, Vincent; Duval, Mélanie; Gauchon, Christophe (2007). "L'aven d'Orgnac - Identification d'un haut lieu du tourisme souterrain". L'Aven d'Orgnac - Valorisation touristique, apports scientifiques (PDF) (in French). pp. 13–35.
- Jean-Jacques Delannoy; Christophe Gauchon; Stéphane Jaillet (2007). "L'Aven d'Orgnac, valorisation touristique, apports scientifiques" (PDF). Collection Edytem. Cahiers de Géographie (in French): 185. ISSN 1762-4304..
