= Buntești =

- Commune
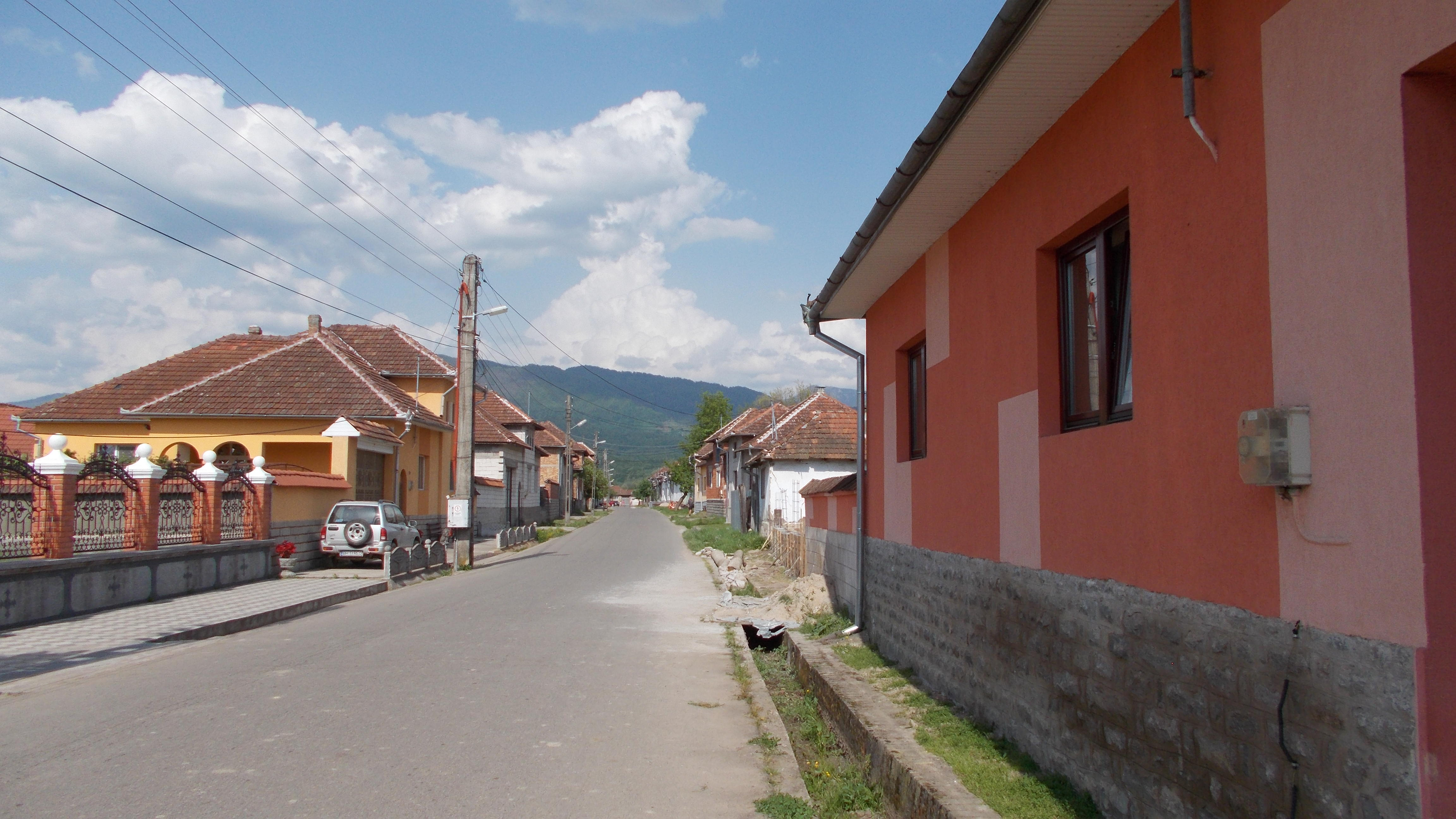
- Poienii de Sus

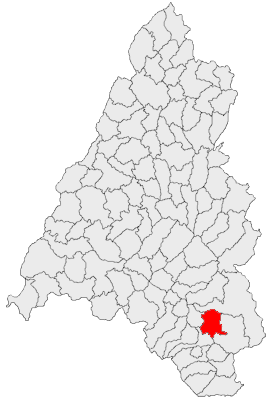
- Location in Bihor County

- Location in Romania
- Coordinates: 46°37′N 22°28′E
- Country: Romania
- County: Bihor

Government
  - Mayor (2020–2024): Sorin-Mihai Degău (PNL)
- Area: 72.19 km^{2} (27.87 sq mi)
- Population (2021-12-01): 4,090
  - Density: 56.7/km^{2} (147/sq mi)
- Time zone: UTC+02:00 (EET)
  - Summer (DST): UTC+03:00 (EEST)
- Postal code: 417115
- Area code: +40 x59
- Vehicle reg.: BH
- Website: www.comunabuntesti.ro

Buntești (Hungarian: Bontesd, German: Buntschest) is a commune in Bihor County, Crișana, Romania with a population of 4,615 people. It is composed of nine villages: Buntești, Brădet (Biharfenyves), Dumbrăvani (Dombrovány), Ferice (Fericse), Lelești (Lelesd), Poienii de Jos (Alsópojény), Poienii de Sus (Felsőpojény), Săud (Szód), and Stâncești (Kisbékafalva).

The commune is located in the southeastern part of the county, at the foot of the Apuseni Mountains. It lies on the banks of the river Crișul Pietros. The closest city is Beiuș, 12 km (7.5 mi) to the northwest.
