= Pietroasa, Bihor =

Pietroasa
- Commune
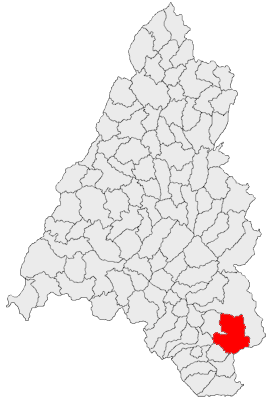
- Location in Bihor County

- Location in Romania
- Coordinates: 46°35′30″N 22°33′20″E
- Country: Romania
- County: Bihor
- Population (2021-12-01): 3,014
- Time zone: EET/EEST (UTC+2/+3)
- Vehicle reg.: BH

Pietroasa ("stony" in Romanian; Hungarian: Vasaskőfalva) is a commune in Bihor County, Crișana, Romania with a population of 3,209 people. It is composed of seven villages: Chișcău (Kiskoh), Cociuba Mică (Felsőkocsoba), Giulești (Zsulest), Gurani (Gurány), Măgura (Biharmagura), Moțești (Mocsest) and Pietroasa.

Bear Cave, a sightseeing location in the western Apuseni Mountains where 140 cave bear skeletons were found, is on the outskirts of Chișcău village.
