= Bandera Volcano Ice Cave =

Lava tube system in New Mexico

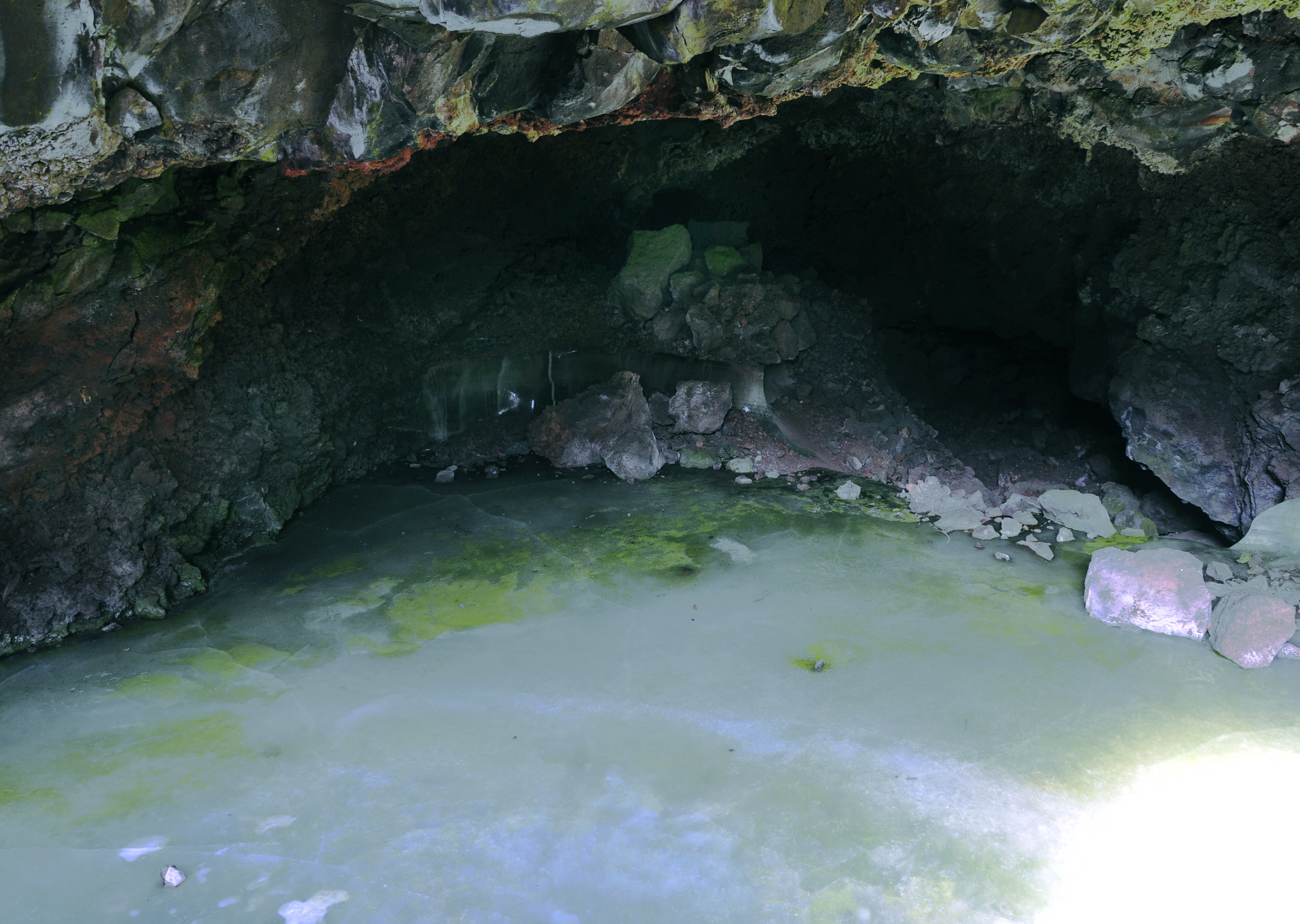
Zuni-Bandera Ice Cave)

Bandera Volcano Ice Cave, also known as Zuni Ice Cave, is a lava tube cave in New Mexico with an internal temperature significantly less than above-ground summertime ambient temperature; it contains perennial ice. The inside temperatures can fluctuate between −1 and 10 °C (31 and 50 °F). Some areas of the ice cave never reach above freezing. For years, local Indigenous people used the cave to store food.

== Geology ==
The lava tube was formed during the Bandera Crater eruption sometime between 9,500 and 10,900 years ago, during one of the many basaltic eruptions in the Zuni-Bandera volcanic field over the past million years. The crater's cinder cone is 900 feet (270 m) high, reaching 8,309 feet (2,533 m) above sea level.

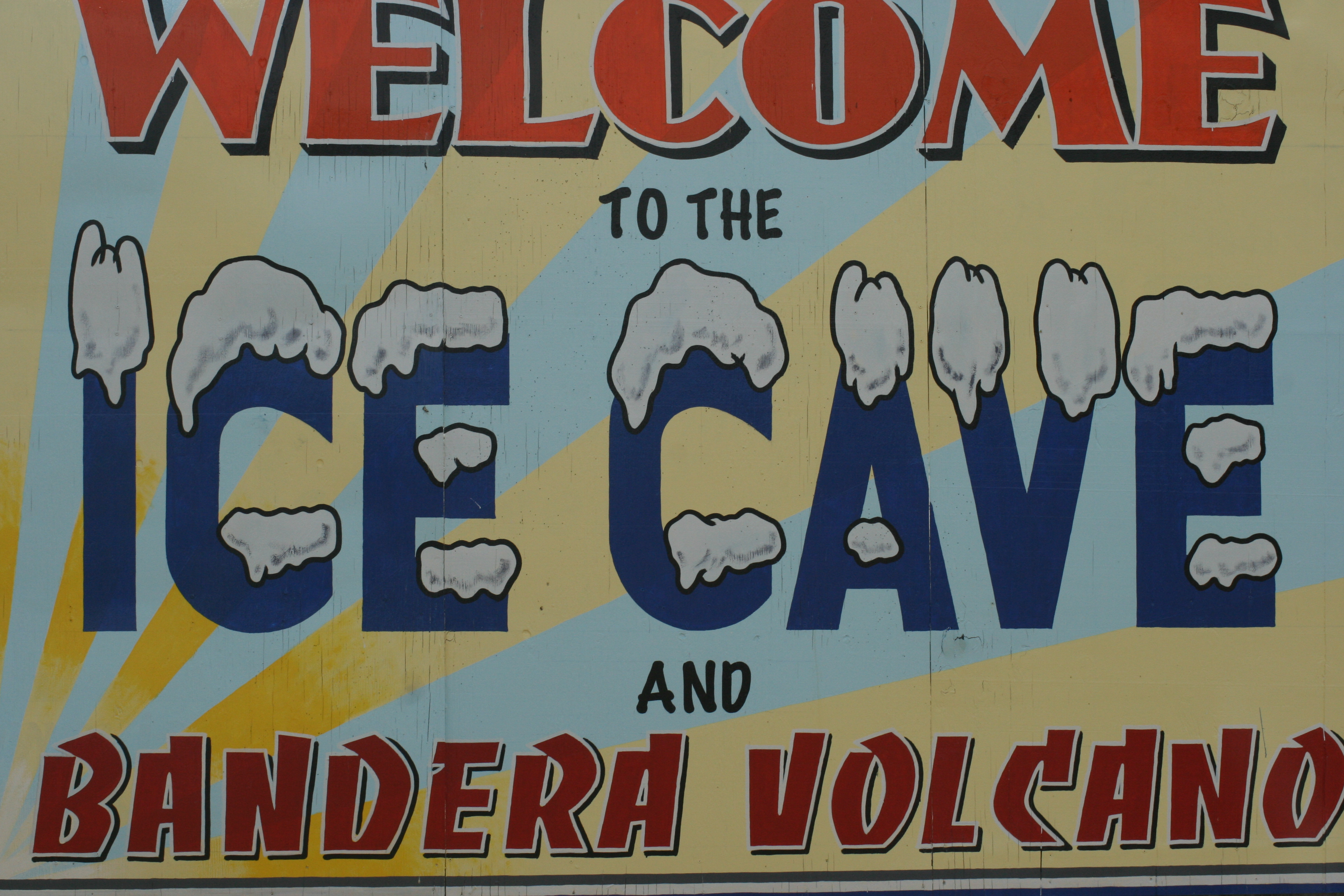
Ice Cave and Bandera Volcano

The eruption produced numerous formations in addition to lava tubes including a cinder cone, collapse pits, spatter cones and lava spine. The type of lava is ʻaʻā, which is more viscous than pāhoehoe. There are many lava tubes and several ice caves in the area including Giant Ice Cave. One has been developed as a commercial ice cave near the Candelaria Trading Post. Lava tubes in the area, "some dating back 115,000 years, formed a network of underground tubes stretching for 17 miles—the longest such system in the continental United States."

== Location ==
The cave system is located in the El Malpais lava field within the boundaries of El Malpais National Monument, located on privately owned land since the early 1900s at 34.9916°N 108.0829°W.

== Gallery ==
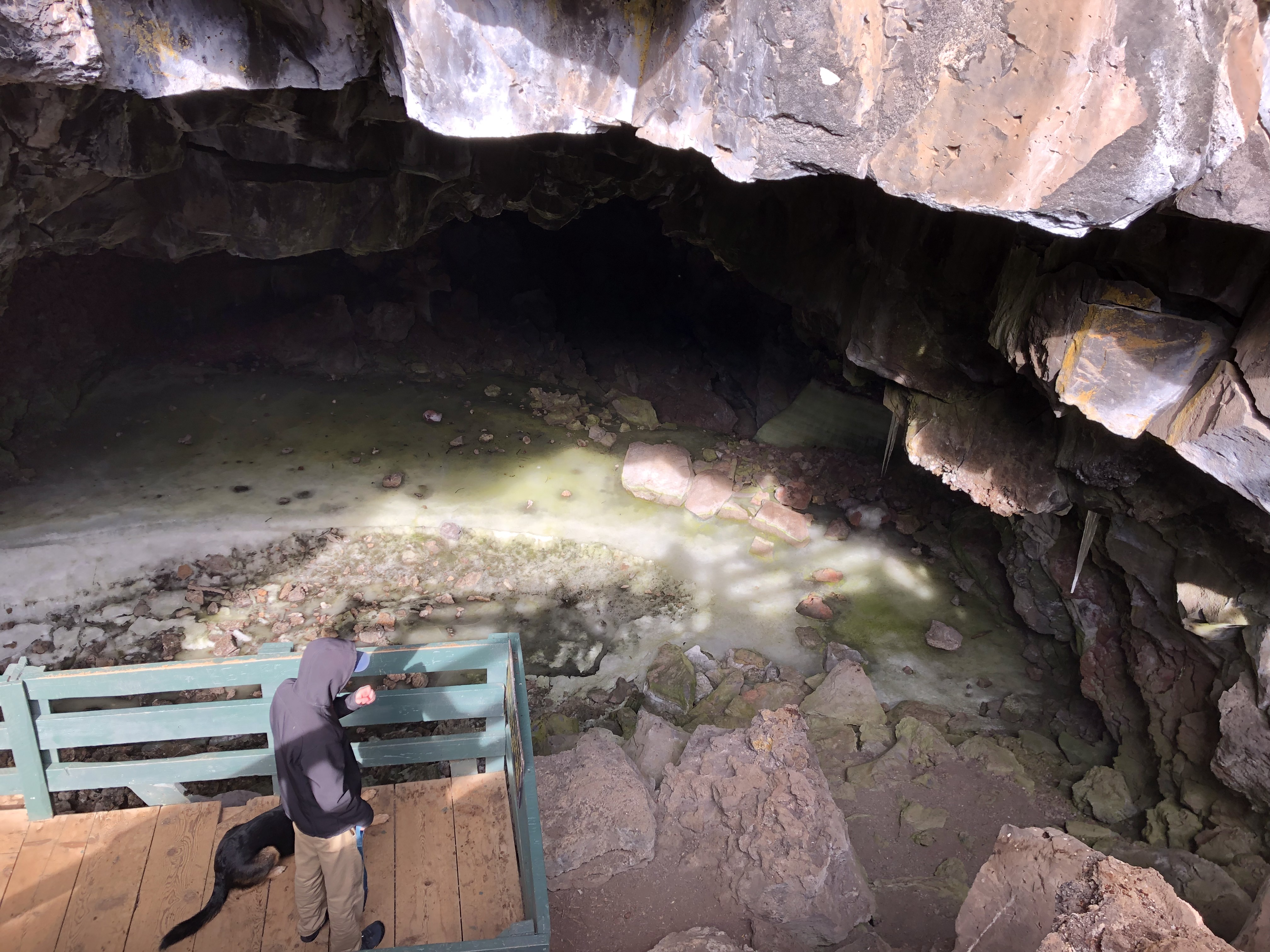
Ice Cold

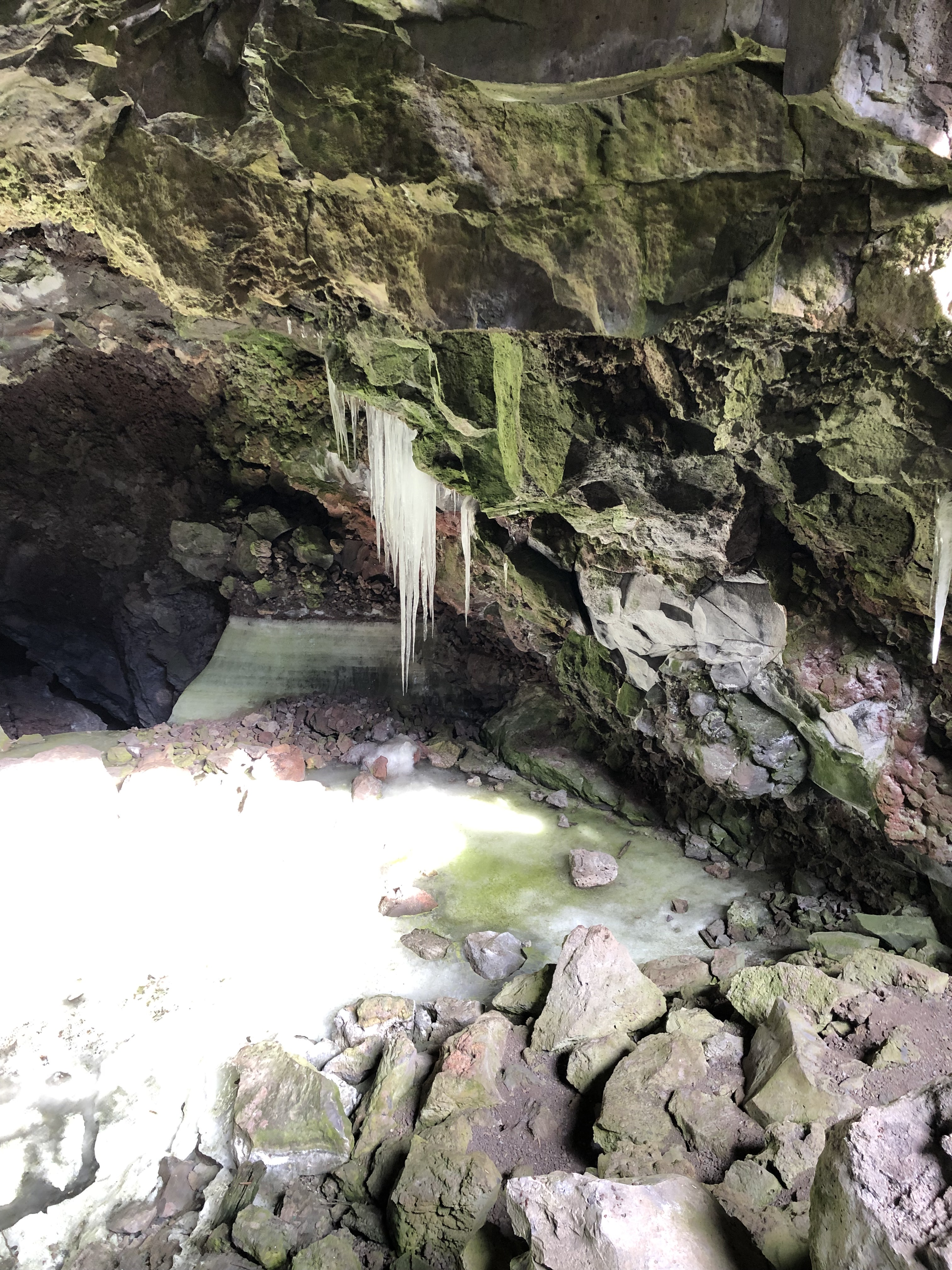
Ice Cave Icicles

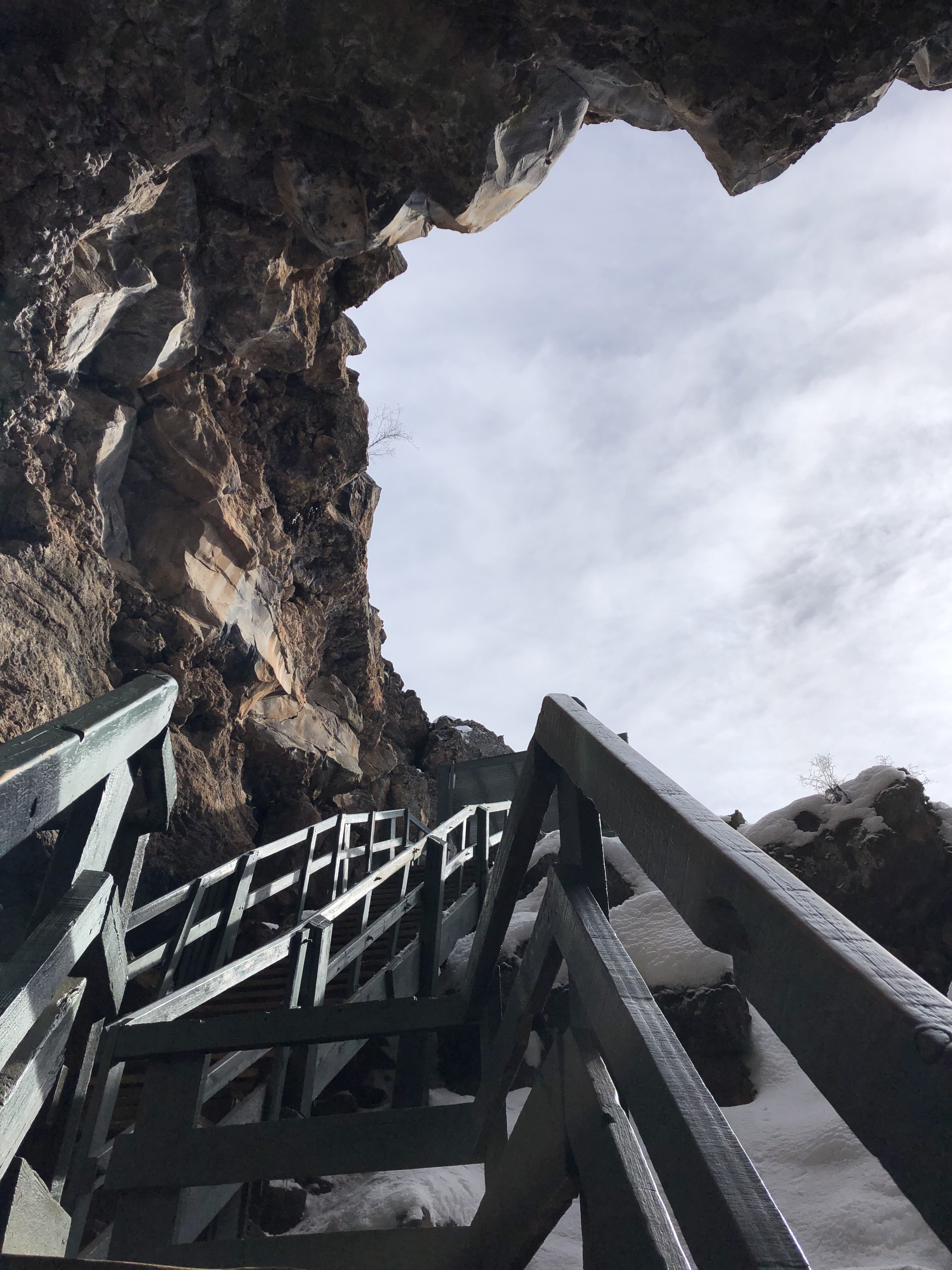
Down in the Depths

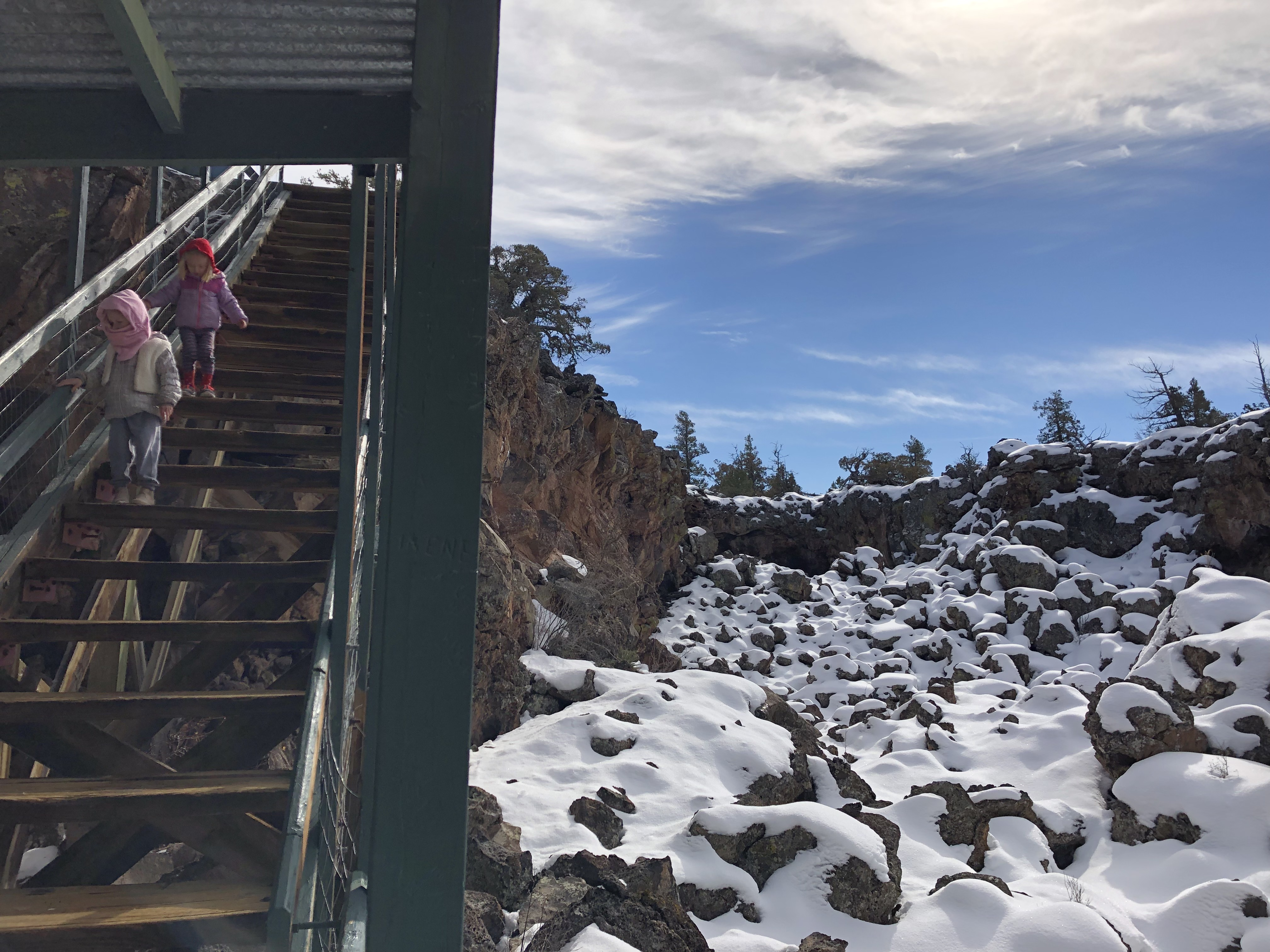
Descent into the Ice Cave
