= Zuni-Bandera volcanic field =

Volcanic field in New Mexico, United States

Zuni-Bandera Volcanic Field
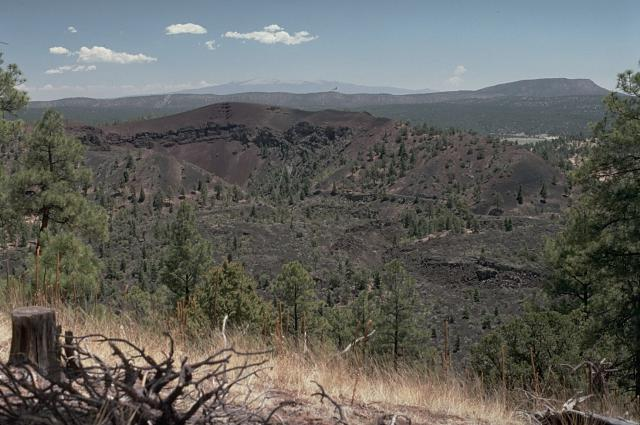
- Bandera Crater in the center is part of the Zuni-Bandera lava field.

Highest point
- Elevation: 8,366 ft (2,550 m)
- Coordinates: 34°48′N 108°00′W

Geography
- Location: Cibola County, New Mexico, US

Geology
- Rock age: 3.8 million years
- Mountain type: Volcanic field
- Last eruption: 1170 BCE ± 300 years

Zuni-Bandera volcanic field (also known as Bandera lava field, Grants Malpais and Malpais volcanic field) is a volcanic field located in the state of New Mexico, United States.

The volcanic field has been considered for geothermal exploitation.

It is on the Trails of the Ancients Byway, one of the designated New Mexico Scenic Byways.

== Origins ==
The Zuni-Bandera volcanic field lies along the Jemez Lineament, a zone of weakness in the lower crust and upper mantle that allows magma formed in the mantle to reach the surface. The magmas erupted in the field includes both tholeiitic basalt (an iron-rich basalt with a low alkali content) and alkaline basalt. The tholeiitic basalt shows chemical and isotopic signatures of magma formed from the spinel-rich mantle rock of the lithosphere, the outer rigid shell of the Earth that includes the crust and uppermost mantle. The alkaline basalt, by contrast, formed from the garnet-rich mantle rock of the asthenosphere, the ductile region of the mantle just below the lithosphere. Little crustal material was assimilated into the magmas, although the tholeiitic magma experienced some fractional crystallization at shallow depths in the crust.

== Exploration ==
A significant portion of the volcanic field is part of the El Malpais National Monument. Several of the lava tubes are available for exploration by permit. In addition, hiking trails enable visitors to see the lava field's unique characteristics.

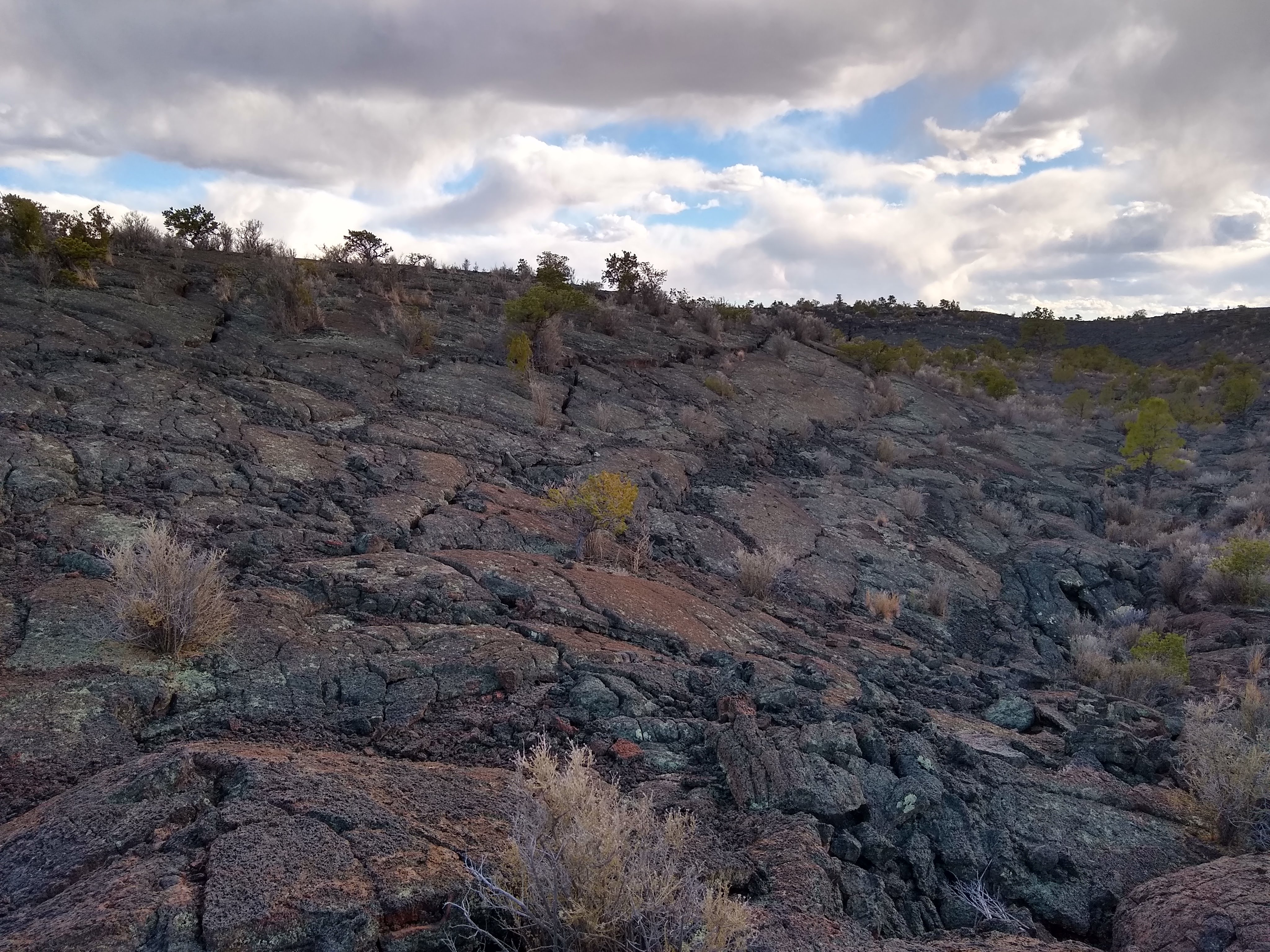
Lava field near lava falls at El Malpais

== Bandera Crater ==
Located on private property at 35.0°N 108.08°W and possessing a height of 2,533 metres (8,310 ft), Bandera Crater last erupted between 9,500 and 10,900 years ago.

The nearly 17.5-mile-long (28.2 km) lava tube emanating from this crater is the longest in North America. Most of the lava tube has collapsed but portions still remain as caves. One of these caves contains an over-900-year-old ice cave and can be accessed by the public. The land that contains the ice cave was purchased by Sylvestre Mirabal in the early 1900s. Mirabal mined the ice in the ice cave to cool the beer in a saloon that he operated. His daughter married into the Candelaria family, which continues to own and operate the ice cave to this day. Ice mining was halted in 1946.

The ice cave itself never gets above 31 °F (−1 °C). It is currently 20 feet (6.1 m) thick and has a green hue due to Arctic algae.

== Other Notable Vents ==
Name	Elevation	Coordinates	Last eruption
Cerro Bandera	2,552 metres (8,373 ft)	35.0°N 108.1°W	-
El Calderon	2,320 metres (7,612 ft)	34.97°N 108.02°W	-
Cerro Colorado	-	-	-
Cerro Encierro	2,298 metres (7,539 ft)	34.88°N 108.05°W	-
Hoyo De Cibola	2,380 metres (7,808 ft)	34.88°N 108.12°W	-
Cerro Hueco (Deer Mountain)	2,441 metres (8,009 ft)	-	-
Laguna	-	-	-
Lost Woman	2,459 metres (8,068 ft)	34.97°N 108.08°W	-
McCarty's Flow	2,244 metres (7,362 ft)	35.0°N 107.8°W	2,500-3,900 years ago
Paxton Springs	2,490 metres (8,169 ft)	35.07°N 108.07°W	-
Cerro Rendija	2,494 metres (8,182 ft)	34.95°N 108.13°W	-
La Tetra (Cerro Tetra)	2,458 metres (8,064 ft)	34.98°N 108.05°W	-
El Tintero	2,201 metres (7,221 ft)	-	-
Twin Craters	2,423 metres (7,949 ft)	34.98°N 108.07°W	15,800-17,800 years ago

== See also ==
- List of volcanoes in the United States
- List of volcanic fields
- El Malpais National Monument
