= Chongqing =

Municipality in Southwestern China

Chongqing 重庆 Chungking
- Municipality
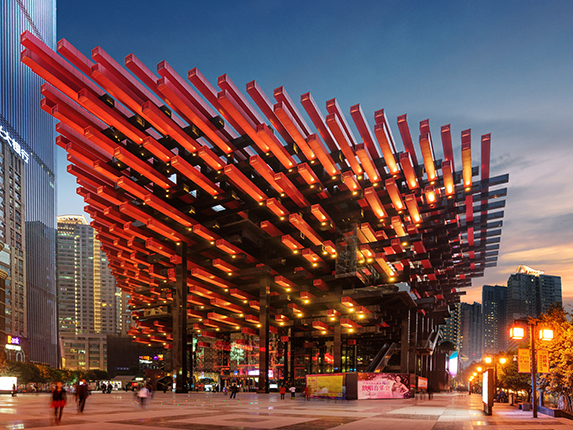
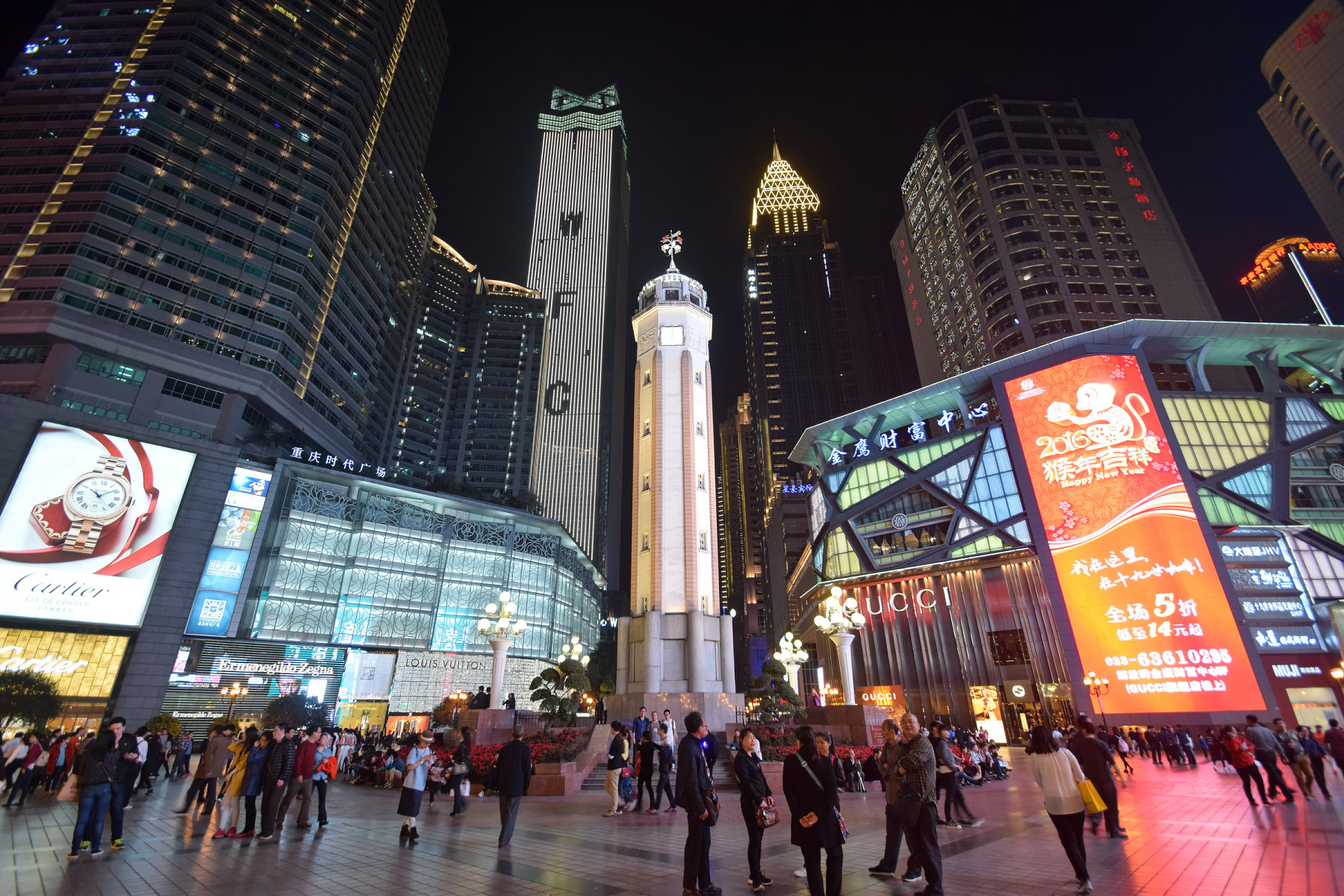
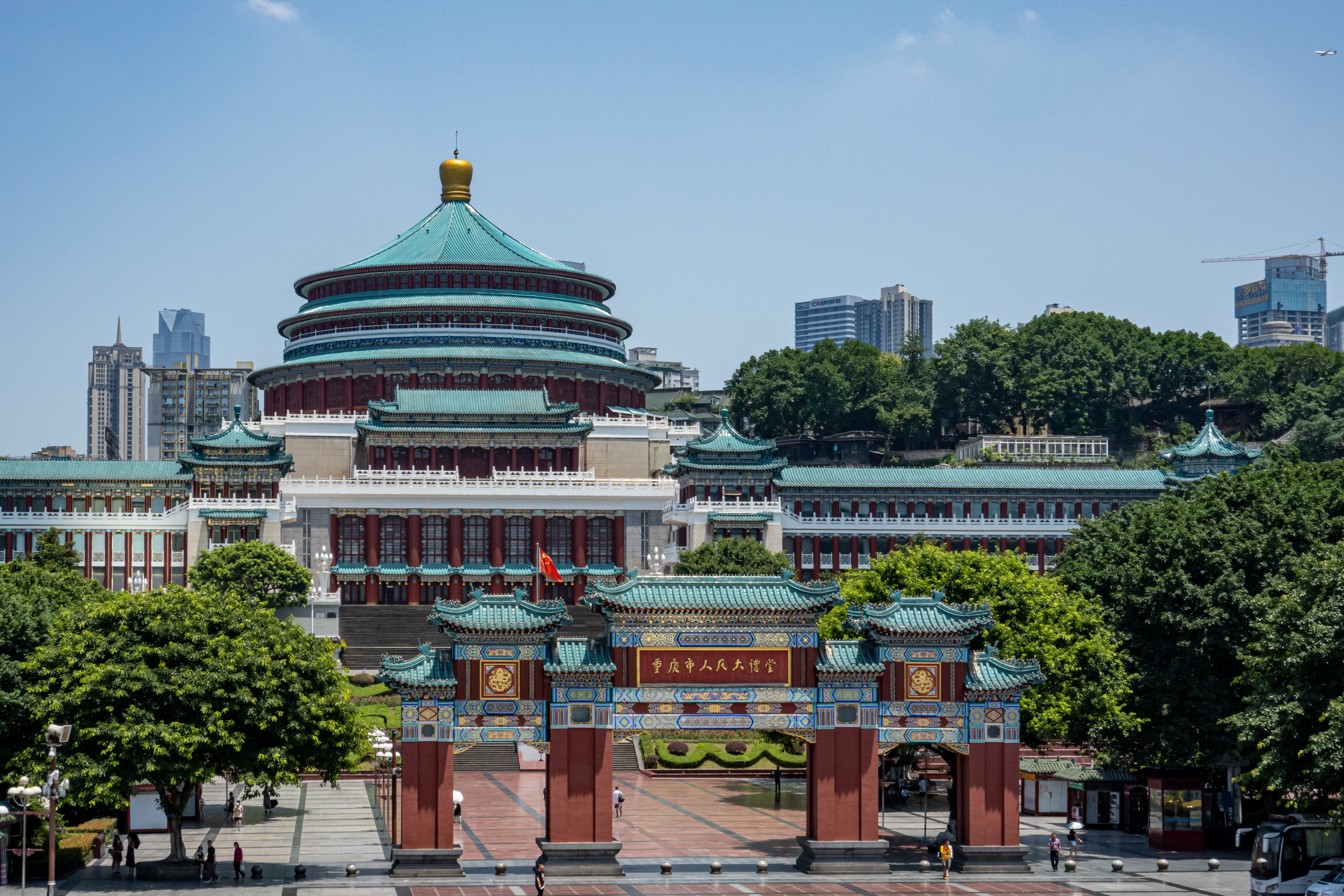
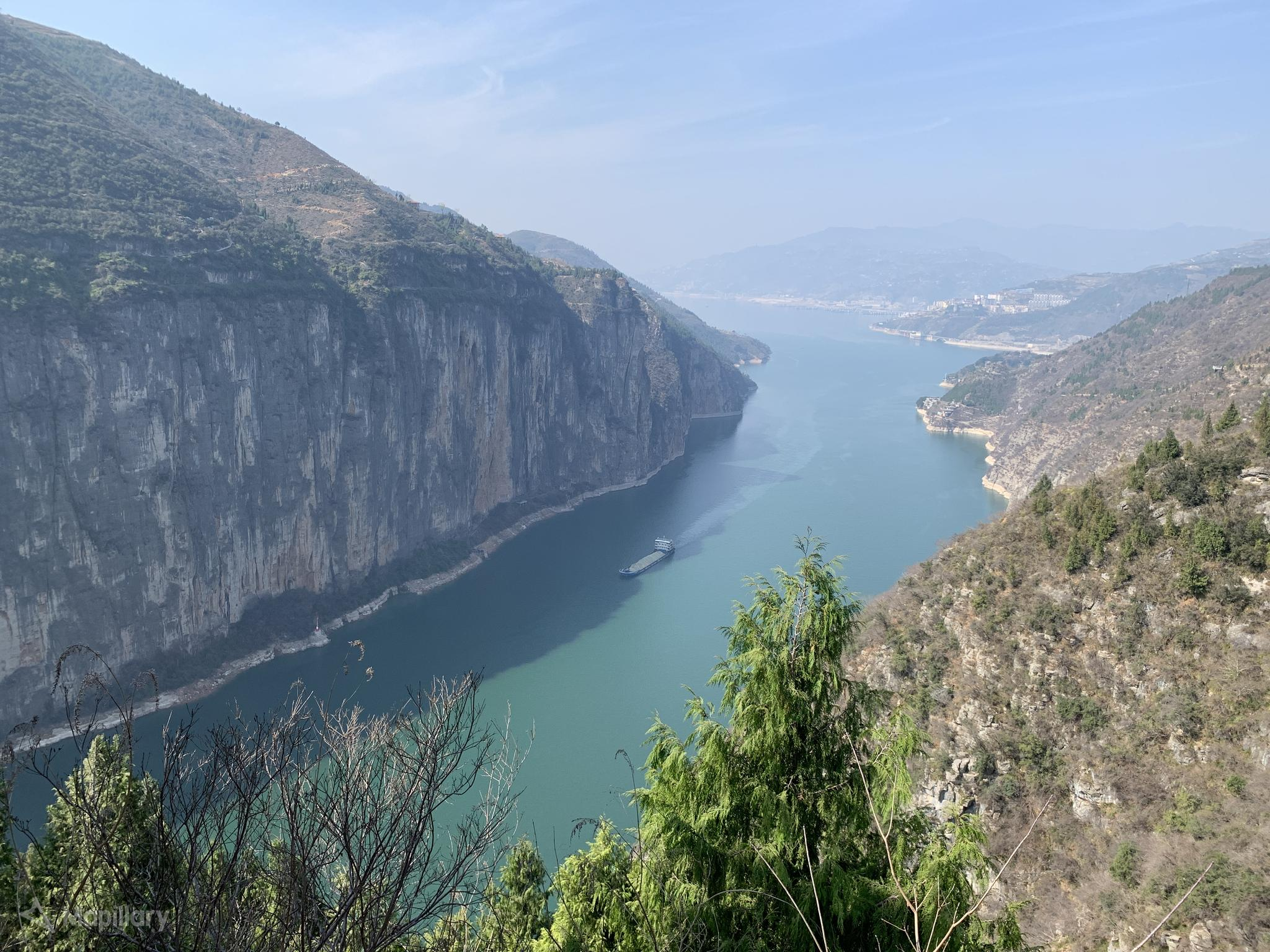
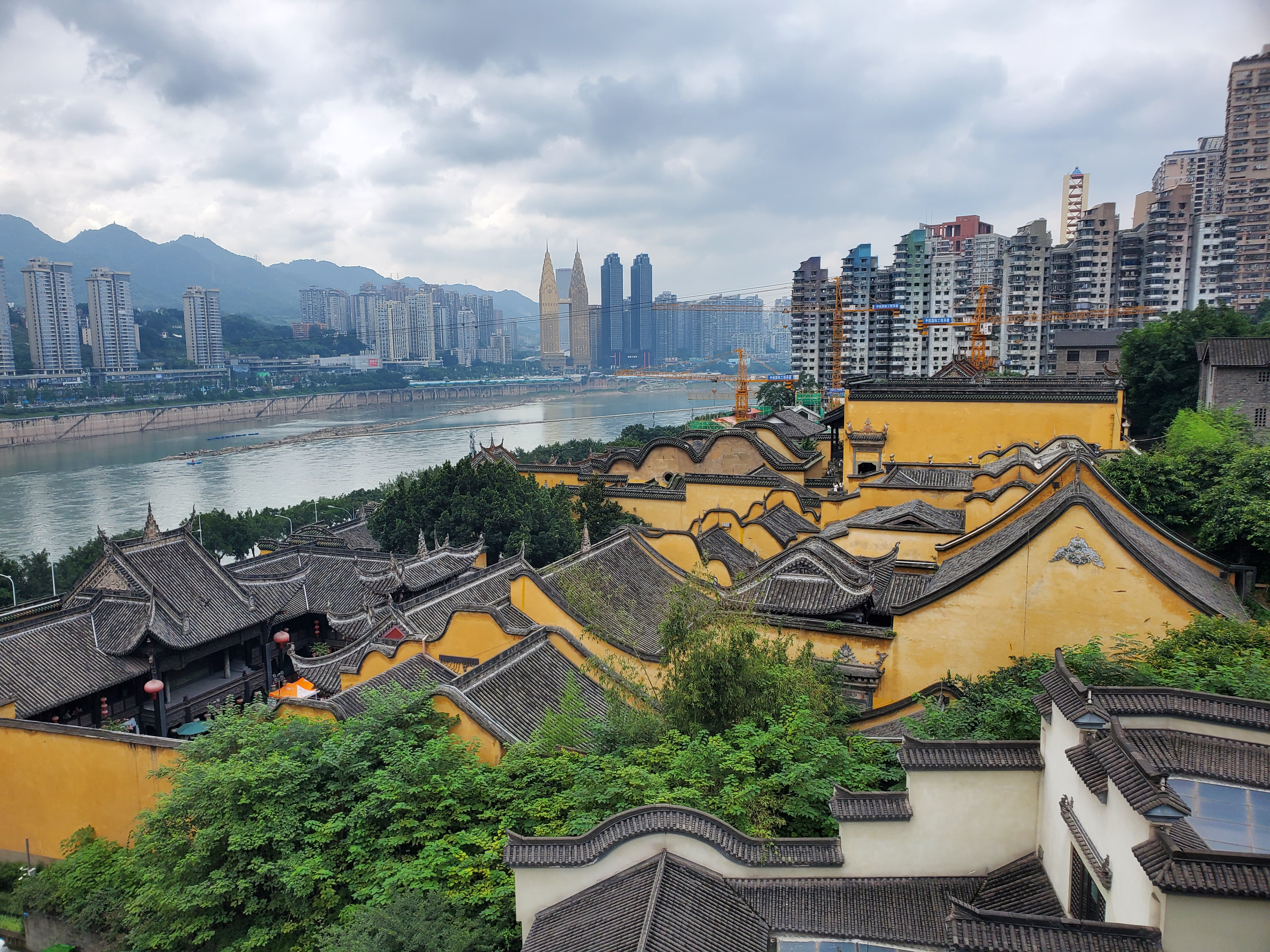
- Yuzhong District Chongqing Art Museum Liziba Station Jiefangbei CBD Chongqing People's Auditorium Qutang Gorge Huguang Guild Hall

- Location of Chongqing Municipality within China
- Interactive map of Chongqing
- Coordinates (Chongqing municipal government): 29°33′49″N 106°33′01″E
- Country: China
- Settled: c. 316 BC
- Separated from Sichuan: 14 March 1997
- Municipal seat: Yuzhong District
- Divisions; - County-level; - Township-level: 25 districts, 12 counties

Government
  - Type: Municipality
  - Body: Chongqing Municipal People's Congress
  - Party Secretary: Yuan Jiajun
  - Congress Chairperson: Wang Jiong
  - Mayor: Chen Xinwu (acting)
  - Municipal CPPCC Chairperson: Cheng Lihua
  - National People's Congress Representation: 58 deputies

Area
  - Municipality: 82,403 km^{2} (31,816 sq mi)
  - Rank: 26th
  - Built up area: 5,472.8 km^{2} (2,113.1 sq mi)
- Elevation: 244 m (801 ft)
- Highest elevation (Yintiao Ling): 2,797 m (9,177 ft)

Population (2020 census (total), 2018 (otherwise))
  - Municipality: 32,054,159
  - Rank: 19th
  - Density: 388.99/km^{2} (1,007.5/sq mi)
  - Urban: 22,251,500 (Note: Total urban population in the municipality.)
  - Built up area: 9,580,770
  - Built up area density: 1,750.6/km^{2} (4,534.1/sq mi)

GDP(2025)
  - Municipality: CN¥ 3,376 billion (17th); US$ 484.6 billion
  - Per capita: CN¥105,315 (10th); US$15,118
- Time zone: UTC+8 (CST)
- Postal codes: 4000 00 – 4099 00
- Area code: 23
- ISO 3166 code: CN-CQ
  - Growth: ▲2.6%
- Vehicle registration: 渝A, 渝D (Yuzhong, Jiangbei, Jiulongpo, Dadukou); 渝B (Nan'an, Shapingba, Beibei, Wansheng, Shuangqiao, Yubei, Banan, Changshou); 渝C (Yongchuan, Hechuan, Jiangjin, Qijiang, Tongnan, Tongliang, Dazu, Rongchang, Bishan); 渝F (Wanzhou, Liangping, Chengkou, Wushan, Wuxi, Zhongxian, Kaizhou, Fengjie, Yunyang); 渝G (Fuling, Nanchuan, Dianjiang, Fengdu, Wulong); 渝H (Qianjiang, Shizhu, Xiushan, Youyang, Pengshui)
- Climate: Cfa
- HDI (2023): 0.804 (9th) – high
- Abbreviation: CQ / 渝; Yú
- Website: www.cq.gov.cn (in Chinese); English version
- Symbols
- Flower: Camellia japonica
- Tree: Ficus lacor

Chongqing
- "Chongqing" in simplified (top) and traditional (bottom) Chinese characters
- Simplified Chinese: 重庆
- Traditional Chinese: 重慶
- Hanyu Pinyin: Chóngqìng
- Postal: Chungking
- Literal meaning: "Doubled Celebration"
Transcriptions
Standard Mandarin
- Hanyu Pinyin: Chóngqìng
- Bopomofo: ㄔㄨㄥˊ ㄑㄧㄥˋ
- Gwoyeu Romatzyh: Chorngchinq
- Wade–Giles: Chʻung^{2}-chʻing^{4}
- Tongyong Pinyin: Chóngcìng
- Yale Romanization: ChúngChìng
- IPA: [ʈʂʰʊ̌ŋ.tɕʰîŋ]
other Mandarin
- Xiao'erjing: چَوڭچٍڭ
- Sichuanese Pinyin: Cong^{2}qin^{4}; [tsʰoŋ˨˩ tɕʰin˨˩˦]
Wu
- Romanization: Zon^{上}-chin^{去}
Hakka
- Romanization: Tshùng-khin
Yue: Cantonese
- Yale Romanization: Chùhnghing
- Jyutping: Cung4hing3
- IPA: [tsʰʊŋ˩.hɪŋ˧]
Southern Min
- Hokkien POJ: Tiông-khèng
- Tâi-lô: Tiông-khìng

Chongqing (Note: /ˌtʃɒŋˈtʃɪŋ/ or /ˈtʃɒŋtʃɪŋ/; Chinese: 重庆; pinyin: Chóngqìng; Sichuanese pronunciation: [tsʰoŋ˨˩tɕʰin˨˩˦],Standard Mandarin pronunciation: [ʈʂʰʊ̌ŋ.tɕʰîŋ]), previously romanized as Chungking (/ˈtʃʊŋˈkɪŋ/)) is a provincial-level direct-administered municipality in Southwestern China. It is one of the four direct-administered municipalities of China and the only one located inland.

The municipality covers a large geographical area roughly the size of Austria, which includes several disjunct urban areas in addition to Chongqing proper. Due to its classification, the municipality of Chongqing is the largest city proper in the world by population, though it is not the most populous urban area.

The municipality of Chongqing is the only Chinese city with a resident population of over 30 million, but that number includes its large rural population. In 2020, Chongqing surpassed Shanghai as China's largest municipality by urban population and, as of 2024, it had an urban population of 23.01 million. The municipality contains 26 districts, eight counties, and four autonomous counties.

The city served as the wartime capital of the Republic of China (ROC) during the Second Sino-Japanese War (1937–1945). On 14 March 1997, the current municipality was separated from the surrounding province of Sichuan, with the goal of furthering development in the central and western parts of the country.

Chongqing is one of China's national central cities. It is a connection in the Yangtze River Economic Belt and a base for the country's Belt and Road Initiative. Chongqing Jiangbei International Airport is the second-busiest airport in China, and is one of the top 50 busiest airports in the world. The city's monorail system is the world's longest and busiest, with 70 stations—the most of any system. It is the headquarters of Changan Automobile, one of the "Big Four" car manufacturers in China. As of 2023, the city hosts 12 foreign representations, the fifth-most in China, behind Beijing, Shanghai, Guangzhou, and Chengdu. It is one of the top 35 cities globally by scientific research output, and the municipality is home to several notable universities, including Chongqing University, Southwest University, and Chongqing University of Posts and Telecommunications.

== History ==
=== Antiquity ===
During the Warring States Period, it was the gateway to the western border of the State of Chu, and its county territory belonged to the territory of Wu Commandery. In the thirtieth year of King Zhaoxiang of Qin (277 BC), Zhang Ruo, the governor of Qin Shu, attacked Chu and captured Wu Commandery. He also ordered Bai Qi to circle the territory of the State of Han, launch a surprise attack on the capital of the State of Chu, Ying (now Jiangling), and burn Yiling (now Yichang). After cutting off the rescue of Wu Commandery by the State of Chu, he seized Wu Commandery and the area south of the Yangtze River, establishing Qianzhong Commandery. Wu Commandery was under the jurisdiction of the county (with its administrative center in present-day Dachang Town) and belonged to the State of Qin. Later, it was transferred to the jurisdiction of Nan County. The county was named Wushan from then on. Chongqing's location is historically associated with the State of Ba. It was named Jiangzhou (江州) by a Qin general Zhang Yi.

=== Imperial era ===
Jiangzhou subsequently remained under Qin Shi Huang's rule during the Qin dynasty, the successor of the Qin State, as well as the rule of Han dynasty emperors. Jiangzhou was subsequently renamed during the Northern and Southern dynasties to Chu Prefecture (楚州), then again in 581 AD (Sui dynasty) to Yu Prefecture (渝州), and later in 1102 during Northern Song to Gong Prefecture (恭州). The name Yu however survives to this day as an abbreviation for Chongqing, as well as for the city's historic center, where the old town once stood; its name is Yuzhong (渝中, Central Yu). It received its current name in 1189, after Prince Zhao Dun of the Southern Song dynasty described his crowning as king and then Emperor Guangzong as a "double celebration" (simplified Chinese: 双重喜庆; traditional Chinese: 雙重喜慶; pinyin: shuāngchóng xǐqìng, or chóngqìng in short). To mark the occasion of his enthronement, Yu Prefecture was therefore converted to Chongqing Fu.

In 1362 (during the Yuan dynasty), Ming Yuzhen, a peasant rebel leader, established the Daxia Kingdom (大夏) at Chongqing for a short time. In 1621 (during the Ming dynasty), another short-lived kingdom of Daliang (大梁) was established by She Chongming (奢崇明) with Chongqing as its capital. In 1644, after the fall of the Ming dynasty to a rebel army, Chongqing, together with the rest of Sichuan, was captured by Zhang Xianzhong, who was said to have massacred a large number of people in Sichuan and depopulated the province, in part by causing many people to flee to safety elsewhere. The Manchus later conquered the province, and during the Qing dynasty, immigration to Chongqing and Sichuan took place with the support of the Qing emperor.

In 1890, the British Consulate General was opened in Chongqing. The following year, the city became the first inland commerce port open to foreigners, with the proviso that foreign ships should not be at liberty to trade there until Chinese-owned steamers had succeeded in ascending the Yangtze river. This restriction was abolished by the Treaty of Shimonoseki in 1895, which declared the city open on the same terms as other ports, although it was not until 1907 that a steamship made the journey without the help of manual haulers. From 1896 to 1904, the American, German, French, and Japanese consulates were opened in Chongqing.

=== Provisional wartime capital of the Republic of China ===
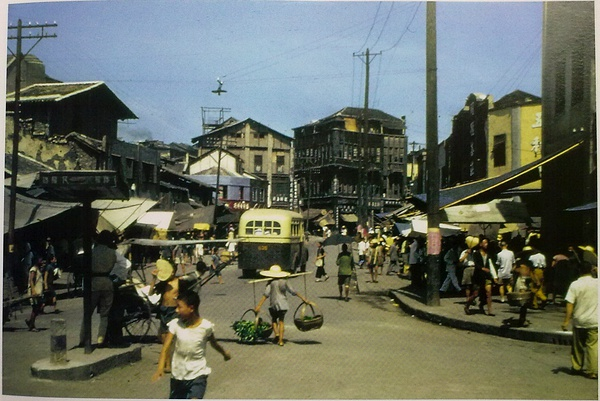
A street scene in Chongqing, c. 1944

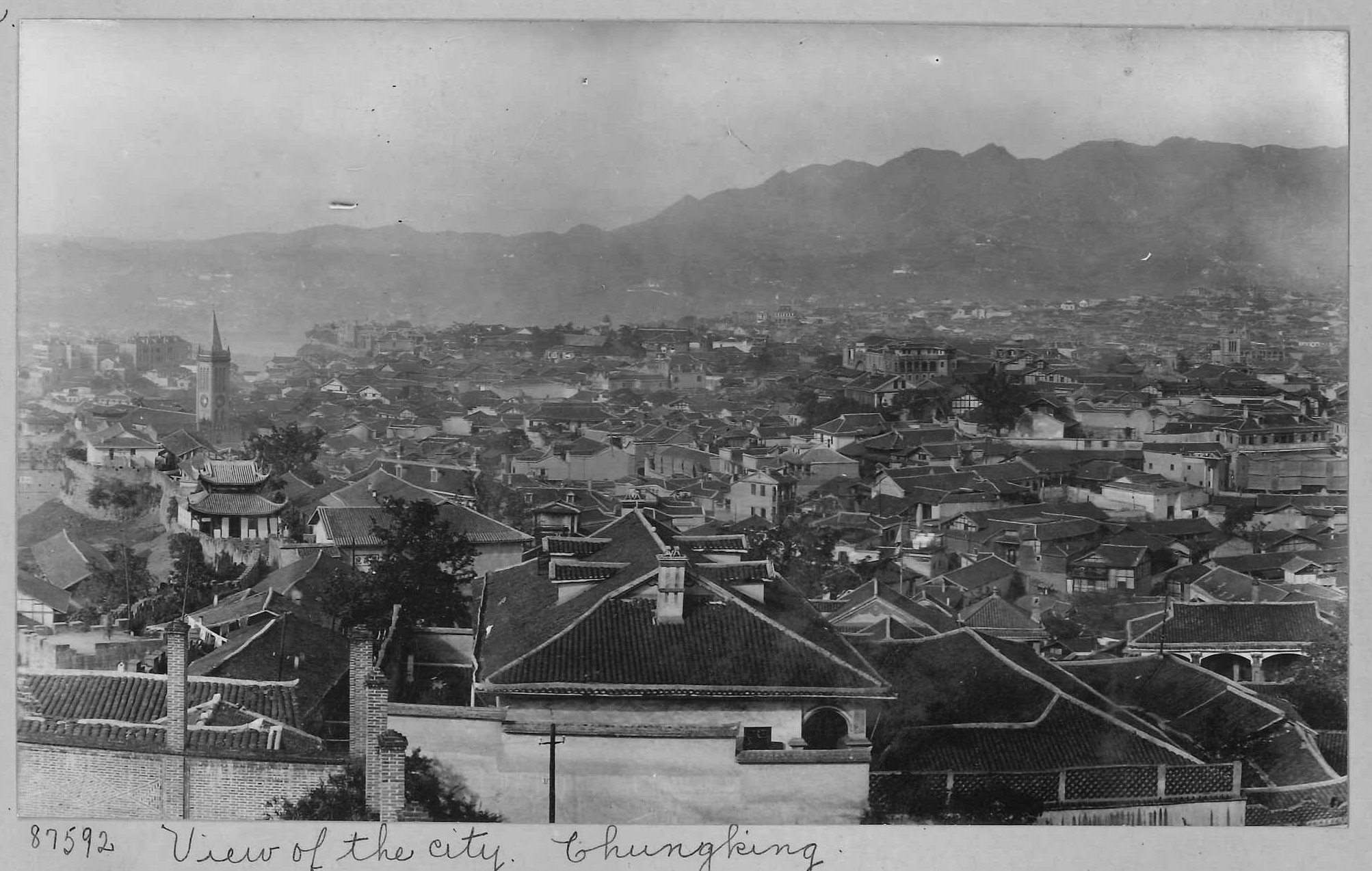
View of Chongqing, circa 1900–1930, showing the city's characteristic hillside urban landscape along the Yangtze River.

During and after the Second Sino-Japanese War, from November 1937 to May 1946, it was Generalissimo Chiang Kai-shek's provisional capital. After the General and remaining army had lived there for a time following their retreat in 1938 from the previous capital of Wuhan, it was formally declared the second capital city (陪都; péidū; p'ei²-tu¹) on 6 September 1940. After Britain, the United States, and other Allies entered the war in Asia in December 1941, one of the Allies' deputy commanders of operations in Southeast Asia (Southeast Asia Command SEAC), Joseph Stilwell, was based in the city.

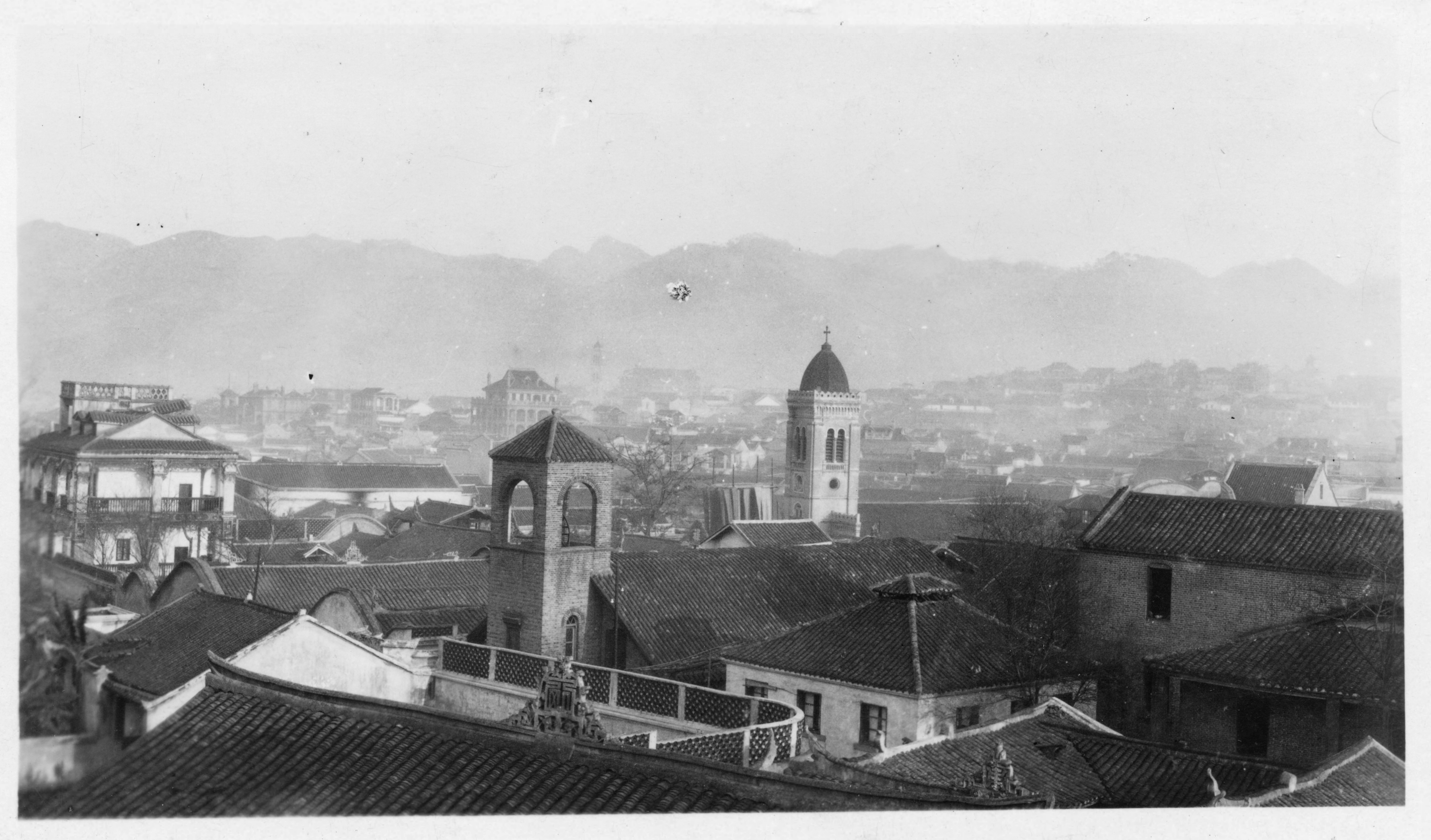
Church buildings in Chongqing, 1941. The foreground structure is a Methodist Episcopal Mission church.

The city was also visited by Lord Louis Mountbatten, the Supreme Commander of SEAC which was itself headquartered in Sri Lanka. Chiang Kai Shek as Supreme Commander in China worked closely with Stilwell. From 1938 to 1943, the city suffered from continuous massive bombing campaigns of the Imperial Japanese Navy and Army Air Forces; battles of which were fought entirely by the Chinese Air Force squadrons and anti-aircraft artillery units. Many lives were saved by the air-raid shelters which took advantage of the mountainous terrain. Chongqing was acclaimed to be the "City of Heroes" due to the indomitable spirits of its people as well as their contributions and sacrifices during the war. Many factories and universities were relocated from eastern China and ultimately to Chongqing during years of setbacks in the war, transforming this city from an inland port to a heavily industrialized city.

=== Chinese Civil War ===
After World War II ended, Chongqing became one of the last refuges of the Nationalist Kuomintang government on the mainland during the Chinese Civil War. Following the Yangtze River Crossing campaign, the KMT capital of Nanjing was conquered by the Communists on 23 April. The KMT decamped first to Guangzhou, then Chongqing. Chongqing served as the KMT capital until late November 1949, when the Nationalist KMT government withdrew from the city by air.

=== Municipality status ===
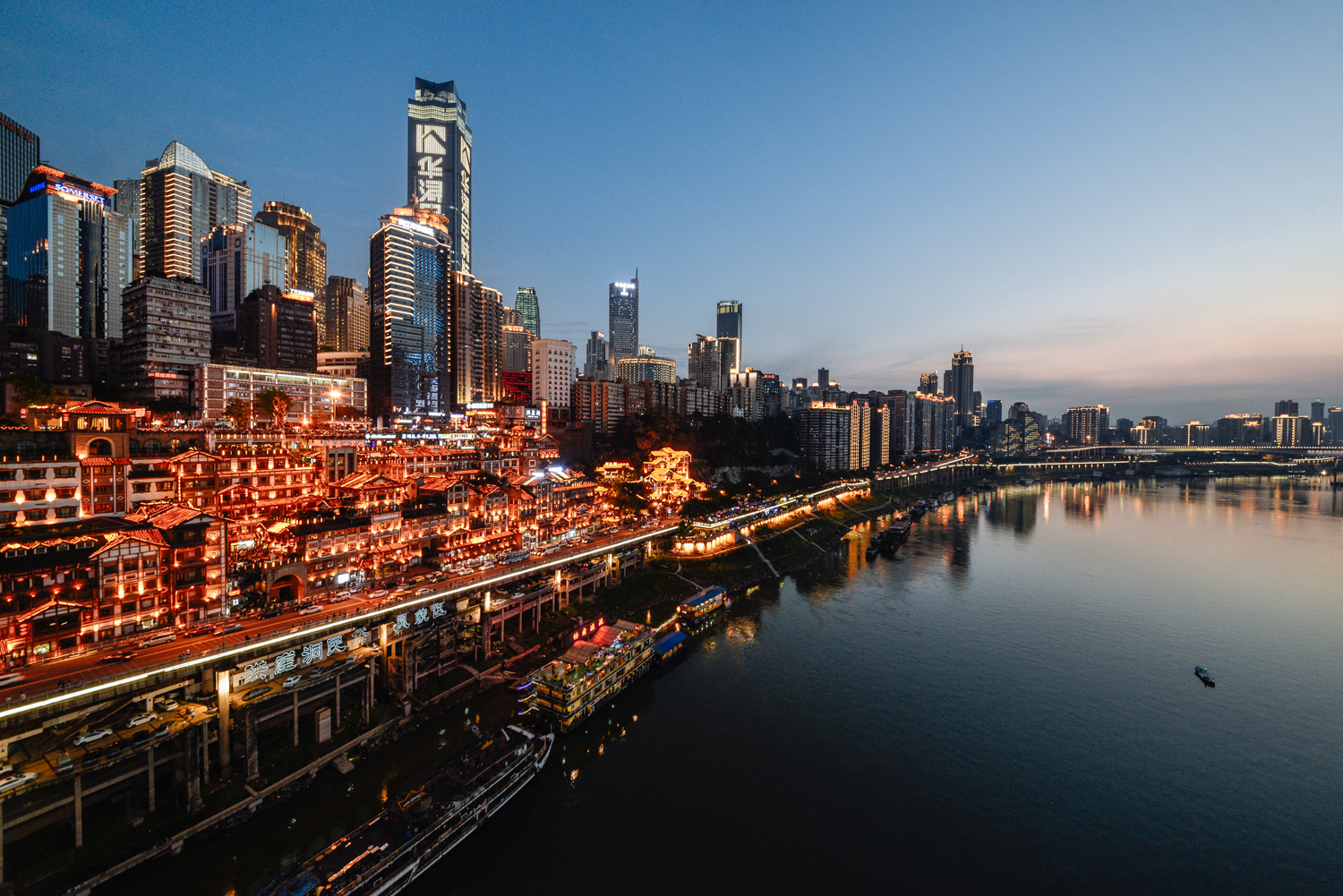
A sunset view of Jiefangbei CBD and Hongya Cave, taken in 2017

On 14 March 1997, the Eighth National People's Congress decided to merge the sub-provincial city with adjacent Fuling, Wanxian, and Qianjiang prefectures that it had governed on behalf of the province since September 1996, and grant it independence from Sichuan. The resulting single entity became Chongqing Municipality, containing 30,020,000 people in forty-three former counties without intermediate political levels. The municipality became the spearhead of China's effort to develop its western regions and to coordinate the resettlement of residents from the reservoir areas of the Three Gorges Dam project. Its first official ceremony took place on 18 June 1997.

On 8 February 2010, Chongqing became one of the nine National Central Cities, along with Beijing, Tianjin, Shanghai, Guangzhou, Chengdu, Wuhan, Xi'an, and Zhengzhou. According to Zhou Liqun, a consultant for the National Development and Reform Commission of China, Chongqing's status as a National Central City would encourage the development of Western China. Chongqing, which is located in central-western China, would complement the other National Central Cities, all of which are located along China's eastern coastline. The same year on 18 June, the Liangjiang New Area was established in Chongqing, which was the third state-level new area at the time of its establishment.

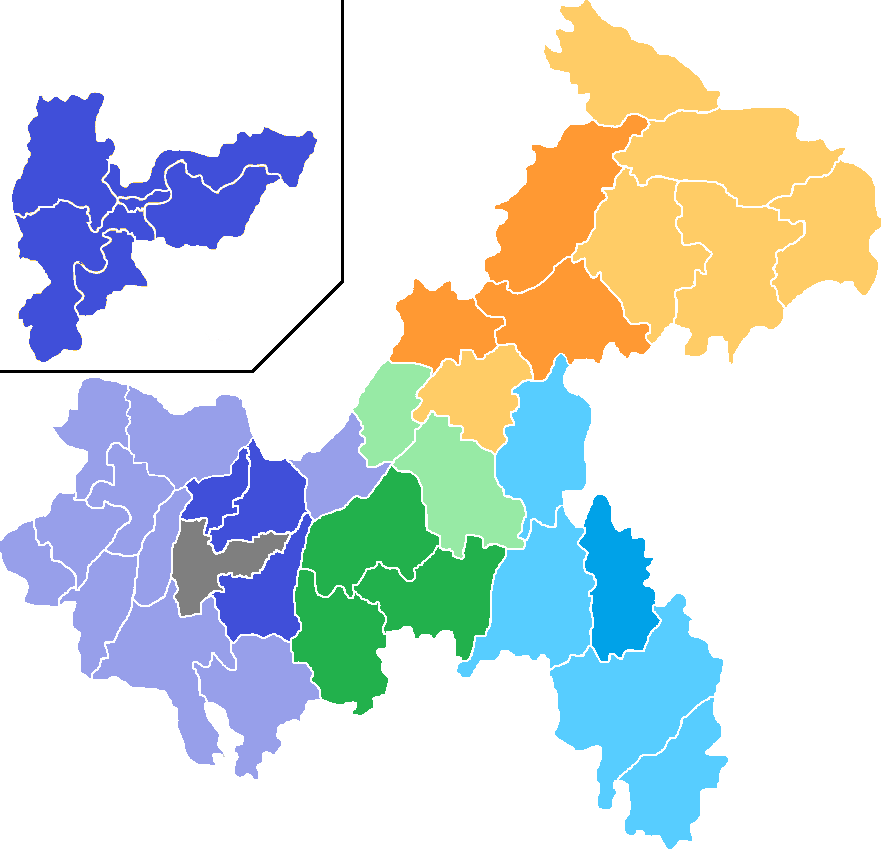
Former Prefecture-Level City of Chongqing; Former Prefecture-Level City of Fuling; Former Prefecture-Level City of Wanxian; Former Prefecture of Qianjiang	Districts composing the Main urban area of Chongqing city Districts; Counties; Autonomous Counties

== Geography ==
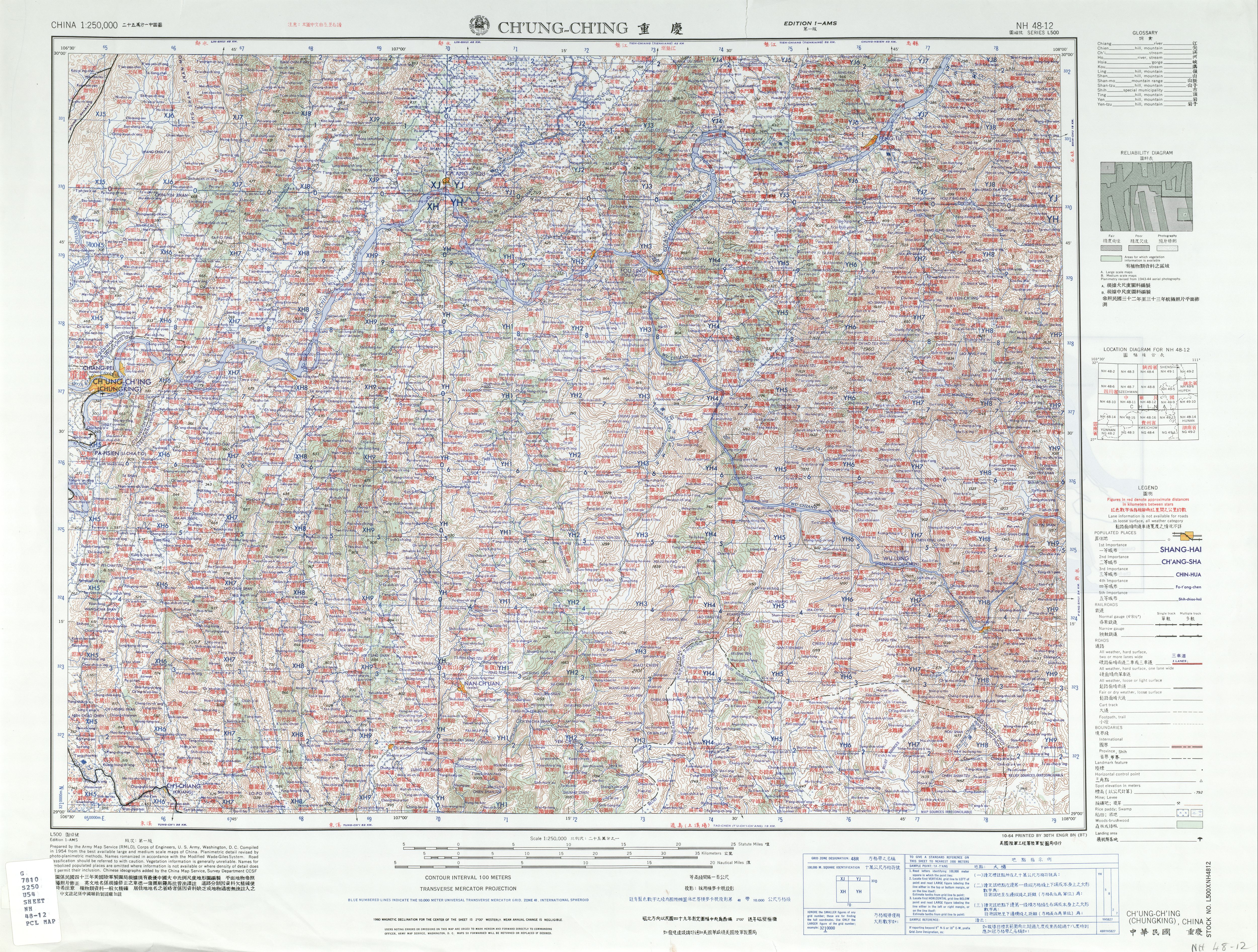
Map including Chongqing (labeled as 重慶 CH'UNG-CH'ING (CHUNGKING)) (AMS, 1954)

=== Physical geography and topography ===
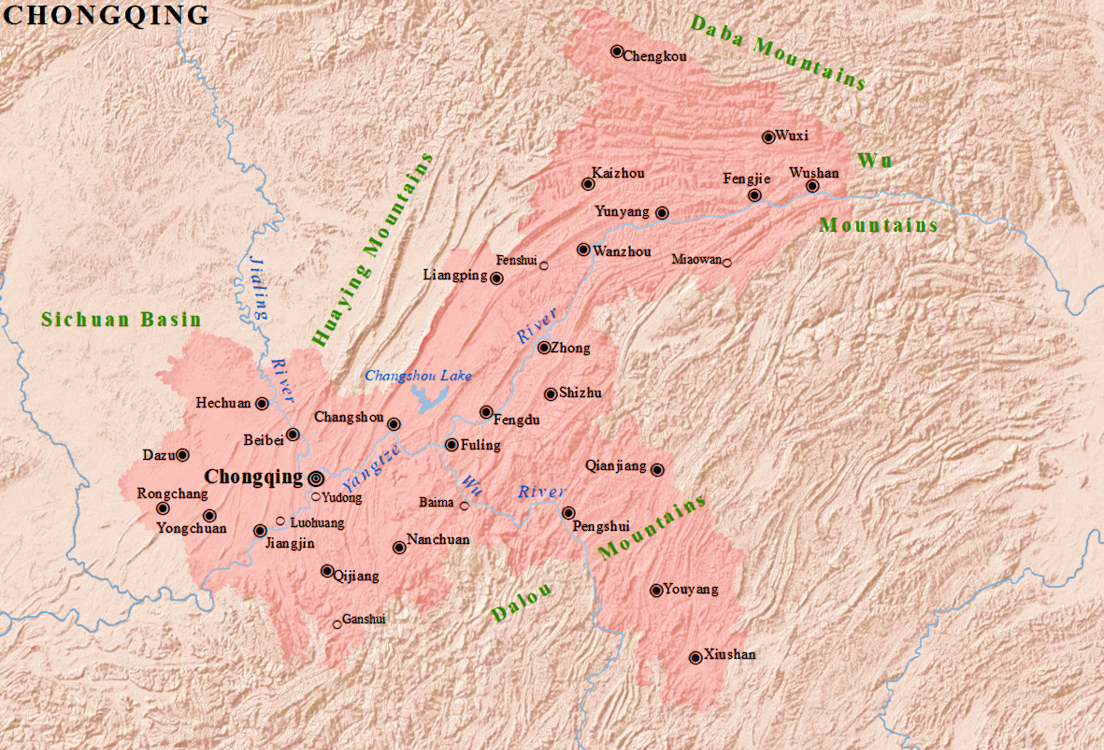
Topography of Chongqing

Chongqing is located in the subtropics, situated in the transitional area between the Sichuan Basin and the plain on the middle and lower reaches of the Yangtze. Its climate features frequent monsoon conditions, often raining at night in late spring and early summer. The city's "night rain in the Ba Mountains" features in poems throughout Chinese history, including "Written on a Rainy Night—A Letter to the North" by Li Shangyin. Its territory is 470 kilometers (290 mi) from east to west at its longest, and 450 kilometers (280 mi) from north to south at its widest. It borders Hubei and Hunan to the east, Sichuan and Shaanxi to the north, and Guizhou to the south.

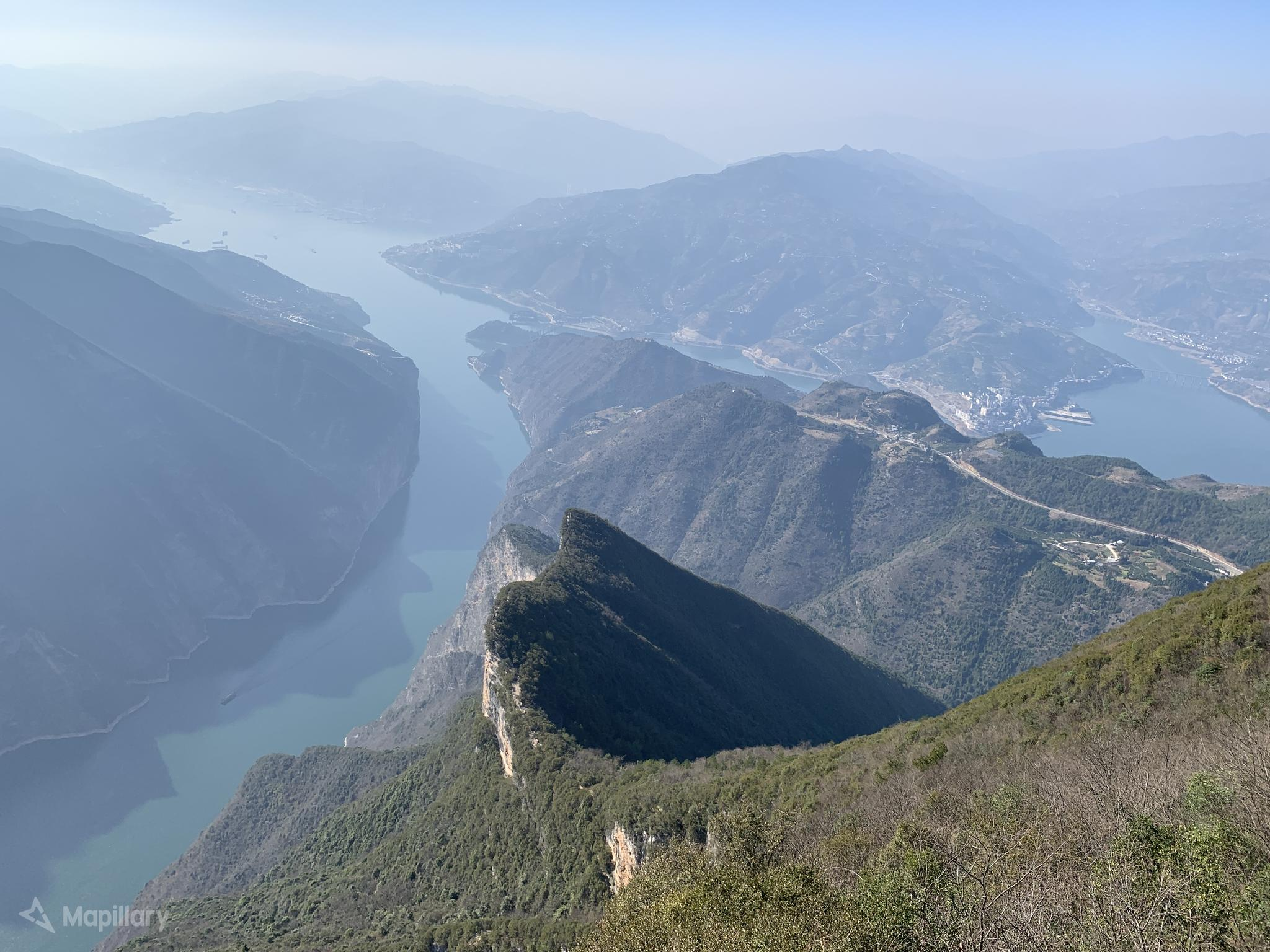
The Qutang Gorge on the Yangtze

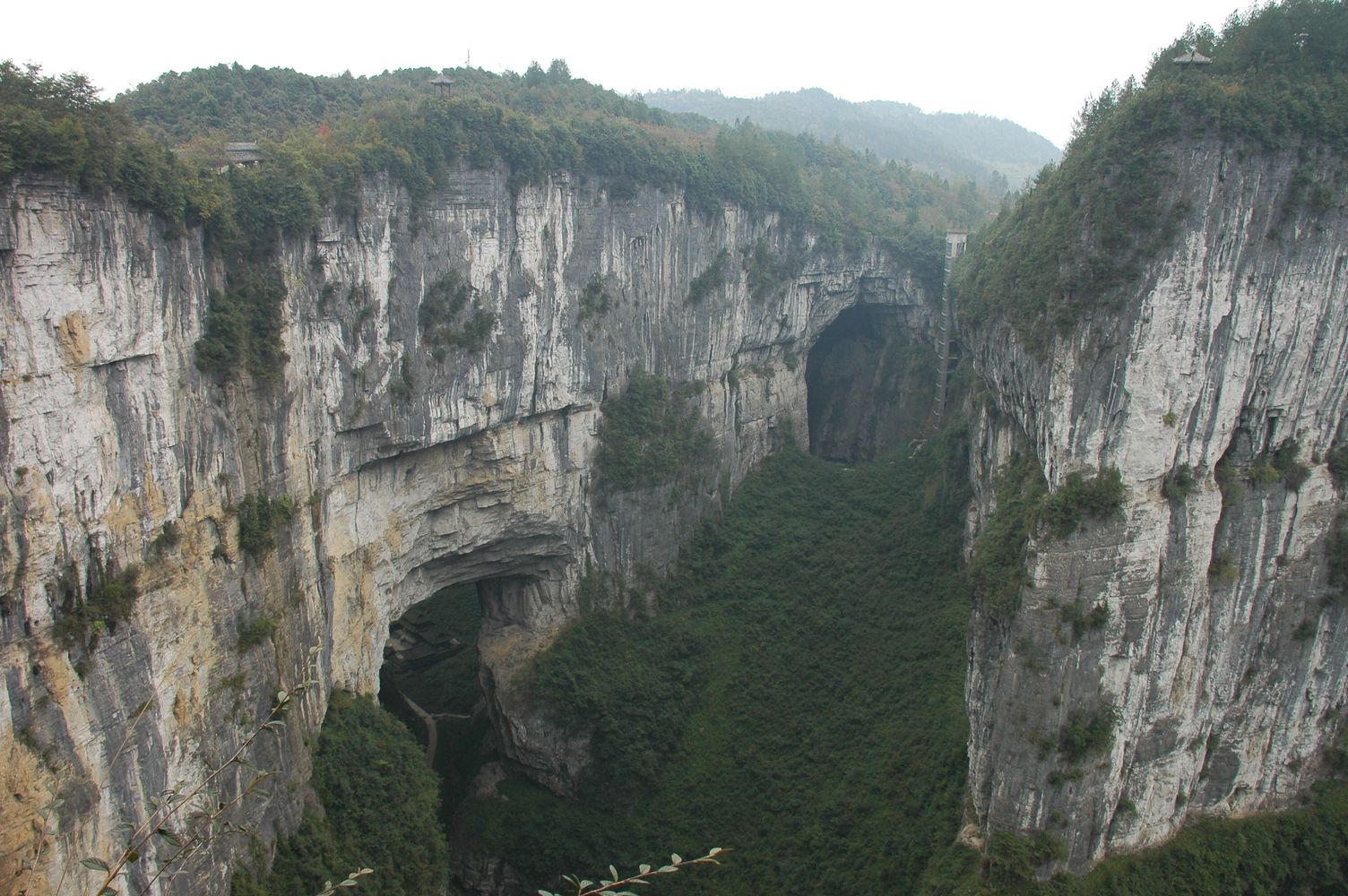
Wulong Karst

Chongqing covers a large area crisscrossed by rivers and mountains. The Daba Mountains stand in the north, the Wu Gorge in the east, the Wuling Mountains in the southeast, and the Dalou Mountains in the south. The area slopes downward from north to south towards the Yangtze valley, and features a large massif of mountains and hills, with steep sloping areas at different heights. Karst landscape is common in this area, and stone forests, numerous collections of peaks, limestone caves and valleys can be found in many places. The Longshuixia Gap (Chinese: 龙水峡地缝), with its Three Natural Bridges, has made the region a popular tourist attraction. The Yangtze River runs through the whole area from west to east, covering a course of 665 kilometers (413 mi), cutting through the Wu Mountains at three places and forming the well-known Three Gorges: the Qutang, Wuxia and Xiling gorges. Coming from northwest and running through "the Jialing Lesser Three Gorges" of Libi, Wentang and Guanyin, the Jialing River joins the Yangtze in Chongqing.

Leaving at dawn the White Emperor crowned with cloud,
I've sailed a thousand li through canyons in a day.
With the monkeys' adieus the riverbanks are loud,
My skiff has left ten thousand mountains far away.

— Li Bai's Poem of Chongqing's Baidi Cheng

The central urban area of Chongqing, called Chongqing proper, is built on mountains and partially surrounded by the Yangtze and Jialing rivers. With its special topography, Chongqing's topography includes mountains, rivers, forests, springs, waterfalls, gorges, and caves. The Tang dynasty poet Li Bai was inspired by the natural scenery and wrote this epigram.

The Zhongliang (中梁山) and Tongluo (铜锣山) mountains roughly form the eastern and western boundaries of Chongqing's urban area. Several high mountains are situated outside central Chongqing, including the 1,709.4-meter (5,608 ft)-high Wugong Ling Mountain in Jiangjin.

=== Climate ===
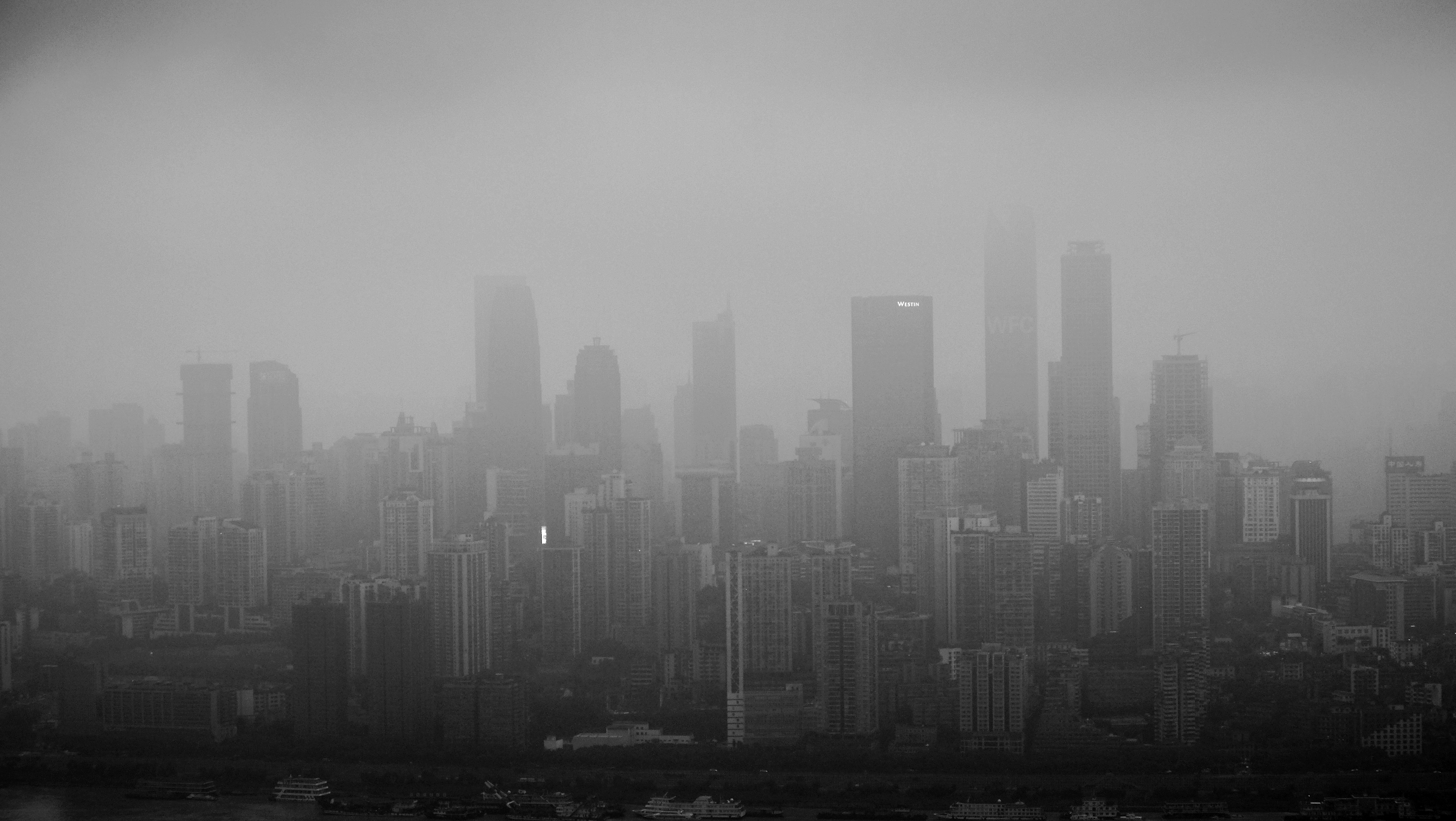
In the spring and fall, downtown Chongqing is often enshrouded in fog.

Chongqing has a monsoonal humid subtropical climate (Köppen Cwa), bordering on an ordinary humid subtropical climate (Köppen Cfa) and for most of the year experiences very high relative humidity, with all months above 75%. Known as one of the "Three Furnaces" of the Yangtze River, along with Wuhan and Nanjing, its summers are long and among the hottest and most humid in China, with highs of 34 °C (93 °F) in July and August in the urban area. Winters are short and somewhat mild, but damp and overcast. The city's location in the Sichuan Basin causes it to have one of the lowest annual sunshine totals nationally, at only 983 hours, lower than much of Northern Europe; the monthly percent possible sunshine in the city proper ranges from a mere 5% in January to 43% in August. Extremes since 1951 have ranged from −1.8 °C (29 °F) on 11 January 1955 to 43.7 °C (111 °F) on 18 and 19 August 2022

Chongqing, with over 100 days of fog per year, is known as the "Fog City" (Chinese: 雾都); this is because in the spring and fall, a thick layer of fog enshrouds it for 68 days per year. During the Second Sino-Japanese War (1937–1945), this special weather possibly played a role in protecting the city from being overrun by the Imperial Japanese Army.

Climate data for Chongqing (Shapingba District), elevation 259 m (850 ft), (1991–2020 normals, extremes 1951–present)
Month	Jan	Feb	Mar	Apr	May	Jun	Jul	Aug	Sep	Oct	Nov	Dec	Year
Record high °C (°F)	19.0 (66.2)	27.6 (81.7)	34.3 (93.7)	36.5 (97.7)	38.9 (102.0)	39.8 (103.6)	42.0 (107.6)	43.7 (110.7)	42.0 (107.6)	37.4 (99.3)	29.6 (85.3)	21.5 (70.7)	43.7 (110.7)
Mean maximum °C (°F)	14.6 (58.3)	19.8 (67.6)	26.5 (79.7)	31.4 (88.5)	33.9 (93.0)	35.8 (96.4)	38.9 (102.0)	39.5 (103.1)	35.6 (96.1)	29.3 (84.7)	23.1 (73.6)	16.5 (61.7)	40.2 (104.4)
Mean daily maximum °C (°F)	10.4 (50.7)	13.6 (56.5)	18.6 (65.5)	23.9 (75.0)	27.4 (81.3)	29.8 (85.6)	33.7 (92.7)	33.9 (93.0)	28.5 (83.3)	22.0 (71.6)	17.3 (63.1)	11.7 (53.1)	22.6 (72.6)
Daily mean °C (°F)	8.1 (46.6)	10.4 (50.7)	14.5 (58.1)	19.2 (66.6)	22.6 (72.7)	25.4 (77.7)	28.9 (84.0)	28.9 (84.0)	24.4 (75.9)	18.9 (66.0)	14.5 (58.1)	9.5 (49.1)	18.8 (65.8)
Mean daily minimum °C (°F)	6.4 (43.5)	8.3 (46.9)	11.7 (53.1)	16.0 (60.8)	19.4 (66.9)	22.4 (72.3)	25.4 (77.7)	25.3 (77.5)	21.5 (70.7)	16.8 (62.2)	12.5 (54.5)	8.0 (46.4)	16.1 (61.0)
Mean minimum °C (°F)	2.1 (35.8)	3.8 (38.8)	6.5 (43.7)	10.9 (51.6)	14.3 (57.7)	18.2 (64.8)	21.6 (70.9)	21.3 (70.3)	16.8 (62.2)	11.2 (52.2)	7.0 (44.6)	3.2 (37.8)	1.1 (34.0)
Record low °C (°F)	−1.8 (28.8)	−0.8 (30.6)	1.2 (34.2)	2.8 (37.0)	10.8 (51.4)	15.5 (59.9)	19.2 (66.6)	17.8 (64.0)	14.3 (57.7)	6.9 (44.4)	0.7 (33.3)	−1.7 (28.9)	−1.8 (28.8)
Average precipitation mm (inches)	20.7 (0.81)	22.4 (0.88)	55.6 (2.19)	103.4 (4.07)	142.5 (5.61)	212.1 (8.35)	174.2 (6.86)	125.7 (4.95)	124.7 (4.91)	95.3 (3.75)	50.4 (1.98)	24.7 (0.97)	1,151.7 (45.33)
Average precipitation days (≥ 0.1 mm)	10.0	8.9	11.5	13.6	16.0	16.0	11.3	11.5	12.6	15.8	11.3	10.6	149.1
Average snowy days	0.2	0.1	0	0	0	0	0	0	0	0	0	0.1	0.4
Average relative humidity (%)	82	78	75	75	76	79	73	70	77	84	83	84	78
Mean monthly sunshine hours	16.6	32.9	72.8	105.8	109.7	98.7	169.3	175.2	102.6	46.6	35.0	18.0	983.2
Percentage possible sunshine	5	10	19	27	26	24	40	43	28	13	11	6	21
Average ultraviolet index	4	6	8	10	11	12	12	11	10	7	5	4	8
Source 1: China Meteorological Administration
Source 2: Weather Atlas (uv)

Climate data for Chongqing (Yubei District), elevation 465 m (1,526 ft), (1991–2020 normals, extremes 1981–present)
Month	Jan	Feb	Mar	Apr	May	Jun	Jul	Aug	Sep	Oct	Nov	Dec	Year
Record high °C (°F)	18.4 (65.1)	23.7 (74.7)	32.3 (90.1)	34.1 (93.4)	36.1 (97.0)	35.6 (96.1)	38.7 (101.7)	41.9 (107.4)	40.9 (105.6)	33.1 (91.6)	27.7 (81.9)	17.9 (64.2)	41.9 (107.4)
Mean daily maximum °C (°F)	8.9 (48.0)	12.0 (53.6)	16.9 (62.4)	22.2 (72.0)	25.6 (78.1)	28.0 (82.4)	32.0 (89.6)	32.3 (90.1)	27.0 (80.6)	20.6 (69.1)	16.0 (60.8)	10.2 (50.4)	21.0 (69.8)
Daily mean °C (°F)	6.7 (44.1)	9.0 (48.2)	13.2 (55.8)	18.0 (64.4)	21.4 (70.5)	24.1 (75.4)	27.6 (81.7)	27.6 (81.7)	23.1 (73.6)	17.7 (63.9)	13.2 (55.8)	8.0 (46.4)	17.5 (63.5)
Mean daily minimum °C (°F)	5.1 (41.2)	7.1 (44.8)	10.6 (51.1)	15.0 (59.0)	18.4 (65.1)	21.3 (70.3)	24.2 (75.6)	24.1 (75.4)	20.4 (68.7)	15.7 (60.3)	11.4 (52.5)	6.5 (43.7)	15.0 (59.0)
Record low °C (°F)	−7.4 (18.7)	0.2 (32.4)	0.0 (32.0)	4.9 (40.8)	9.6 (49.3)	14.0 (57.2)	18.2 (64.8)	17.4 (63.3)	13.2 (55.8)	6.2 (43.2)	2.6 (36.7)	−2.8 (27.0)	−7.4 (18.7)
Average precipitation mm (inches)	19.6 (0.77)	22.6 (0.89)	55.2 (2.17)	101.2 (3.98)	154.8 (6.09)	205.6 (8.09)	167.4 (6.59)	130.9 (5.15)	129.3 (5.09)	104.8 (4.13)	52.4 (2.06)	24.4 (0.96)	1,168.2 (45.97)
Average precipitation days (≥ 0.1 mm)	9.9	9.4	12.0	14.1	16.5	16.2	12.3	10.9	13.0	16.7	11.9	11.2	154.1
Average snowy days	1.0	0.4	0	0	0	0	0	0	0	0	0	0.2	1.6
Average relative humidity (%)	83	79	75	76	82	75	72	79	85	84	85	79	80
Mean monthly sunshine hours	35.9	45.5	85.8	116.9	126	112	195.8	208.4	127.7	70.4	59.4	34.9	1,218.7
Percentage possible sunshine	11	14	23	30	30	27	46	51	35	20	19	11	26
Source: China Meteorological Administrationall-time extreme temperatureall-time January high

Climate data for NE Chongqing (Wushan County), elevation 276 m (906 ft), (1991–2020 normals, extremes 1981–2010)
Month	Jan	Feb	Mar	Apr	May	Jun	Jul	Aug	Sep	Oct	Nov	Dec	Year
Record high °C (°F)	21.8 (71.2)	27.5 (81.5)	34.3 (93.7)	37.5 (99.5)	40.8 (105.4)	41.9 (107.4)	42.1 (107.8)	42.8 (109.0)	42.2 (108.0)	35.5 (95.9)	26.4 (79.5)	20.7 (69.3)	42.8 (109.0)
Mean daily maximum °C (°F)	10.9 (51.6)	13.6 (56.5)	18.6 (65.5)	24.3 (75.7)	27.9 (82.2)	31.3 (88.3)	34.1 (93.4)	34.3 (93.7)	29.7 (85.5)	23.6 (74.5)	18.3 (64.9)	12.4 (54.3)	23.2 (73.8)
Daily mean °C (°F)	7.5 (45.5)	9.7 (49.5)	13.6 (56.5)	18.8 (65.8)	22.5 (72.5)	26 (79)	28.6 (83.5)	28.5 (83.3)	24.6 (76.3)	19.1 (66.4)	14.3 (57.7)	9.2 (48.6)	18.5 (65.4)
Mean daily minimum °C (°F)	5.0 (41.0)	7.0 (44.6)	10.0 (50.0)	14.8 (58.6)	18.7 (65.7)	22.2 (72.0)	24.7 (76.5)	24.5 (76.1)	21.1 (70.0)	16.1 (61.0)	11.5 (52.7)	6.9 (44.4)	15.2 (59.4)
Record low °C (°F)	−2.1 (28.2)	−0.2 (31.6)	1.6 (34.9)	3.4 (38.1)	11.4 (52.5)	15.5 (59.9)	18.6 (65.5)	17.2 (63.0)	13.1 (55.6)	5.8 (42.4)	3.1 (37.6)	−3.4 (25.9)	−3.4 (25.9)
Average precipitation mm (inches)	10.9 (0.43)	24.9 (0.98)	42.6 (1.68)	87.5 (3.44)	142.2 (5.60)	143.4 (5.65)	166.7 (6.56)	132.4 (5.21)	108 (4.3)	86.2 (3.39)	46.9 (1.85)	14.9 (0.59)	1,006.6 (39.68)
Average precipitation days (≥ 0.1 mm)	5.4	6.4	10.3	13.4	14.4	12.9	13.0	11.0	10.7	12.3	9.1	6.9	125.8
Average snowy days	1.5	0.5	0.2	0	0	0	0	0	0	0	0	0.3	2.5
Average relative humidity (%)	65	63	63	66	70	71	71	67	68	72	71	69	68
Mean monthly sunshine hours	74.1	71.9	111.9	133.7	144.4	156.7	194.1	202.6	147.8	117.1	101.7	76.5	1,532.5
Percentage possible sunshine	23	23	30	34	34	37	45	50	40	34	32	24	34
Source: China Meteorological Administration

== Cityscape ==
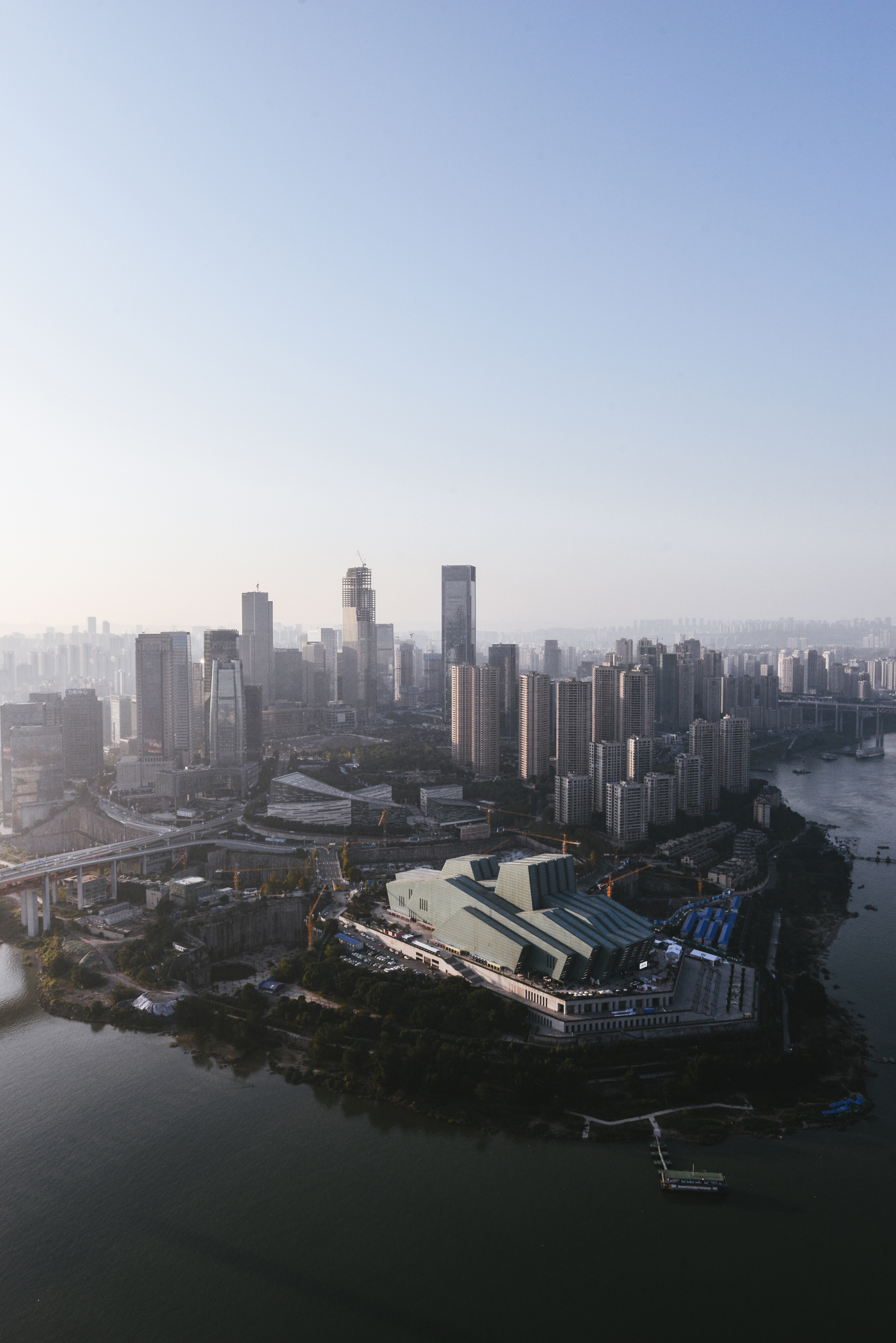
Jiangbeizui CBD from above, taken in 2018

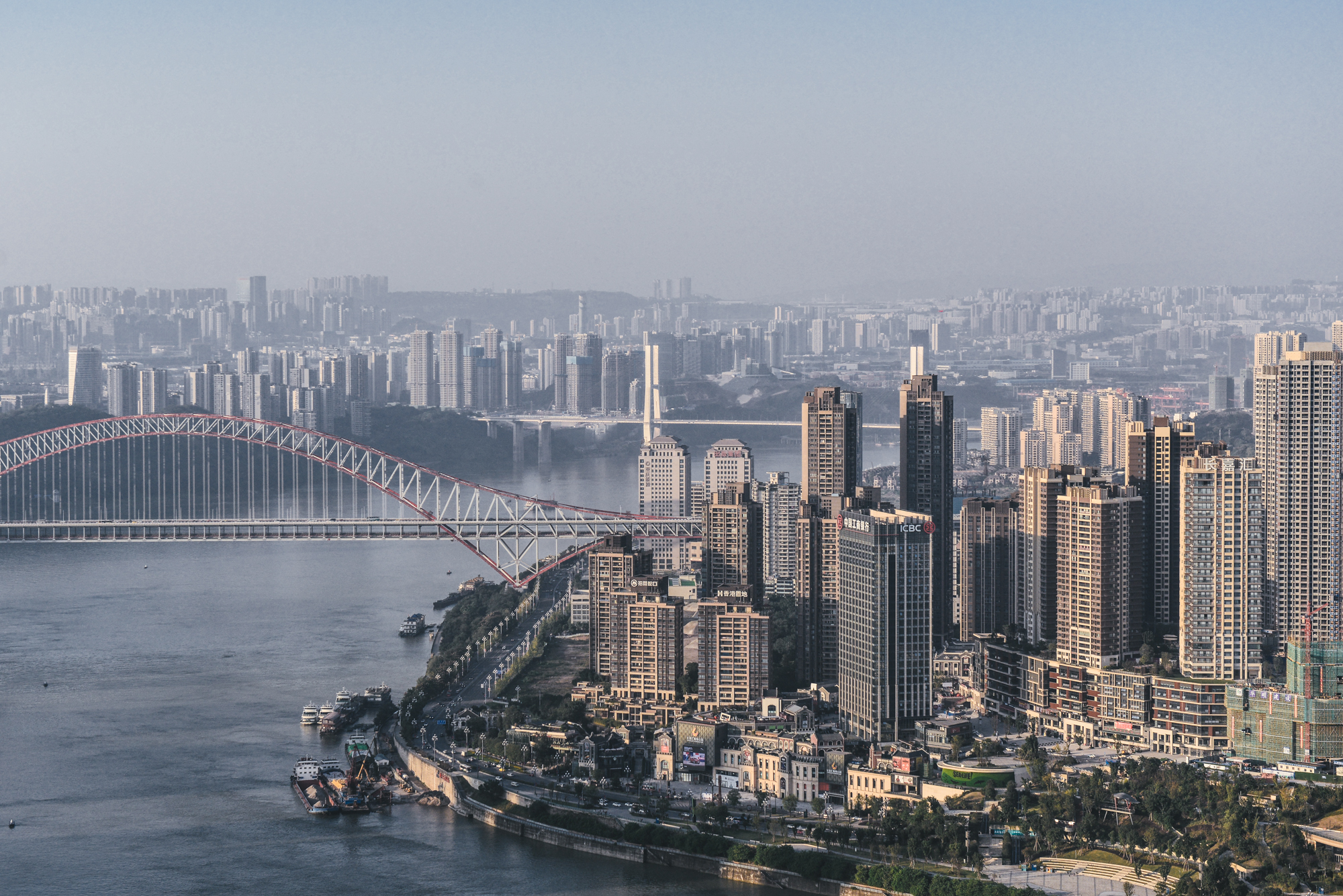
Chaotianmen Bridge connects Jiangbei District with Nan'an District of Chongqing, taken in 2018.

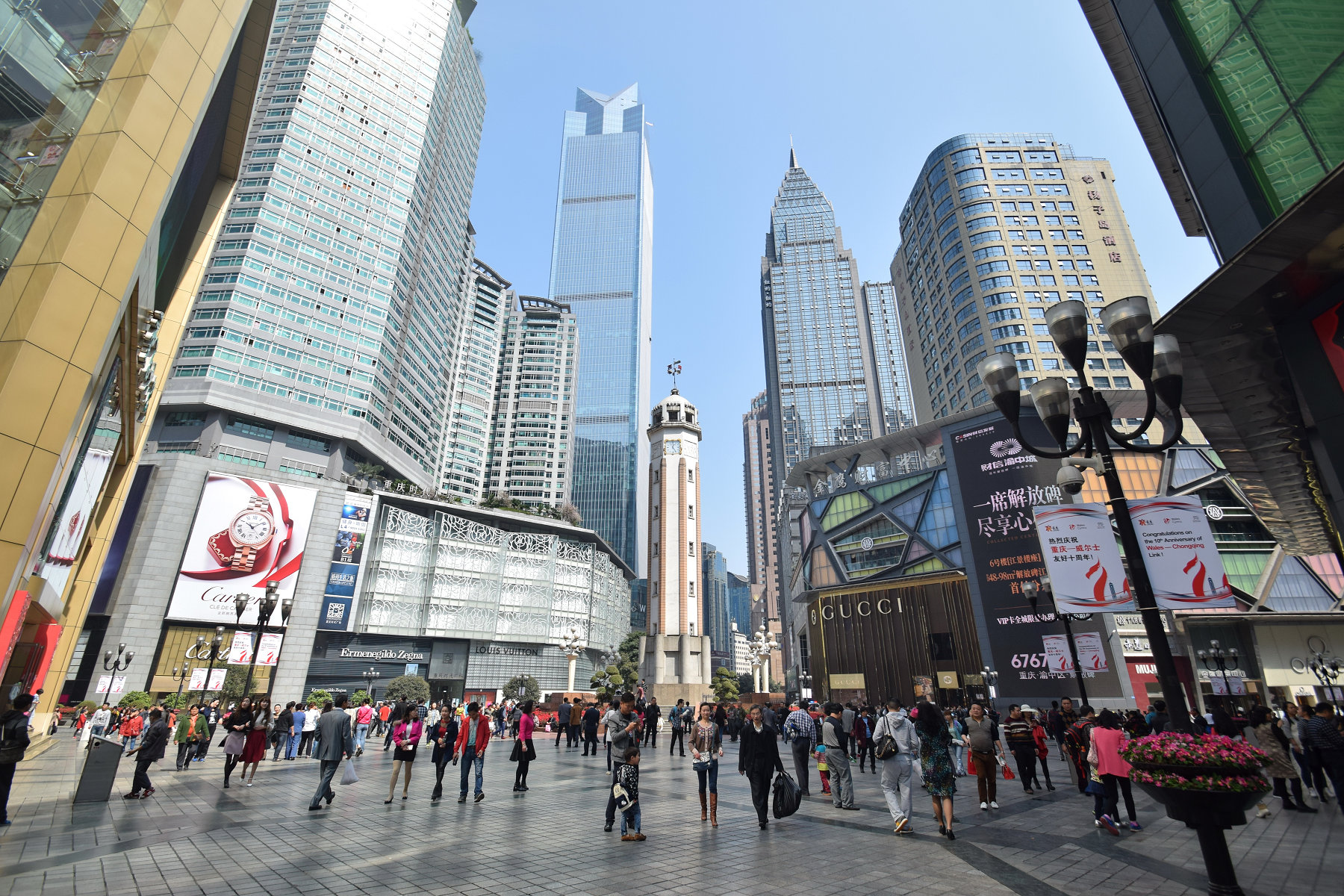
Jiefangbei (解放碑; 'People's Liberation Monument') is a World War II victory monument.

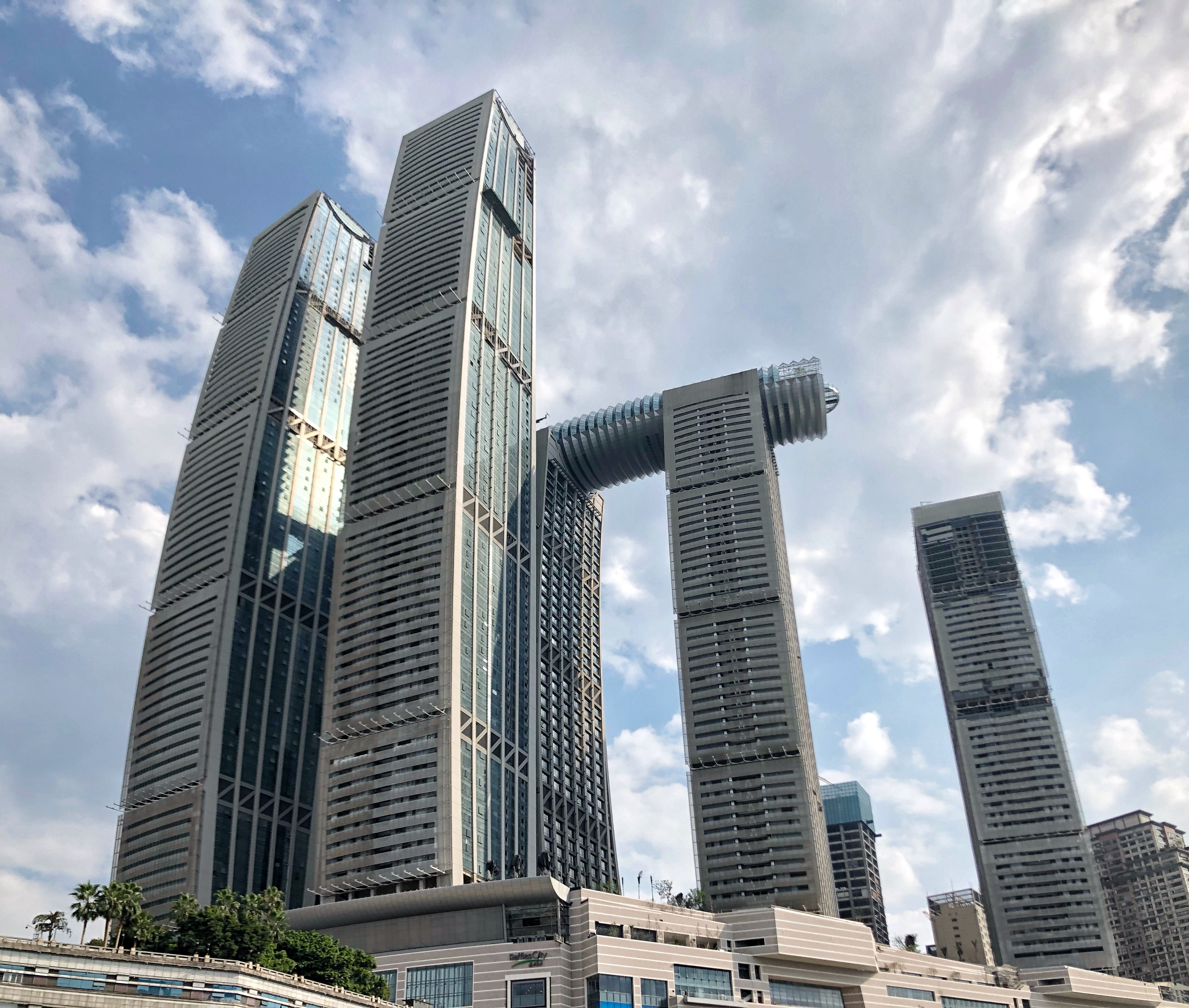
Raffles City Chongqing, sitting in the confluence of Yangtze and Jialing River

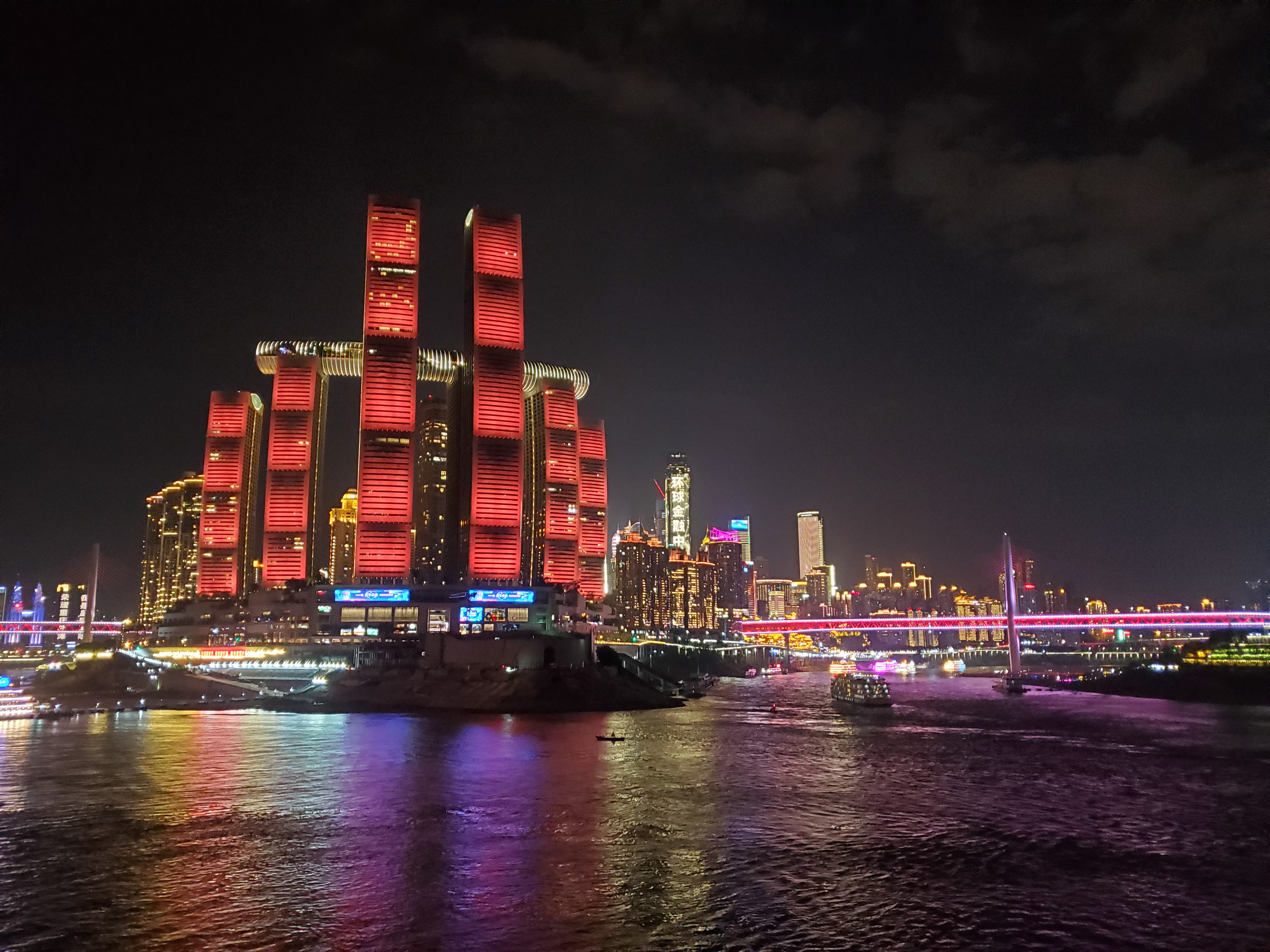
Raffles City Chongqing at Night

== Politics ==
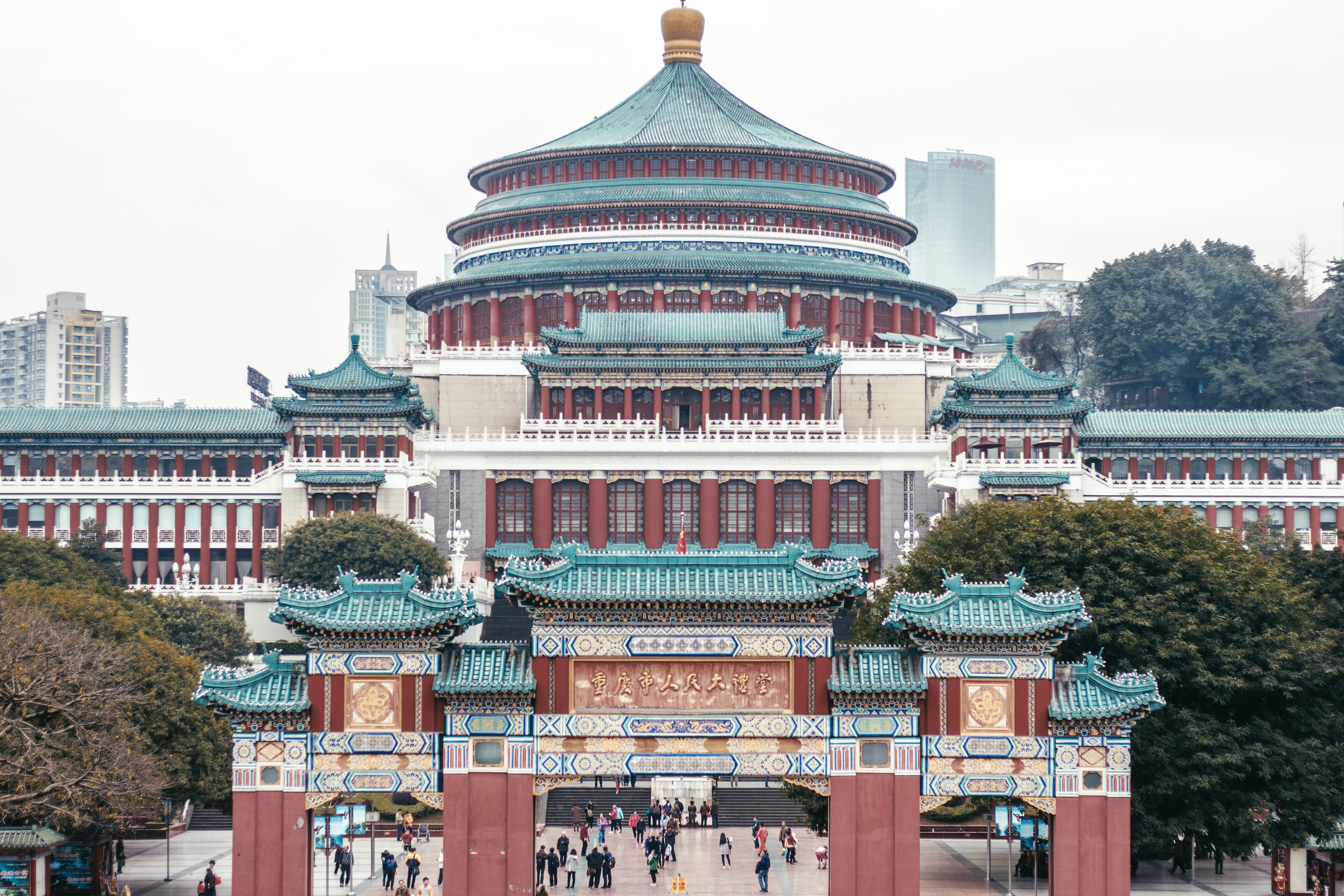
The Great Hall of the People serves as the venue for major political conferences in Chongqing.

Since 1997, Chongqing has been a direct-controlled municipality in the Chinese administrative structure, making it a provincial-level division with commensurate political importance. The municipality's leader is Secretary of the Municipal Committee of the Chinese Communist Party, which, since 2007, has also held a seat on the Politburo of the Chinese Communist Party, the country's second highest governing council. Under the USSR-inspired nomenklatura system of appointments, individuals are appointed to the position by the central leadership of the CCP and bestowed with an official position based on seniority and adherence to party orthodoxy, usually given to an individual with prior regional experience elsewhere in China and nearly never a native of Chongqing. Notable individuals who have held the municipal Party Secretary position include He Guoqiang, Wang Yang, Bo Xilai, Zhang Dejiang, and Sun Zhengcai, the latter three were Politburo members during their term as party chief. The party chief heads the municipal party standing committee, the de facto top governing council of the municipality. The standing committee is typically composed of 13 individuals, which includes the party chiefs of important subdivisions and other leading figures in the local party and government organization, as well as one military representative.

The municipal People's Government serves as the day-to-day administrative authority, and is headed by the mayor, who is assisted by numerous vice mayors and mayoral assistants. Each vice mayor is given jurisdiction over specific municipal departments. The mayor is the second-highest-ranking official in the municipality. The mayor usually represents the city when foreign guests visit.

The municipality also has a Municipal People's Congress, theoretically elected by lower level People's Congresses. The People's Congress nominally appoints the mayor and approves the nominations of other government officials. The People's Congress, like those of other provincial jurisdictions, is generally seen as a symbolic body. It convenes in full once a year to approve party-sponsored resolutions and local regulations and duly confirm party-approved appointments. On occasion, the People's Congress can be a venue of discussion on municipal issues, although this is dependent on the actions of individual delegates. The municipal People's Congress is headed by a former municipal official, usually in their late fifties or sixties, with a lengthy prior political career in Chongqing. The municipal Political Consultative Conference (zhengxie) meets at around the same time as the People's Congress. Its role is to advise on political issues. The zhengxie is headed by a leader who is typically a former municipal or regional official with a lengthy career in the party and government bureaucracy.

=== Military ===
Chongqing was the wartime capital of China during the Second Sino-Japanese War (i.e., World War II), and from 1937 to 1945, the seat of administration for the Republic of China's government before its departure to Nanjing and then Taiwan. After the eventual defeat at the Battle of Wuhan, General Chiang Kai-shek and the army were forced to use it as their base of resistance from 1938 onwards. It also contains a military museum named after the Chinese Korean War hero Qiu Shaoyun.

Chongqing used to be the headquarters of the 13th Group Army of the People's Liberation Army, one of the two group armies that formerly comprised the Chengdu Military Region, which was reorganized into the Western Theater Command in 2016.

=== Administrative divisions ===
Chongqing is the largest of the four direct-controlled municipalities of the People's Republic of China. The municipality is divided into 37 subdivisions (3 were abolished in 1997. Wansheng and Shuangqiao districts were abolished in October 2011. Jiangbei and Yubei districts were abolished in November 2025 along with the establishment of the formal Liangjiang New Area), consisting of 25 districts, 8 counties, and 4 autonomous counties. The boundaries of Chongqing municipality reach much farther into the city's hinterland than the boundaries of the other three provincial level municipalities (Beijing, Shanghai and Tianjin), and much of its administrative area, which spans over 80,000 square kilometers (30,900 sq mi), is rural. At the end of 2018, the total population was 31.02 million. As of 2022, Chongqing is the largest Chinese city by urban population, with a population of 22.80 million.

Administrative divisions of Chongqing
Division code	Division	Area in km^{2}	Total population 2010	Urban area population 2010	Seat	Postal code	Subdivisions					
Division code	Division	Area in km^{2}	Total population 2010	Urban area population 2010	Seat	Postal code	Subdistricts	Towns	Townships (Note: Including other township related subdivisions.)	Ethnic townships	Residential communities	Villages
500000	Chongqing	82403	28,846,170	15295803	Yuzhong	400000	181	567	233	14	2324	5235
500101	Wanzhou	3457	1,563,050	859,662	Chenjiaba Subdistrict	404000	11	29	10	2	187	448
500102	Fuling	2946	1,066,714	595,224	Lizhi Subdistrict	408000	8	12	6		108	310
500103	Yuzhong	23	630,090		Qixinggang Subdistrict	400000	12				78	
500104	Dadukou	102	301,042	280,512	Xinshancun Subdistrict	400000	5	2			48	32
500106	Shapingba	396	1,000,013	900,568	Qinjiagang Subdistrict	400000	18	8			140	86
500107	Jiulongpo	431	1,084,419	939,349	Yangjiaping Subdistrict	400000	7	11			107	105
500108	Nan'an	263	759,570	683,717	Tianwen Subdistrict	400000	7	7			85	61
500109	Beibei	754	680,360	501,822	Beiwenquan Subdistrict	400700	5	12			63	117
500110	Qijiang	2747	1,056,817	513,935	Gunan Subdistrict	400800	5	25			99	365
500111	Dazu	1433	721,359	315,183	Tangxiang Subdistrict	400900	3	24			103	197
500113	Banan	1834	918,692	669,269	Longzhouwan Subdistrict	401300	8	14			87	198
500114	Qianjiang	2397	445,012	173,997	Chengxi Subdistrict	409700	6	12	12		80	138
500115	Changshou	1423	770,009	408,261	Fengcheng Subdistrict	401200	4	14			31	223
500116	Jiangjin	3200	1,233,149	686,189	Jijiang Subdistrict	402200	4	24			85	180
500117	Hechuan	2356	1,293,028	721,753	Nanjin Street Subdistrict	401500	7	23			61	327
500118	Yongchuan	1576	1,024,708	582,769	Zhongshan Road Subdistrict	402100	7	16			52	208
500119	Nanchuan	2602	534,329	255,045	Dongcheng Subdistrict	408400	3	15	15		58	185
500120	Bishan	912	586,034	246,425	Bicheng Subdistrict	402700	6	9			43	142
500151	Tongliang	1342	600,086	248,962	Bachuan Subdistrict	402500	3	25			57	269
500152	Tongnan	1585	639,985	247,084	Guilin Subdistrict	402600	2	20			21	281
500153	Rongchang	1079	661,253	271,232	Changyuan Subdistrict	402400	6	15			75	92
500154	Kaizhou	3959	1,160,336	416,415	Hanfeng Subdistrict	405400	7	26	7		78	435
500155	Liangping	1890	687,525	235,753	Liangshan Subdistrict	405200	2	26	7		33	310
500156	Wulong	2872	351,038	115,823	Gangkou town	408500		12	10	4	24	184
500157	Liangjiang	1360	3,500,000 (Year 2025)		Jinshan Subdistrict		31	11				
500229	Chengkou Co.	3286	192,967	49,039	Gecheng Subdistrict	405900	2	6	17		22	184
500230	Fengdu Co.	2896	649,182	224,003	Sanhe Subdistrict	408200	2	23	5		53	277
500231	Dianjiang Co.	1518	704,458	241,424	Guixi Subdistrict	408300	2	23	2		62	236
500233	Zhong Co.	2184	751,424	247,406	Zhongzhou town	404300		22	5	1	49	317
500235	Yunyang Co.	3634	912,912	293,636	Shuangjiang Subdistrict	404500	4	22	15	1	87	391
500236	Fengjie Co.	4087	834,259	269,302	Yong'an town	404600		19	8	4	54	332
500237	Wushan Co.	2958	495,072	148,597	Gaotang Subdistrict	404700		11	12	2	30	308
500238	Wuxi Co.	4030	414,073	105,111	Baichang Subdistrict	405800	2	15	16		38	292
500240	Shizhu Co.	3013	415,050	134,173	Nanbin town	409100		17	15		29	213
500241	Xiushan Co.	2450	501,590	150,566	Zhonghe Subdistrict	409900		14	18		59	208
500242	Youyang Co.	5173	578,058	137,635	Taohuayuan town	409800		15	23		8	270
500243	Pengshui Co.	3903	545,094	137,409	Hanjia Subdistrict	409600		11	28		55	241

Divisions in Chinese and varieties of romanizations
English	Chinese	Hanyu Pinyin	Sichuanese Pinyin
Chongqing Municipality	重庆市	Chóngqìng Shì	cong^{2} qin^{4} si^{4}
Wanzhou District	万州区	Wànzhōu Qū	wan^{4} zou^{2} qu^{1}
Fuling District	涪陵区	Fúlíng Qū	
Yuzhong District	渝中区	Yúzhōng Qū	yu^{2} zong^{1} qu^{1}
Dadukou District	大渡口区	Dàdùkǒu Qū	da^{4} du^{4} kou^{3} qu^{1}
Jiangbei District	江北区	Jiāngběi Qū	jiang^{1} be^{2} qu^{1}
Shapingba District	沙坪坝区	Shāpíngbà Qū	sa^{1} pin^{2} ba^{4} qu^{1}
Jiulongpo District	九龙坡区	Jiǔlóngpō Qū	
Nan'an District	南岸区	Nán'àn Qū	lan^{2} ngan^{4} qu^{1}
Beibei District	北碚区	Běibèi Qū	
Qijiang District	綦江区	Qíjiāng Qū	
Dazu District	大足区	Dàzú Qū	
Yubei District	渝北区	Yúběi Qū	yu^{2} be^{2} qu^{1}
Banan District	巴南区	Bānán Qū	ba^{1} lan^{2} qu^{1}
Qianjiang District	黔江区	Qiánjiāng Qū	
Changshou District	长寿区	Chángshòu Qū	
Jiangjin District	江津区	Jiāngjīn Qū	jiang^{1} jin^{1} qu^{1}
Hechuan District	合川区	Héchuān Qū	ho^{2} cuan^{1} qu^{1}
Yongchuan District	永川区	Yǒngchuān Qū	yun^{3} cuan^{1} qu^{1}
Nanchuan District	南川区	Nánchuān Qū	lan^{2} cuan^{1} qu^{1}
Bishan District	璧山区	Bìshān Qū	
Tongliang District	铜梁区	Tóngliáng Qū	
Tongnan District	潼南区	Tóngnán Qū	
Rongchang District	荣昌区	Róngchāng Qū	
Kaizhou District	开州区	Kāizhōu Qū	kai^{1} zou^{1} qu^{1}
Liangping District	梁平区	Liángpíng Qū	
Wulong District	武隆区	Wǔlóng Qū	wu^{3} nong^{2} qu^{1}
Liangjiang New Area	两江新区	Liǎngjiāng Xīnqū	
Chengkou County	城口县	Chéngkǒu Xiàn	cen^{2} kou^{3} xian^{3}
Fengdu County	丰都县	Fēngdū Xiàn	
Dianjiang County	垫江县	Diànjiāng Xiàn	
Zhong County	忠县	Zhōngxiàn	zong^{1} xian^{3}
Yunyang County	云阳县	Yúnyáng Xiàn	yun^{2} yang^{2} xian^{3}
Fengjie County	奉节县	Fèngjié Xiàn	
Wushan County	巫山县	Wūshān Xiàn	
Wuxi County	巫溪县	Wūxī Xiàn	
Shizhu Tujia Autonomous County	石柱土家族自治县	Shízhù Tǔjiāzú Zìzhìxiàn	
Xiushan Tujia and Miao Autonomous County	秀山土家族苗族自治县	Xiùshān Tǔjiāzú Miáozú Zìzhìxiàn	
Youyang Tujia and Miao Autonomous County	酉阳土家族苗族自治县	Yǒuyáng Tǔjiāzú Miáozú Zìzhìxiàn	
Pengshui Miao and Tujia Autonomous County	彭水苗族土家族自治县	Péngshuǐ Miáozú Tǔjiāzú Zìzhìxiàn	

Population by urban areas of districts
#	City	Urban area	District area	Census date
1	Chongqing (Note: Chongqing core districts are consist of nine districts: Yuzhong, Dadukou, Jiangbei, Shapingba, Jiulongpo, Nan'an, Beibei, Yubei, & Banan.)	6,263,790	7,457,599	1 November 2010
2	Wanzhou	859,662	1,563,050	1 November 2010
3	Hechuan	721,753	1,293,028	1 November 2010
4	Jiangjin	686,189	1,233,149	1 November 2010
5	Fuling	595,224	1,066,714	1 November 2010
6	Yongchuan	582,769	1,024,708	1 November 2010
7	Qijiang (Note: Wansheng District & Qijiang County currently known as Qijiang District after census.)	513,935	1,056,817	1 November 2010
(8)	Kaizhou (Note: Kaizhou County is currently known as Kaizhou District after census.)	416,415	1,160,336	1 November 2010
9	Changshou	408,261	770,009	1 November 2010
10	Dazu (Note: Shuangqiao District & Dazu County currently known as Dazu District after census.)	315,183	721,359	1 November 2010
(11)	Rongchang (Note: Rongchang County is currently known as Rongchang District after census.)	271,232	661,253	1 November 2010
12	Nanchuan	255,045	534,329	1 November 2010
(13)	Tongliang (Note: Tongliang County is currently known as Tongliang District after census.)	248,962	600,086	1 November 2010
(14)	Tongnan (Note: Tongnan County is currently known as Tongnan District after census.)	247,084	639,985	1 November 2010
(15)	Bishan (Note: Bishan County is currently known as Bishan District after census.)	246,425	586,034	1 November 2010
(16)	Liangping (Note: Liangping County is currently known as Liangping District after census.)	235,753	687,525	1 November 2010
17	Qianjiang	173,997	445,012	1 November 2010
(18)	Wulong (Note: Wulong County is currently known as Wulong District after census.)	115,823	351,038	1 November 2010
(19)	Liangjiang (Note: Established on 5 May 2010 as a state-level new area. Became a formal district on 6 November 2025.)			

Districts
Pinyin name	Previous association^{a}
Banan	Chongqing
Beibei	Chongqing
Bishan	Chongqing
Changshou	Chongqing
Dadukou	Chongqing
Dazu	Chongqing
Fuling	Fuling
Hechuan	Chongqing
Jiangjin	Chongqing
Jiulongpo	Chongqing
Kaizhou	Wanxian
Liangjiang	Chongqing
Liangping	Wanxian
Nan'an	Chongqing
Nanchuan	Fuling
Qianjiang	Qianjiang
Shapingba	Chongqing
Tongliang	Chongqing
Tongnan	Chongqing
Qijiang	Chongqing
Rongchang	Chongqing
Wanzhou	Wanxian
Wulong	Fuling
Yongchuan	Chongqing
Yuzhong	Chongqing

Counties
Pinyin name	Previous association^{a}
Chengkou	Wanxian
Dianjiang	Fuling
Fengdu	Fuling
Fengjie	Wanxian
Wushan	Wanxian
Wuxi	Wanxian
Yunyang	Wanxian
Zhong	Wanxian

Autonomous counties
Pinyin name	Previous association^{a}
Pengshui	Qianjiang
Shizhu	Qianjiang
Xiushan	Qianjiang
Youyang	Qianjiang

^{a} Indicates with which district the division was associated below prior to the merging of Chongqing, Fuling, Wanxian (now Wanzhou) and Qianjiang in 1997.

==== Central Chongqing ====
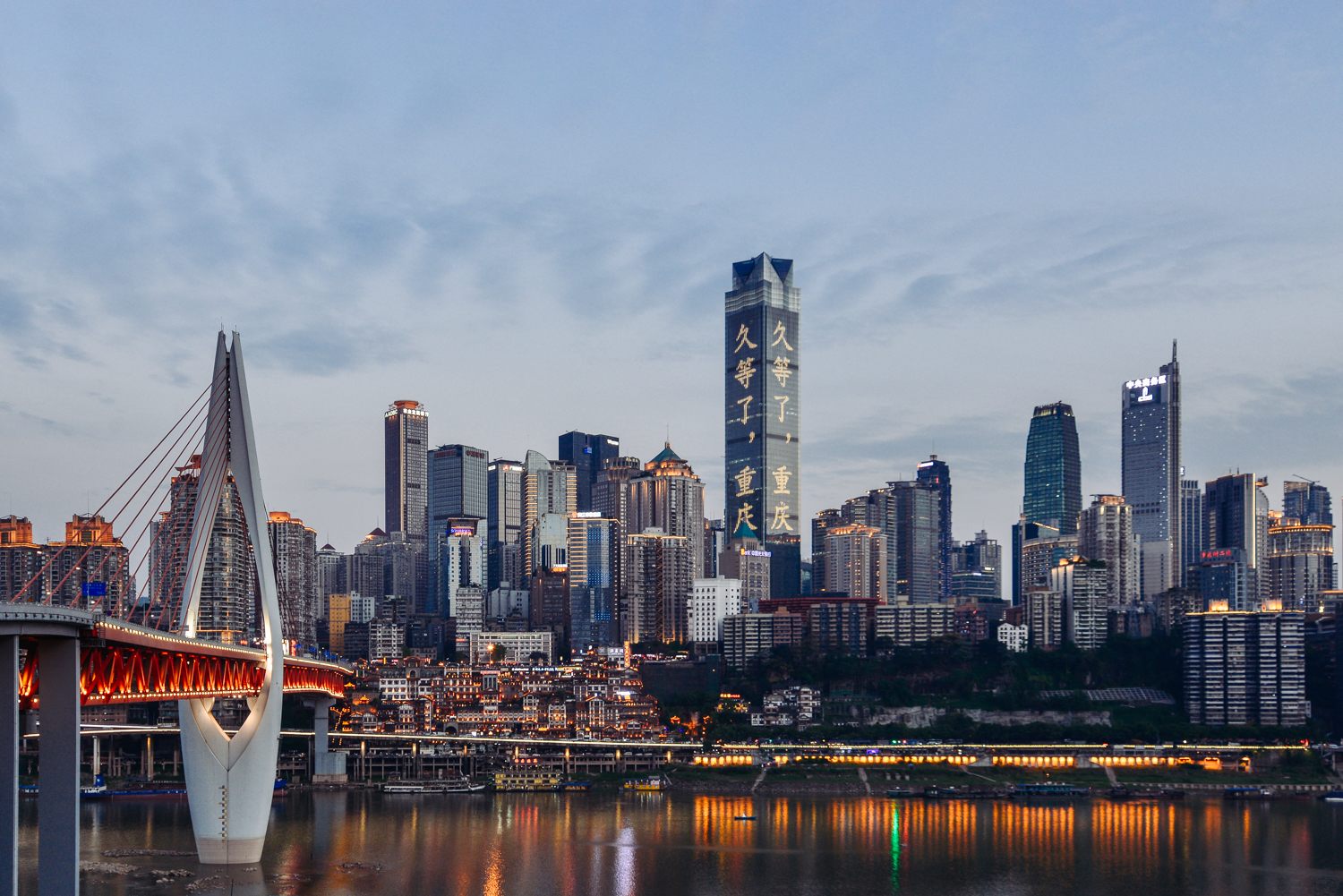
Jiefangbei CBD, Yuzhong Peninsula of Chongqing at dusk

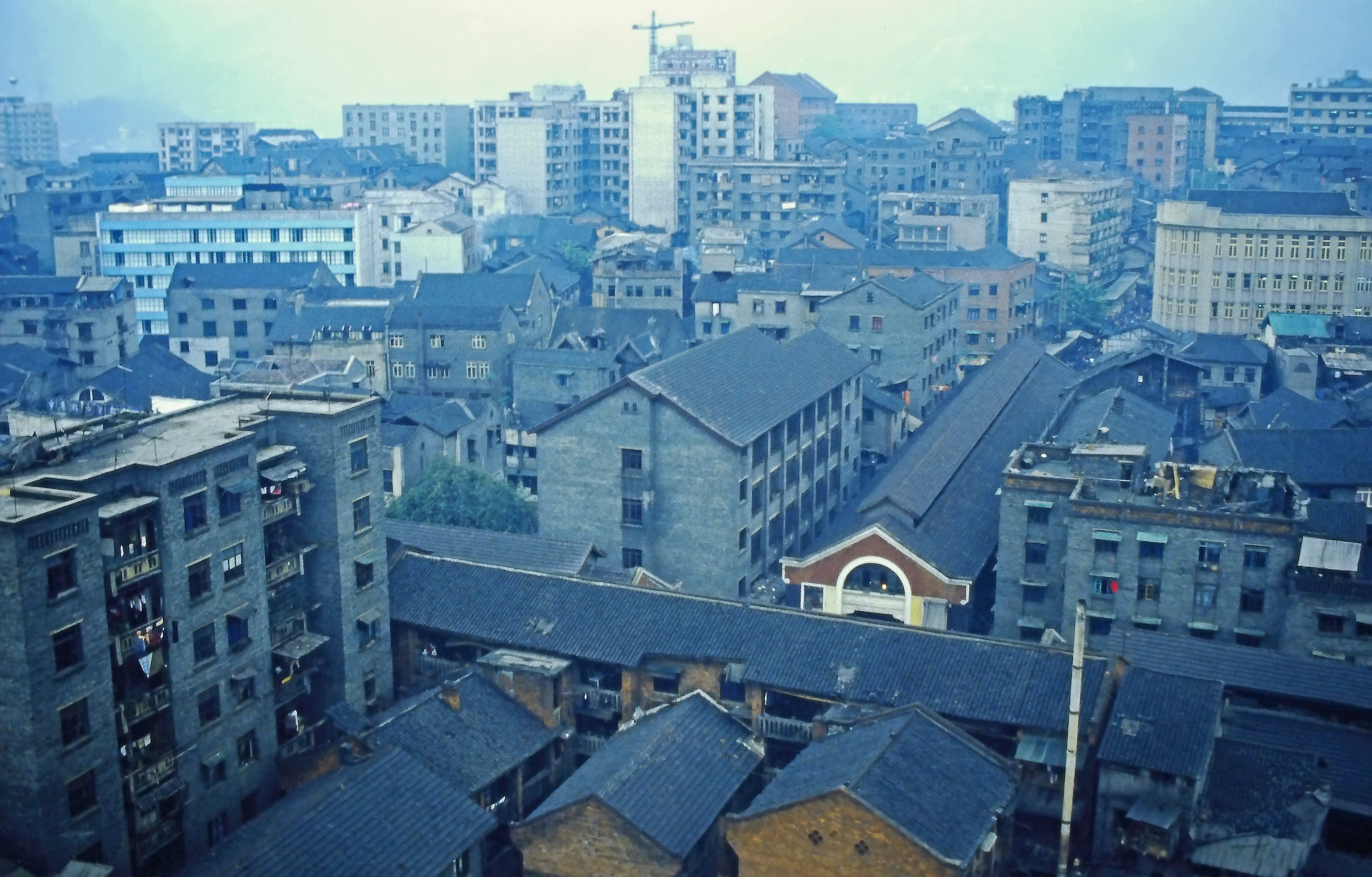
Central Chongqing in 1988.

The main urban area of Chongqing city (重庆主城区) spans approximately 5,473 square kilometers (2,113 sq mi), and includes the following nine districts:

- Yuzhong District (渝中区, literally "Central Chongqing District"), the central and most densely populated district, where government and international business offices and the city's best shopping are located in the district's Jiefangbei CBD area. Yuzhong is located on the peninsula surrounded by Eling Hill, Yangtze River and Jialing River.
- Abolished Jiangbei District (江北区, literally "North of the River District"), located to the north of Jialing River.
- Shapingba District (沙坪坝区), roughly located between Jialing River and Zhongliang Mountain.
- Jiulongpo District (九龙坡区), roughly located between Yangtze River and Zhongliang Mountain.
- Nan'an District (南岸区, literally "Southern Bank District"), located on the south side of Yangtze River.
- Dadukou District (大渡口区)
- Banan District (巴南区, literally "Southern of Ba District"). Previously called Ba County, and changed to the current name in 1994.
- Abolished Yubei District (渝北区, or "Northern Chongqing District"). Previously called Jiangbei County, and changed into the current name in 1994.
- Beibei District (北碚区), a satellite district northwest of Chongqing.
- Liangjiang New Area (两江新区, literally "Two Rivers New Area"), a state-level new area established on 5 May 2010. It became a formal district on 6 November 2025, consisting of the former Jiangbei District, part of the former Yubei District, and part of Beibei District.

== Demographics ==
=== Population ===
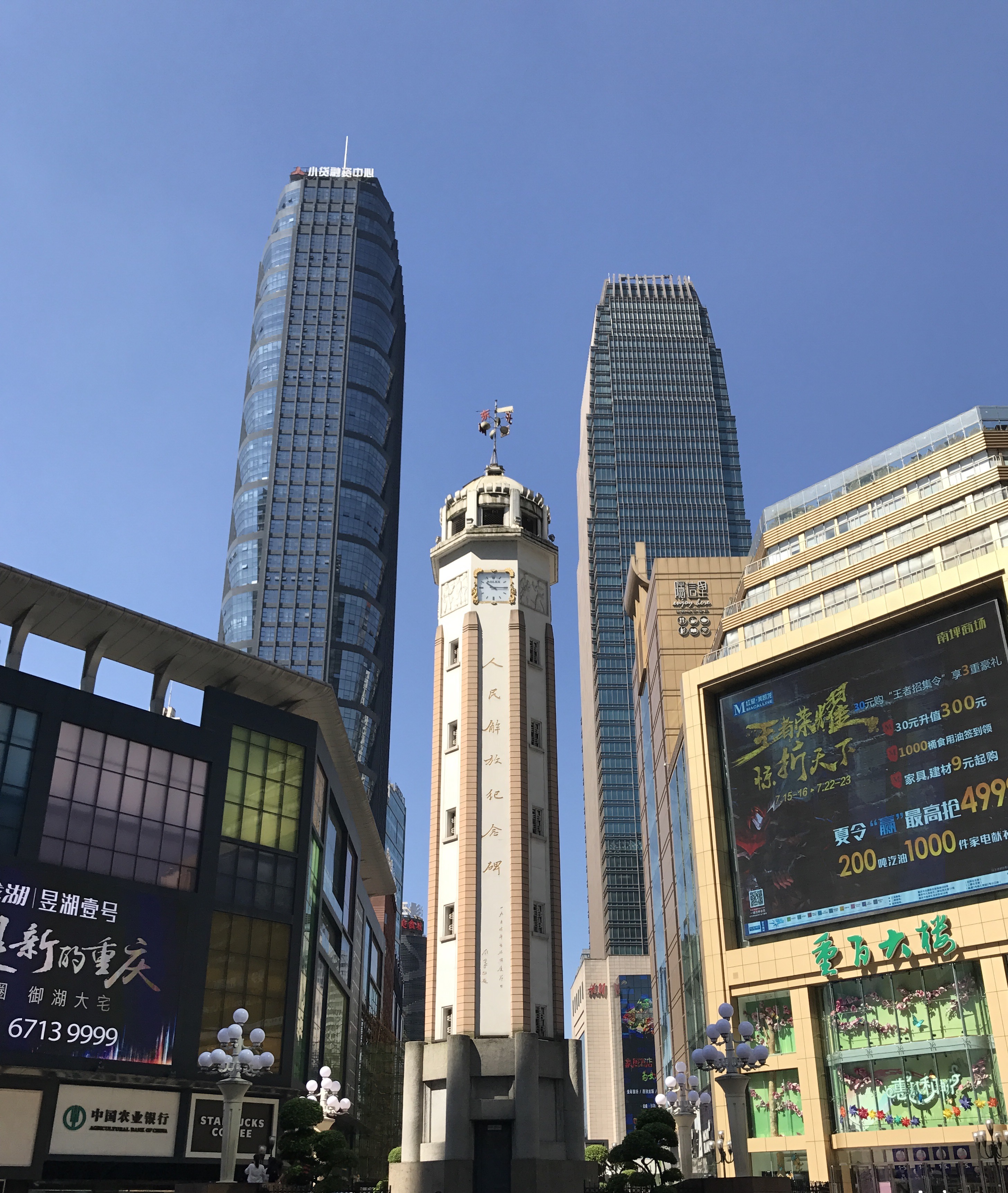
Jiefangbei (People's Liberation Monument), the landmark and center of Chongqing

Historical population
Year	Pop.	±%
1949	1,003,000	—
1979	6,301,000	+528.2%
1983	13,890,000	+120.4%
1996	15,297,000	+10.1%
1997*	28,753,000	+88.0%
2000	28,488,200	−0.9%
2005	27,980,000	−1.8%
2008	28,390,000	+1.5%
2012	28,846,170	+1.6%
2013	29,700,000	+3.0%
2014	29,914,000	+0.7%
2015	30,170,000	+0.9%
*Population size in 1997 was affected by expansion of administrative divisions.

According to the 2020 national census, Chongqing has a population of 32,054,159, accounting for around 2.27% of the national total. This makes it the most populous city proper in the world. As of 2010, the metropolitan area encompassing the central urban area was estimated by the OECD to have, a population of 17 million.

In 2020, Chongqing surpassed Shanghai as China's largest municipality by urban population. As of 2021, 70.4% of Chongqing's population is estimated to be urban, and 29.6% rural. As of 2024, Chongqing had an urban population of 23.01 million.

The Census also lists the male percentage as 50.55% and the female percentage as 49.55%. In terms of age distribution, of the total population, 15.91% were age 0–14, 62.22% were 15–64, and 21.87% were 65 and over. Of the population's highest education level achieved, 15.41% were college, 15.96% were high school, 30.58% were middle school, and 29.89% were elementary school.

=== Religion ===
Religion in Chongqing (Note: The data was collected by the Chinese General Social Survey (CGSS) of 2009 and by the Chinese Spiritual Life Survey (CSLS) of 2007, reported and assembled by Xiuhua Wang (2015) in order to confront the proportion of people identifying with two similar social structures: ① Christian churches, and ② folk traditional Chinese religion of the lineage (i.e. people practicing ancestral worship are often classified into lineage "churches" and ancestral shrines). Data for other religions with a significant presence in China (Buddhism, Taoism, folk religious sects, etc.) was not reported by Wang.)
1. Chinese ancestral religion (26.6%)
2. Christianity (1.05%)
3. Other or no religion (Note: This may include: Buddhists; Confucians; Folk religionists; Taoists; Members of folk religious sects; Small minorities of Muslims; And people not bounded to, nor practicing any, institutional or diffuse religion.) (72.3%)

The predominant religions in Chongqing are Chinese folk religions, Taoist traditions and Chinese Buddhism. According to surveys conducted in 2007 and 2009, 26.63% of the population practices Chinese ancestral religion, while 1.05% of the population identifies as Christian.

The reports did not give figures for other types of religion; 72.32% of the population may be either irreligious or involved in worship of nature deities, Buddhism, Confucianism, Taoism, or folk religious sects.

In 2010, there were 9,056 Muslims in Chongqing.

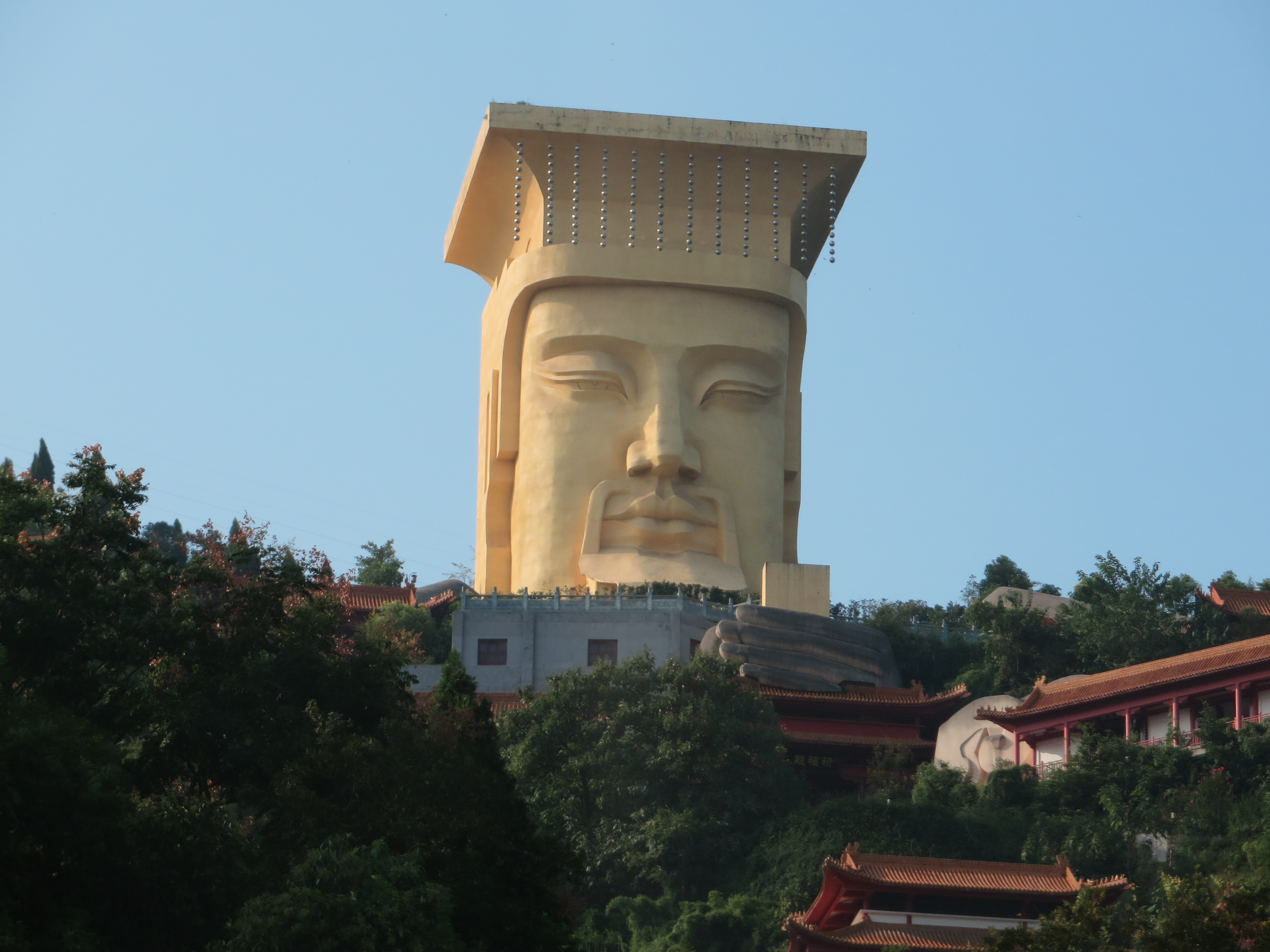
The Jade Emperor at the Fengdu Ghost City

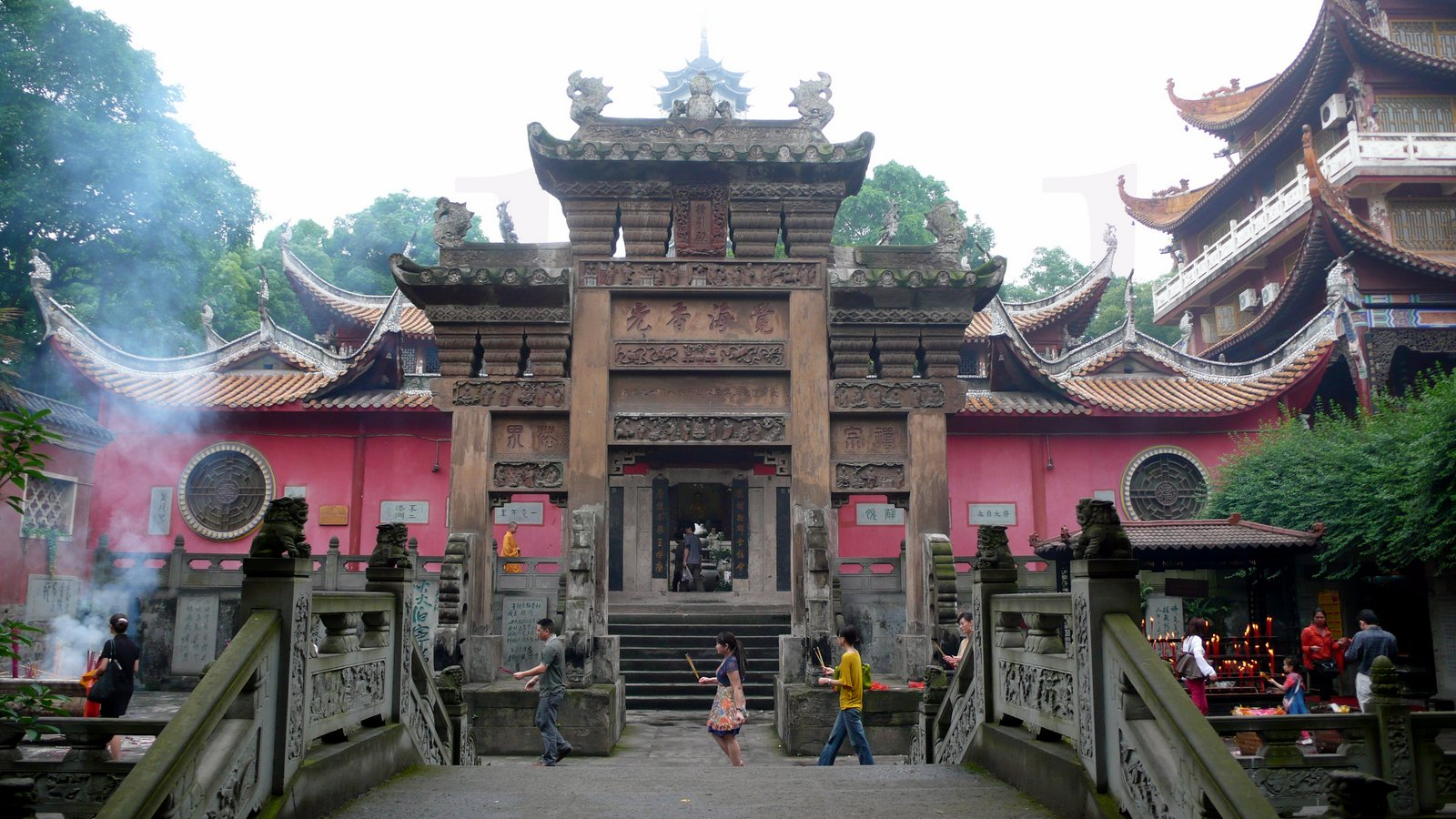
Buddhist temple in Jiulongpo

== Economy ==
Chongqing was a major recipient of China's investment in industrial capacity during the Third Front campaign.

There has been a massive government push to transform Chongqing into the region's economic, trade, and financial center and use the municipality as a platform to open up the country's western interior to further development. Chongqing is facing rapid urbanization. For instance, statistics suggest that new construction added approximately 137,000 square meters (1,470,000 sq ft) daily of usable floor space to satisfy demands for residential, commercial and factory space. Thus, Chongqing was separated from Sichuan province and made into a municipality in its own right on 14 March 1997 in order to accelerate its development and subsequently China's relatively poorer western areas (see China Western Development strategy). By the 2000s the city had become an important industrial area in western China.

As of 2022, Chongqing's nominal GDP was US$433 billion (CN¥ 2.91 trilion), about 2.41% of the country's GDP and ranked 16th among province-level administrative units; the municipality's primary, secondary and tertiary industries were worth CN¥201.21 billion (US$29.92 billion), CN¥1.169 trillion (US$173.86 billion) and CN¥1.542 trillion (US$229.3 billion) respectively. Its nominal GDP per capita was US$13,479 (CN¥90,663) and ranked 10th in the country.

Chongqing has been identified by the Economist Intelligence Unit in the November 2010 Access China White Paper as a member of the CHAMPS (Chongqing, Hefei, Anshan, Maanshan, Pingdingshan and Shenyang), an economic profile of the top 20 emerging cities in China.

Traditionally, due to its geographic inaccessibility, Chongqing and Sichuan have both been important military bases in weapons research and development. Even though Chongqing's industries are diversified, unlike eastern China, its export sector is small due to its relatively disadvantageous inland location. Instead, factories producing local-oriented consumer goods such as processed food, cars, chemicals, textiles, machinery, sports equipment and electronics are common.

Chongqing is China's third largest motor vehicle production center and the largest for motorcycles. In 2007, it had an annual output capacity of 1 million cars and 8.6 million motorcycles. Leading makers of cars and motorbikes includes China's fourth biggest automaker; Changan Automotive Corp and Lifan Hongda Enterprise, as well as Ford Motor Company, with the US car giant having 3 plants in Chongqing. The municipality is also one of China's nine largest iron and steel producers in China as well as one of its three major aluminum producers. Important manufacturers include Chongqing Iron and Steel Company (重庆钢铁股份有限公司) and Southwest Aluminum (西南鋁業), which is Asia's largest aluminum plant.

Agriculture remains significant. Rice and fruits, especially oranges, are the area's main produce.

Natural resources are also abundant with large deposits of coal, natural gas, and more than 40 kinds of minerals such as strontium and manganese. Coal reserves total approximately 4,800,000,000 metric tons (4.7×10^{9} long tons; 5.3×10^{9} short tons). Chuandong Natural Gas Field is China's largest inland gas field with deposits of around 270 billion m^{3} – more than 1/5 of China's total. Has China's largest reserve of strontium (China has the world's 2nd biggest strontium deposit). Manganese is mined in the Xiushan area. Although the mining sector has been denounced as heavily polluting and unsafe. (Note: A survey in 2005 by China's State Environmental Protection Administration (SEPA) found 13 firms in the manganese triangle had breached targets on the release of hexavalent chromium and ammonia-nitrogen – in the worst case, by a factor of 180. The cleanup ordered by SEPA resulted in firms closing and the expenditure of 280 million yuan.) Chongqing is also planned to be the site of a 10 million ton capacity refinery operated by CNPC (parent company of PetroChina) to process imported crude oil from the Sino-Myanmar pipelines. The pipeline itself, though not yet finished, will eventually run from Sittwe (in Myanmar's western coast) through Kunming in Yunnan before reaching Chongqing and it will provide China with fuels sourced from Myanmar, the Middle East and Africa. Recently, there has been a drive to move up the value chain by shifting towards high technology and knowledge intensive industries resulting in new development zones such as the Chongqing New North Zone (CNNZ). Chongqing's local government is hoping through the promotion of favorable economic policies for the electronics and information technology sectors, that it can create a 400 billion RMB high technology manufacturing hub which will surpass its car industry and account for 25% of its exports.

The city has also invested heavily in infrastructure to attract investment. The network of roads and railways connecting Chongqing to the rest of China has been expanded and upgraded reducing logistical costs. Furthermore, the nearby Three Gorges Dam, which is the world's largest, supplies Chongqing with power and allows oceangoing ships to reach Chongqing's Yangtze River port. These infrastructure improvements have led to the arrivals of numerous foreign direct investors (FDI) in industries ranging from car to finance and retailing; such as Ford, Mazda, HSBC, Standard Chartered Bank, Citibank, Deutsche Bank, ANZ Bank, Scotiabank, Wal-Mart, Metro AG and Carrefour, among other multinational corporations.

=== Economic and technological development zones ===
The city includes a number of economic and technological development zones:

- Chongqing Chemical Industrial Park
- Chongqing Economic & Technological Development Zone
- Chongqing Hi-Tech Industry Development Zone
- Chongqing New North Zone (CNNZ)
- Chongqing Export Processing Zone
- Jianqiao Industrial Park (located in Dadukou District)
- Liangjiang New Area
- Liangjiang Cloud Computing Center (the largest of its kind in China)

Chongqing itself is part of the West Triangle Economic Zone, along with Chengdu and Xi'an.

== Education and research ==
As of 2022, Chongqing hosts 70 institutions of higher education (excluding adult colleges), making it the fourth city with the most higher education institutions nationwide and the first city in Western China, which comprises Chongqing, six provinces (Sichuan, Guizhou, Yunnan, Shaanxi, Gansu, and Qinghai), and three autonomous regions (Tibet, Ningxia, and Xinjiang), with a combination of more than 290 million population.

Chongqing is one of the top 35 cities in the world by scientific research outputs as tracked by the Nature Index.

=== Colleges and universities ===
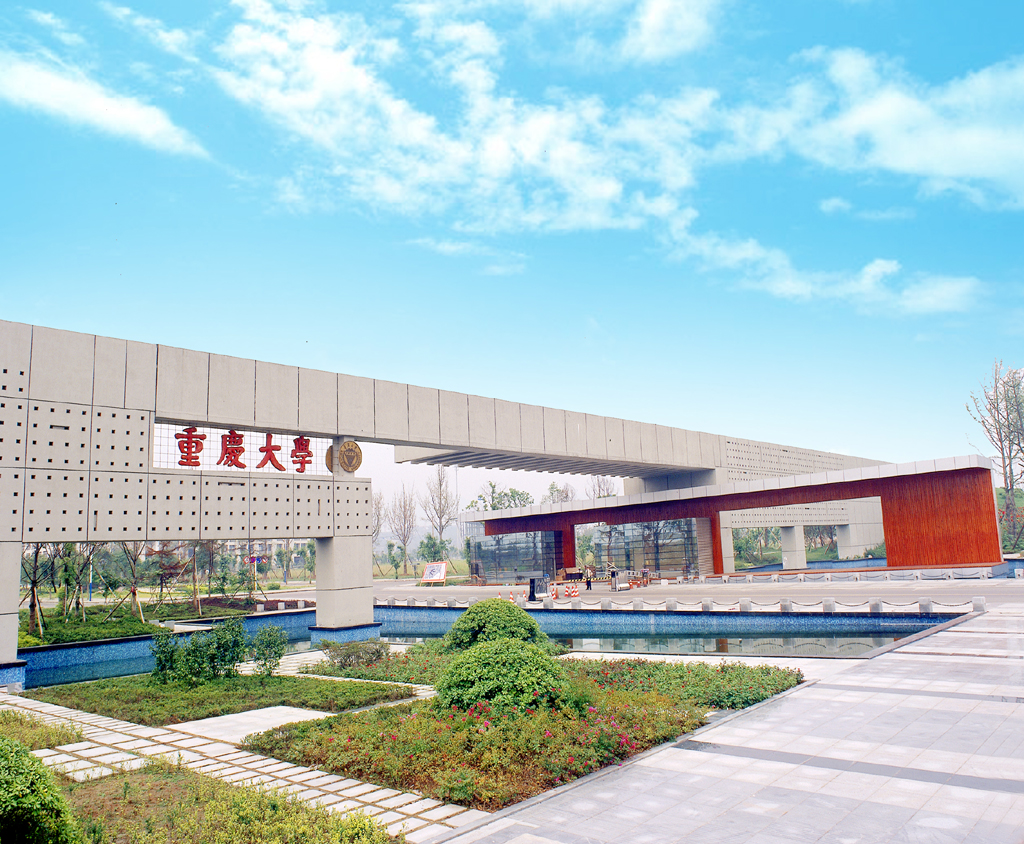
Chongqing University

- Chongqing University (重庆大学)
- Southwest University (西南大学)
- Chongqing University of Science and Technology (重庆科技学院)
- Southwest University of Political Science and Law (西南政法大学)
- Army Medical University (第三军医大学)
- Chongqing University of Posts and Telecommunications (重庆邮电大学)
- Chongqing University of Technology (重庆理工大学)
- Chongqing Jiaotong University (重庆交通大学)
- Chongqing Medical University (重庆医科大学)
- Chongqing Normal University (重庆师范大学)
- Chongqing Technology and Business University (重庆工商大学)
- Chongqing Three Gorges University (重庆三峡学院)
- Chongqing Telecommunication Institute (重庆通讯学院)
- Sichuan Fine Arts Institute (四川美术学院)
- Sichuan International Studies University (四川外国语大学)
- University of Logistics (后勤工程学院)
- Chongqing University of Arts and Science (重庆文理学院)
- Yangtze Normal University (长江师范学院)
- Chongqing University of Education (重庆第二师范学院)

=== Notable high schools ===
- Chongqing Changshou Middle School (重庆市长寿中学校)
- Fuling Experimental High School (涪陵实验中学)
- Chongqing No.1 Middle School (重庆一中)
- Chongqing Nankai Secondary School (重庆南开中学)
- Chongqing No.8 Secondary School (重庆八中)
- Bashu Secondary School (巴蜀中学)
- Chongqing Railway High School (重庆铁路中学)
- Chongqing Yucai Secondary School (育才中学)
- Chongqing Foreign Language School (The High School Affiliated to Sichuan International Studies University 重庆一外)
- Verakin High School of Chongqing (The 2nd Chongqing Foreign Language School, 重庆二外)
- Chongqing Qiujing High School (求精中学)
- High School Affiliated to Southwest University (西南大学附中)
- Chongqing NO.18 Secondary School (重庆十八中)

=== International schools ===
- Yew Chung International School of Chongqing (重庆耀中国际学校)
- KL International School of Chongqing Bashu (重庆市诺林巴蜀外籍人员子女学校)
- Harrow Lide School Chongqing (重庆哈罗礼德学校)
- Lucton School Chongqing (重庆莱克顿学校)
- EtonHouse Pre-school, Bishan, Chongqing

== Transportation ==
Since its elevation to national-level municipality in 1997, the city has dramatically expanded its infrastructure. With the construction of railways and expressways to the east and southeast, Chongqing is a major transportation hub in southwestern China.

As of October 2014, the municipality had 31 bridges across the Yangtze River including over a dozen in the city's urban core. Aside from the city's first two Yangtze River bridges, which were built, respectively, in 1960 and 1977, all of the other bridges were completed since 1995.

=== Public transit ===
==== Chongqing Rail Transit ====
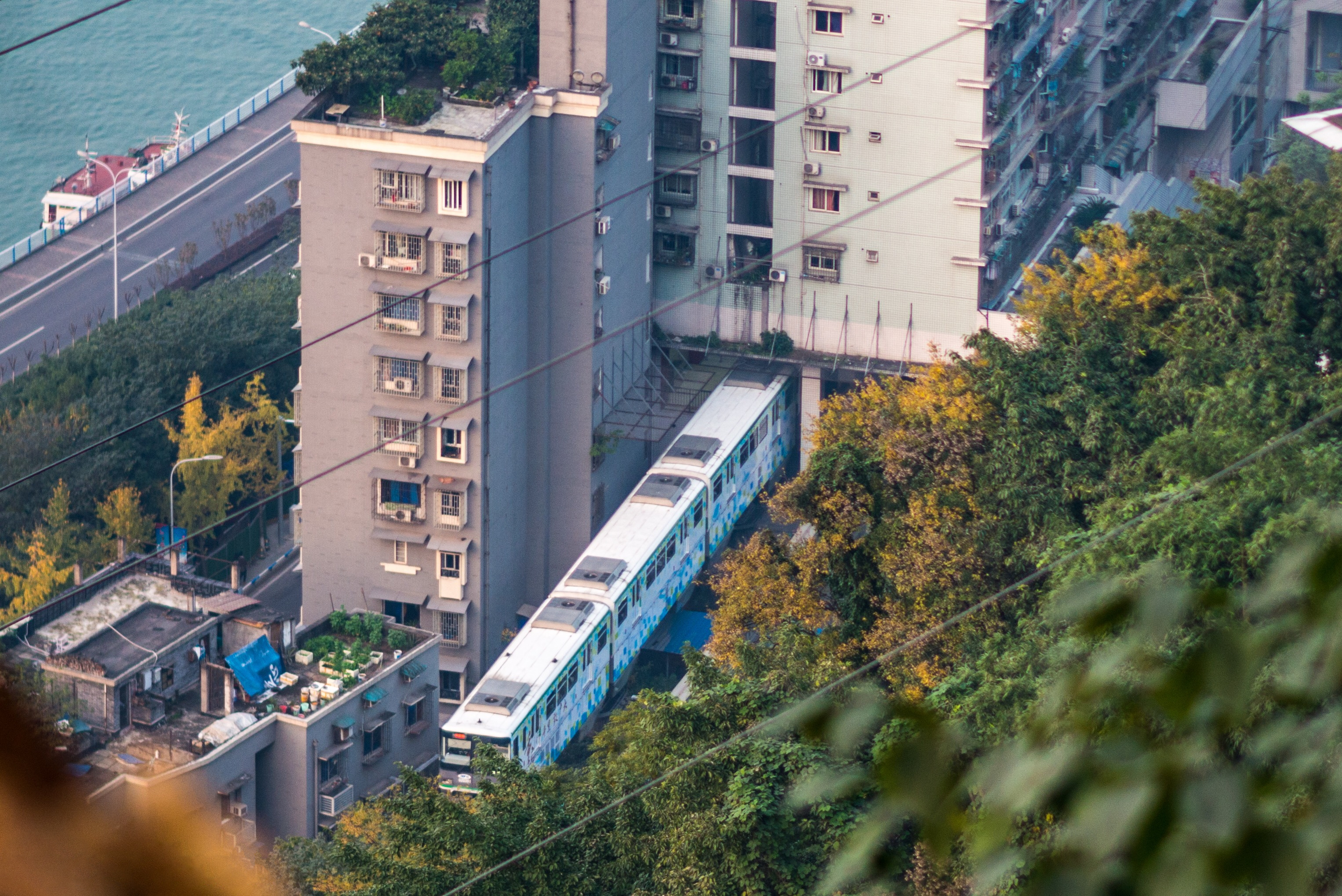
A train of Chongqing Rail Transit Line 2 coming through a residential building at Liziba station

Public transport in Chongqing consists of metro, intercity railway, a ubiquitous bus system and the world's largest monorail network.

According to the Chongqing Municipal Government's ambitious plan in May 2007, Chongqing is investing 150 billion RMB over 13 years to finish a system that combines underground metro lines with heavy monorail.

As of 2017, four metro lines, the 14-kilometer (8.7 mi) long CRT Line 1, a conventional subway, and the 19-kilometer (12 mi) long heavy monorail CRT Line 2 (through Phase II), Line 3, a heavy monorail connects the airport and the southern part of downtown. Line 6, runs between Beibei, a district in the city's far north to downtown. Line 5 opened in late 2017.

It was planned that by 2020, CRT would consist of 6 lines and 1 loop line, adding 363.5 kilometers (225.9 mi) of road and railway to the 2012 transportation infrastructure, and 93 new metro stations would be added to the 111 stations in place in 2012. By 2050 Chongqing would have 18 lines.

==== Aerial tramway ====
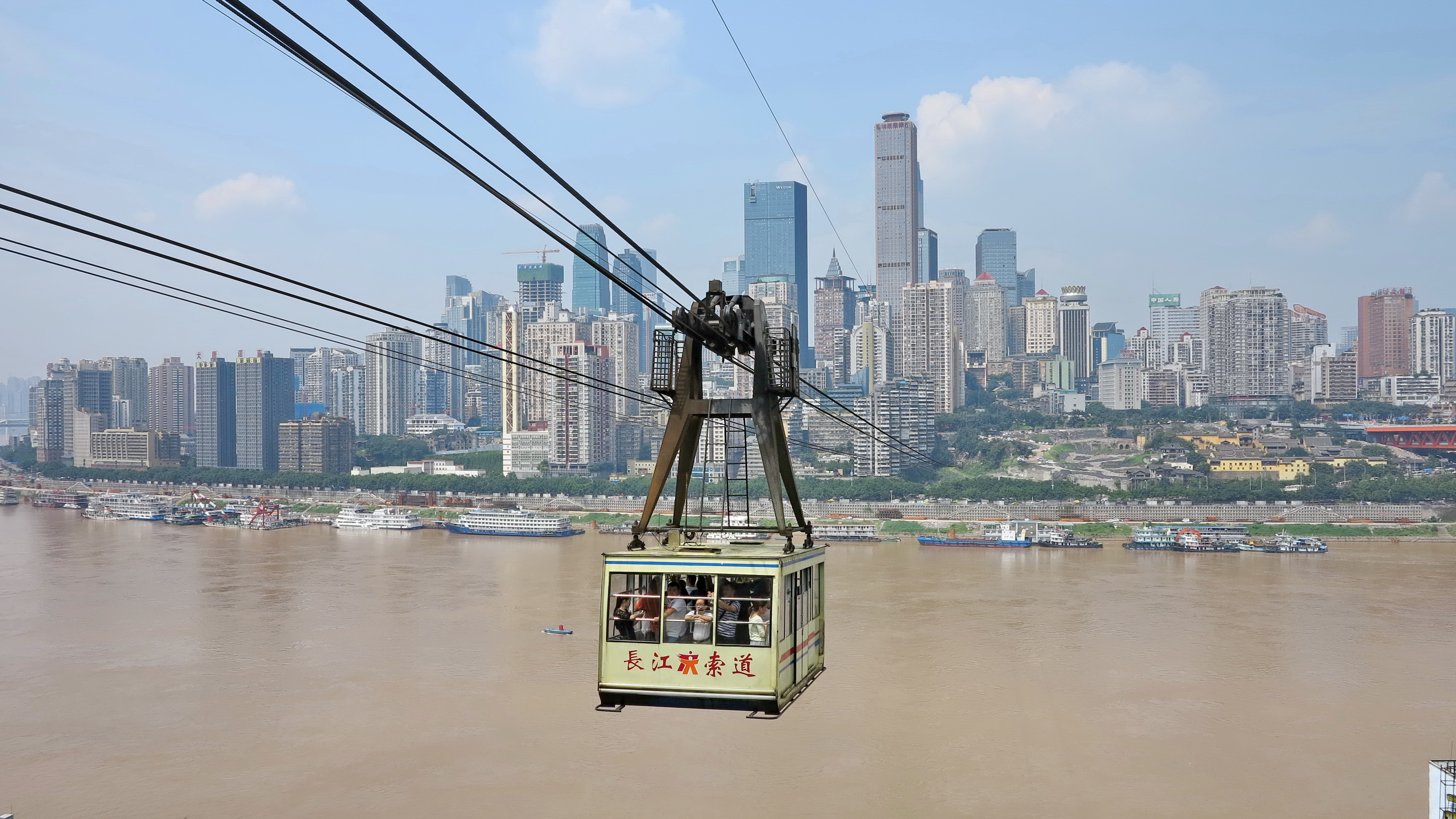
An aerial tramway across the Yangtze River in Chongqing CBD

Chongqing is the only Chinese city that has kept public aerial tramways. There were three aerial tramways in Chongqing: the Yangtze River Tramway, the Jialing River Tramway and the South Mountain Tramway, of which the Yangtze River Tramway is the only one still operating, now considered a Class 4A tourist attraction. The 1,160-meter (3,810 ft)-long tramway connects the southern and northern banks of the Yangtze River, carrying about 10,000 passengers a day.

=== Rail ===
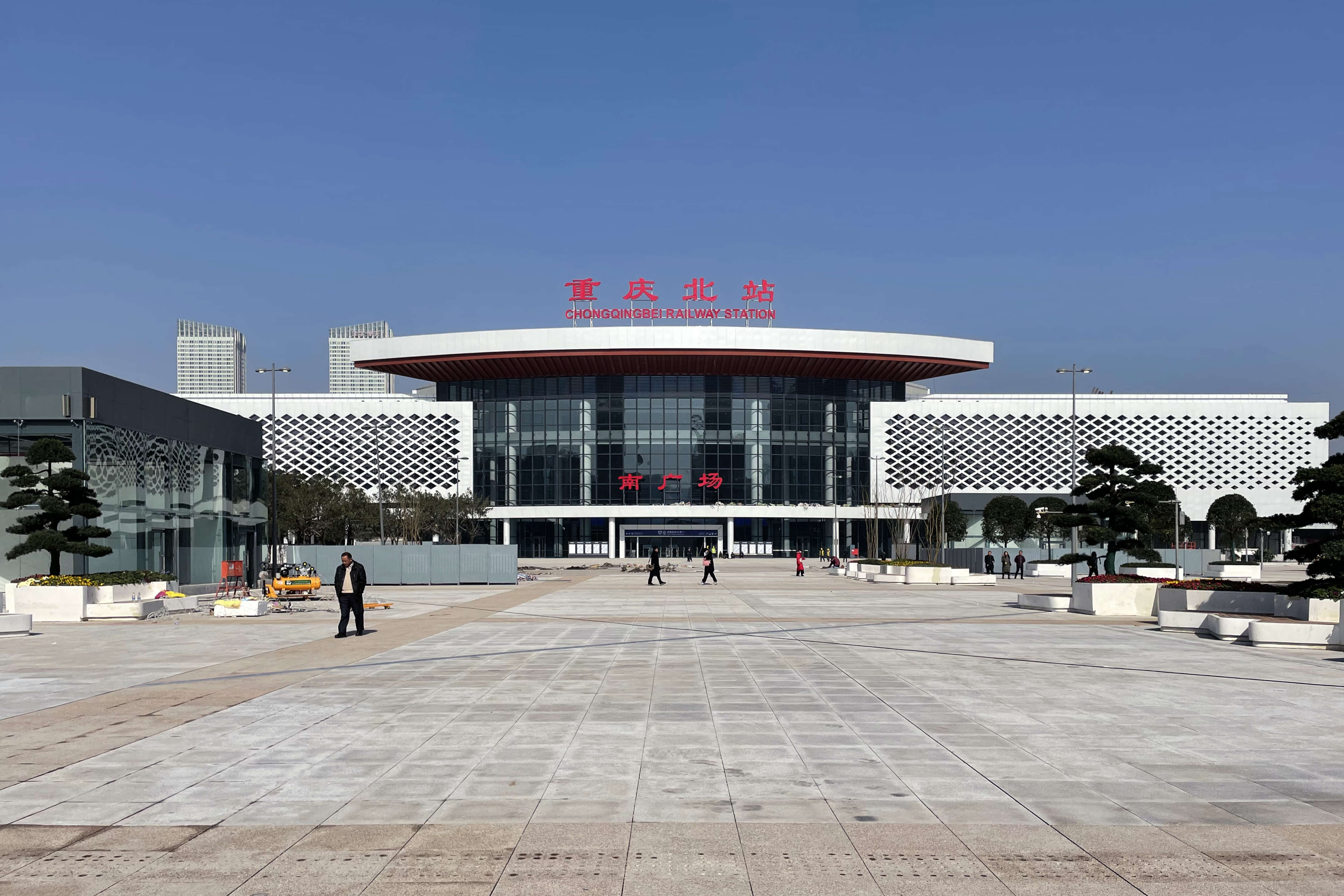
Chongqing North railway station

Major stations in Chongqing:

- Chongqing railway station in Yuzhong, accessible via Metro Lines 1 & 3 (Lianglukou Metro station), is the city's oldest railway station and located near the Jiefangbei CBD in the city center. The station handles mostly long-distance trains. There are plans for a major renovation and overhaul of this station, thus many services have been transferred to Chongqing North railway station.
- Chongqing North railway station is a station handling many long-distance services and high-speed rail services to Chengdu, Beijing and other cities. It was completed in 2006 and is connected to Metro Line.
- Chongqing West railway station is in Shapingba, a station handling many long-distance services and high-speed rail services to many cities, completed in 2018.
- Shapingba railway station is in Shapingba, near Shapingba CBD, accessible via Shapingba metro station on Lines 1, 9 and the Loop line. It handles many local and regional train services. It was completed in 2018.
- Chongqing East railway station opened in 2025.

Chongqing is a major freight destination for rail with continued development with improved handling facilities. Due to subsidies and incentives, the relocation and construction of many factories in Chongqing has seen a huge increase in rail traffic.

Chongqing is a major rail hub regionally.

- Chengdu–Chongqing railway (to Chengdu, Sichuan Province)
- Sichuan–Guizhou railway (to Guiyang, Guizhou Province)
- Xiangyang–Chongqing railway (to Hubei Province)
- Chongqing–Huaihua railway (to Hunan Province)
- Suining–Chongqing railway (to Sichuan Province)
- Chongqing–Lichuan railway (to Hubei Province)
- Lanzhou–Chongqing railway (to Gansu Province)

Chongqing is a major domestic hub in the China-Europe railway, which is developed through the Belt and Road Initiative.

=== River port ===
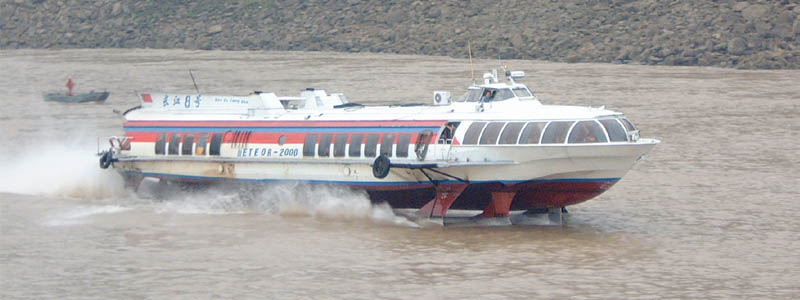
Hydrofoil on the Yangtze in the outer reaches of the municipality

Chongqing is one of the most important inland ports in China. There are numerous luxury cruise ships that terminate at Chongqing, cruising downstream along the Yangtze River to Yichang, Wuhan, Nanjing or even Shanghai. In the recent past, this provided virtually the only transportation option along the river. However, improved rail, expressways and air travel have seen this ferry traffic reduced or canceled altogether. Most of the river ferry traffic consists of leisure cruises for tourists rather than local needs. Improved access by larger cargo vessels has been made due to the construction of the Three Gorges Dam. This allows bulk transport of goods along the Yangtze River. Coal, raw minerals and containerized goods provide the majority of traffic plying this section of the river. Several port handling facilities exist throughout the city, including many impromptu river bank sites.

=== Highways ===
Traditionally, the road network in Chongqing has been narrow, winding and limited to smaller vehicles because of the natural terrain, large rivers and the huge population demands on the area, especially in the Yuzhong District. In other places, such as Jiangbei, large areas of homes and buildings have recently been cleared to improve the road network and create better urban planning; thus, several ring roads have also been constructed. This has seen many tunnels and large bridges needing to be built across the city. The construction of many expressways have connected Chongqing to its neighbors. The natural mountainous terrain that Chongqing is built on makes many road projects difficult to construct, including for example some of the world's highest road bridges.

Unlike many other Chinese cities, it is rare for motorbikes, electric scooters or bicycles to be seen on Chongqing's Roads. This is due to the extremely hilly and mountainous nature of Chongqing's roads and streets. However, despite this, Chongqing is a manufacturing center for these types of vehicles.

- Chongqing-Chengdu Expressway
- Chongqing-Chengdu 2nd Expressway (under construction)
- Chongqing-Wanzhou-Yichang Highway (Wanzhou-Yichang section under construction)
- Chongqing-Guiyang Highway
- Chongqing-Changsha Expressway (Xiushan-Changsha section under construction)
- Chongqing-Dazhou-Xi'a Highway (Dazhou-Xi'an section under construction)
- Chongqing-Suining Expressway
- Chongqing-Nanchong Expressway
- China National Highway 210
- China National Highway 212

=== Bridges ===
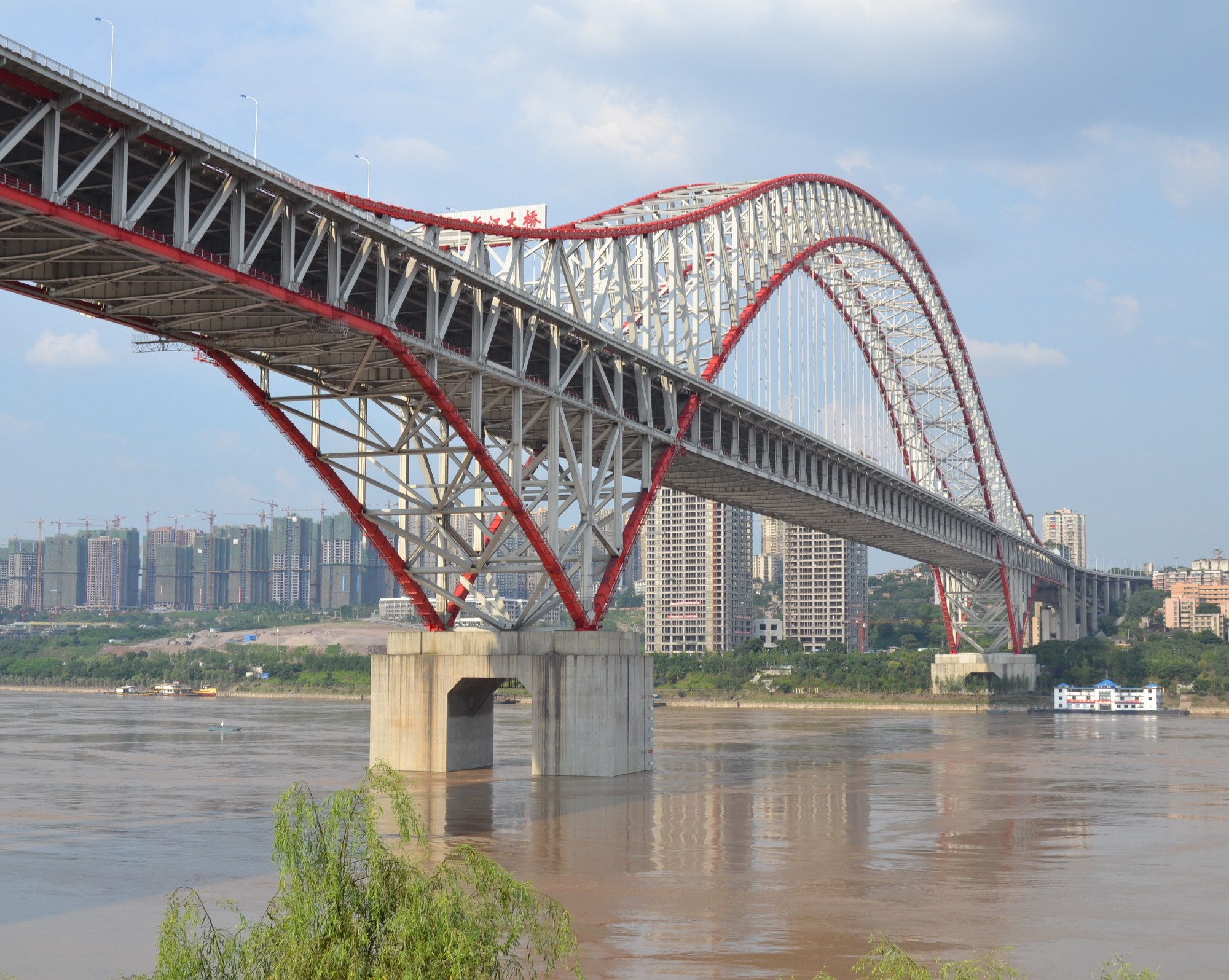
View of Chaotianmen Bridge across the Yangtze River in Chongqing

With so many bridges crossing the Yangtze and Jialing rivers in the urban area, Chongqing is sometimes known as the 'Bridge Capital of China'. The first important bridge in urban Chongqing was the Niujiaotuo Jialing River Bridge, built in 1958. The first bridge over the Yangtze was the Shibanpo Yangtze River Bridge (or Chongqing Yangtze River Bridge) built in 1977.

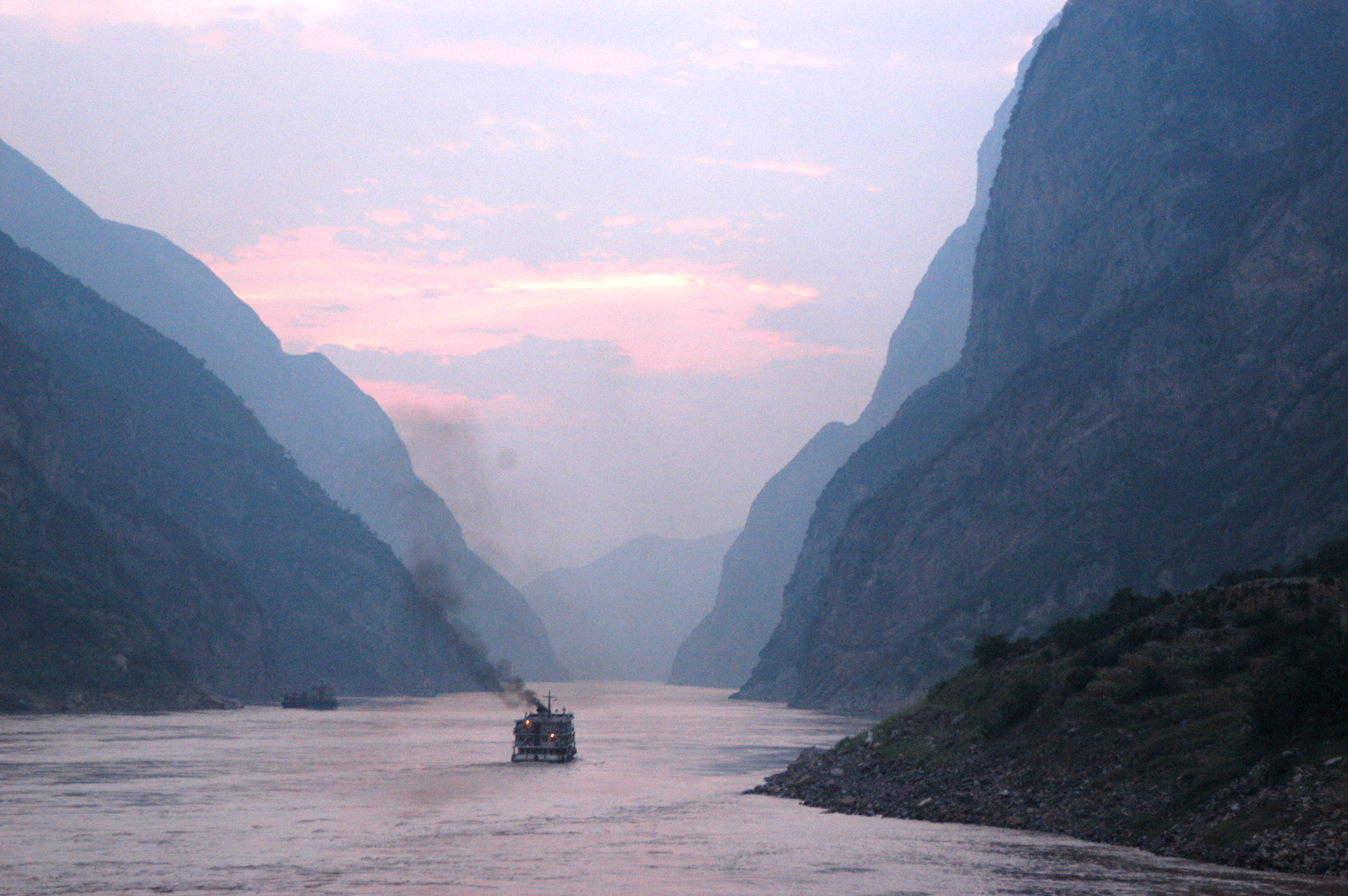
Yangtze River

As of 2014, within the area of the 9 districts, there were 20 bridges on the Yangtze and 28 bridges on the Jialing. The bridges in Chongqing exhibit a variety of shapes and structures.

=== Airports ===
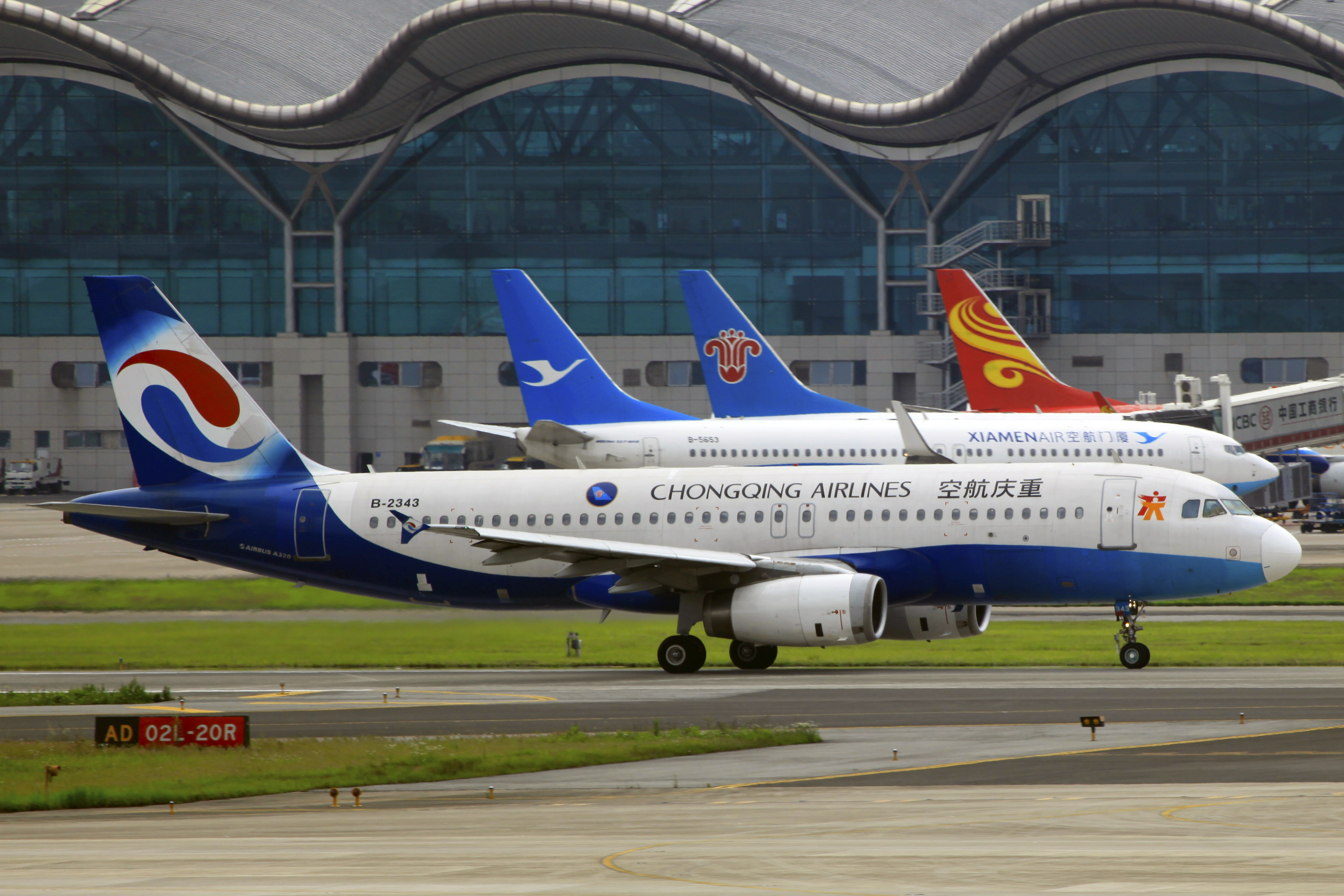
Chongqing Airlines Airbus A320 in Chongqing Jiangbei International Airport

The major airport of Chongqing is Chongqing Jiangbei International Airport (IATA: CKG, ICAO: ZUCK). It is located in Yubei District. The airport offers a growing network of nonstop flights to China, Southeast Asia, the Middle East, Europe, North America and Oceania. It is located 21 km (13 mi) north of Downtown Chongqing and serves as an important aviation hub for southwest China. Jiangbei airport is a hub for China Southern, Chongqing Airlines, China Express, Sichuan Airlines, Hainan Airlines and West Air. Chongqing also is a focus city of Air China and Xiamen Air, therefore it is very well connected with Star Alliance and Skyteam's international network. Shandong Airlines and Tianjin Airlines also uses Chongqing as a focus city. The airport currently has four parallel runways in operation. It serves domestic routes to most other Chinese cities, as well as international routes to Auckland, Brussels, London, Madrid, Moscow, Milan, Seattle, Sydney, Doha, Dubai, Seoul, Bangkok, Phuket, Osaka, Paris, Singapore, Chiang Mai, Phnom Penh, Siem Reap, Malé, Bali, Tokyo, Kuala Lumpur, Jakarta, Rome and Budapest, etc. As of 2021, Jiangbei Airport was the 4th busiest airport in terms of passenger traffic in mainland China.

Currently, Jiangbei airport has three terminals. Chongqing Airport has metro access (CRT Line 3 and Line 10) to its central city.

There are four other airports in Chongqing Municipality: Qianjiang Wulingshan Airport, Wanzhou Wuqiao Airport, Chongqing Xiannüshan Airport, and Chongqing Wushan Airport. They are all class 4C airports and serve passenger flights to domestic destinations including Beijing, Shanghai and Kunming.

== Culture ==
=== Language ===
Zhongshan Ancient Town, Jiangjin, Chongqing

The language native to Chongqing is Southwestern Mandarin. More precisely, the great majority of the municipality, save for Xiushan, speak Sichuanese, including the primary Chengdu-Chongqing dialect and Minjiang dialect spoken in Jiangjin and Qijiang. There are also a few speakers of Xiang and Hakka in the municipality, due to the great immigration wave to the Sichuan region (湖廣填川) during the Ming and Qing dynasties. In addition, in parts of southeastern Chongqing, the Miao and Tujia languages are also used by some Miao and Tujia people.

=== Tourism ===
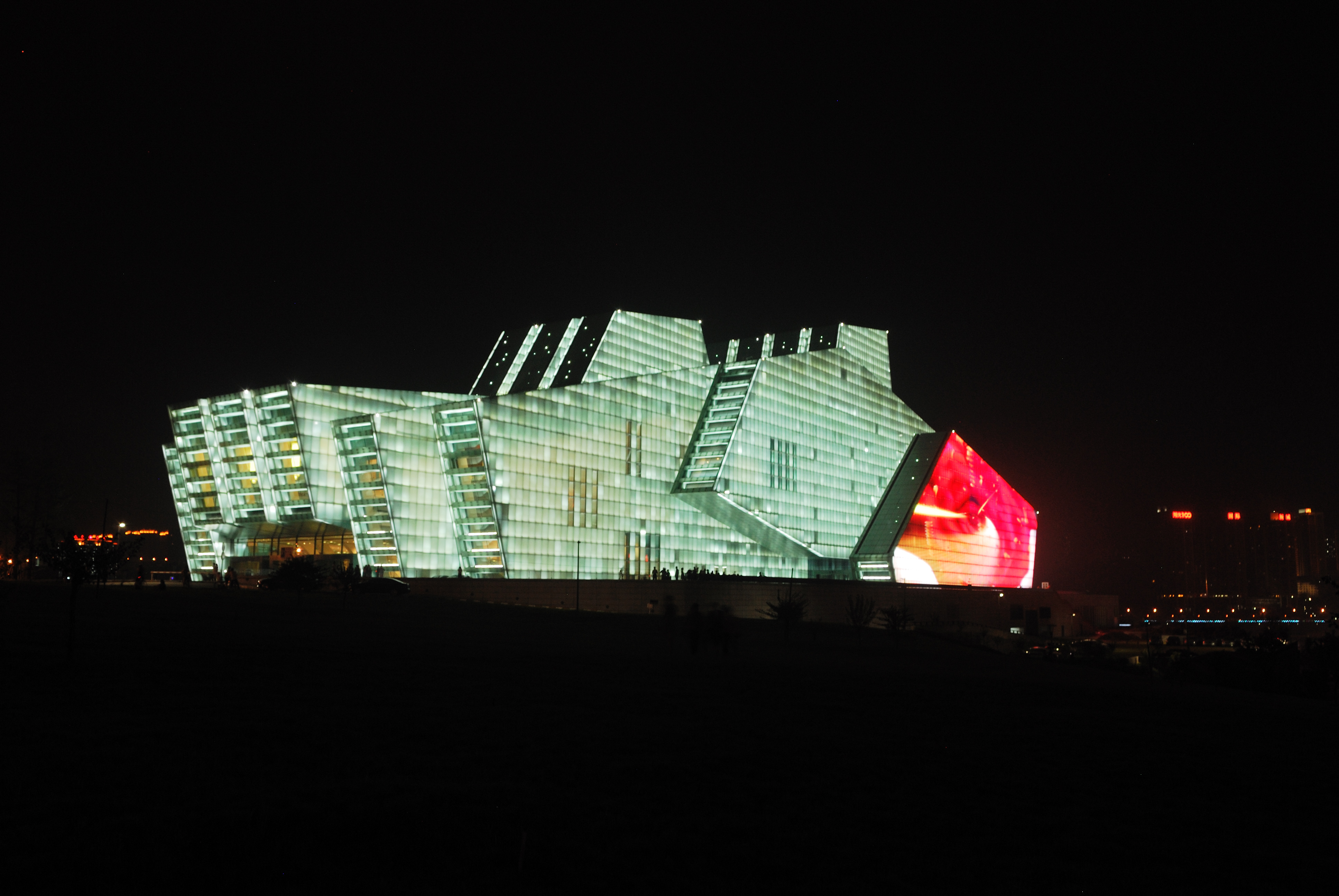
Chongqing Grand Theater

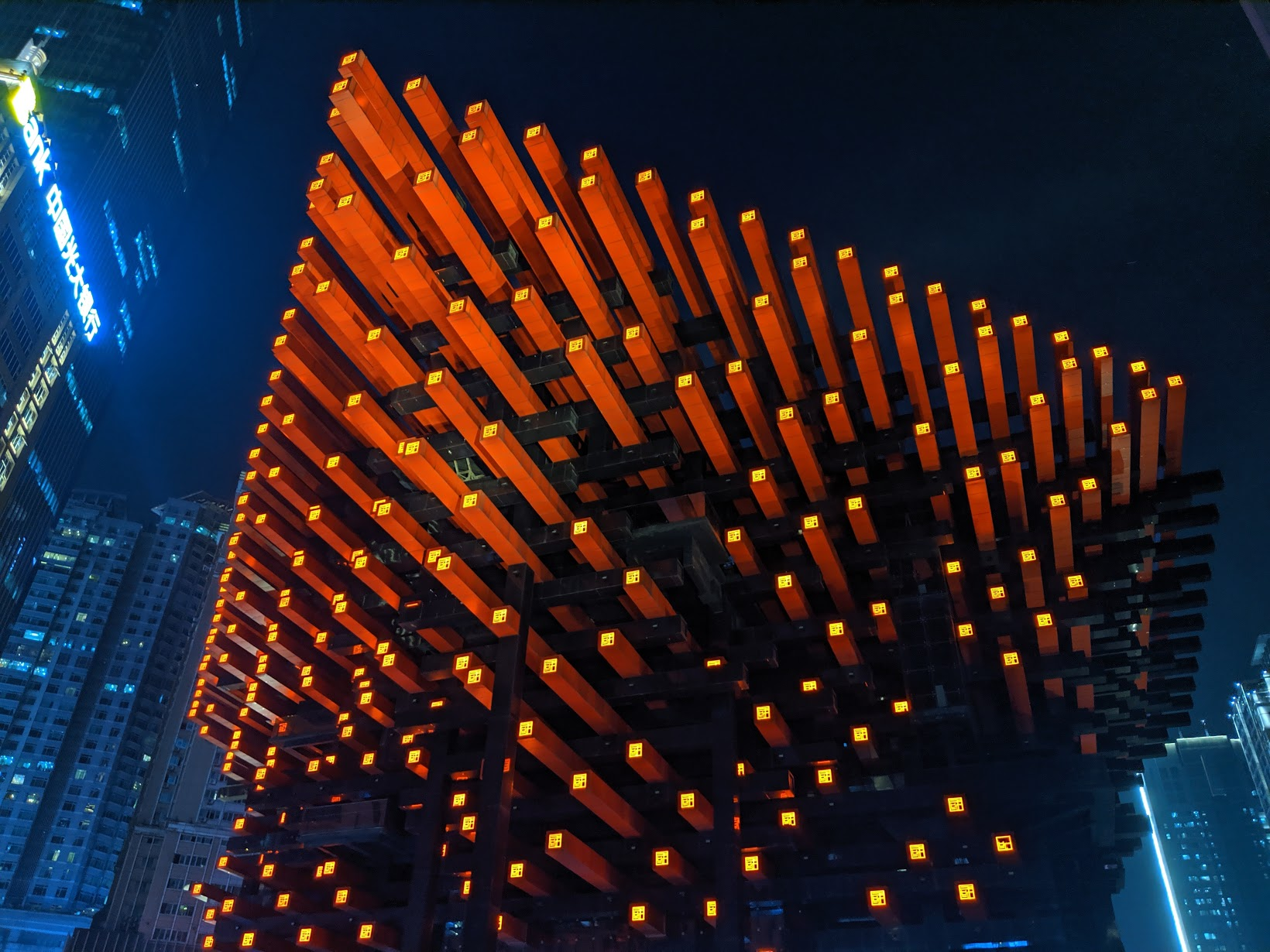
Chongqing Art Museum

As the provisional Capital of China for almost ten years (1937 to 1945), the city was also known as one of the three headquarters of the Allies during World War II, as well as being a strategic center of many other wars throughout China's history. Chongqing has many historic war-time buildings or sites, some of which have since been destroyed. These sites include the People's Liberation Monument, located in the center of Chongqing city. It used to be the highest building in the area, but is now surrounded and dwarfed by numerous shopping centers. Originally named the Monument for the Victory over Axis Armies, it is the only building in China for that purpose. Today, the monument serves as a symbol for the city.

The General Joseph W. Stilwell Museum, dedicated to General "Vinegar Joe" Stilwell, a World War II general. the air force cemetery in the Nanshan area, in memory of those air force personnel killed during the Second Sino-Japanese War (1937–1945), and the Red Rock Village Museum, a diplomatic site for the Communist Party in Chongqing led by Zhou Enlai during World War II, and Guiyuan, Cassia Garden, where Mao Zedong signed the "Double 10 (10 October) Peace Agreement" with the Kuomintang in 1945.

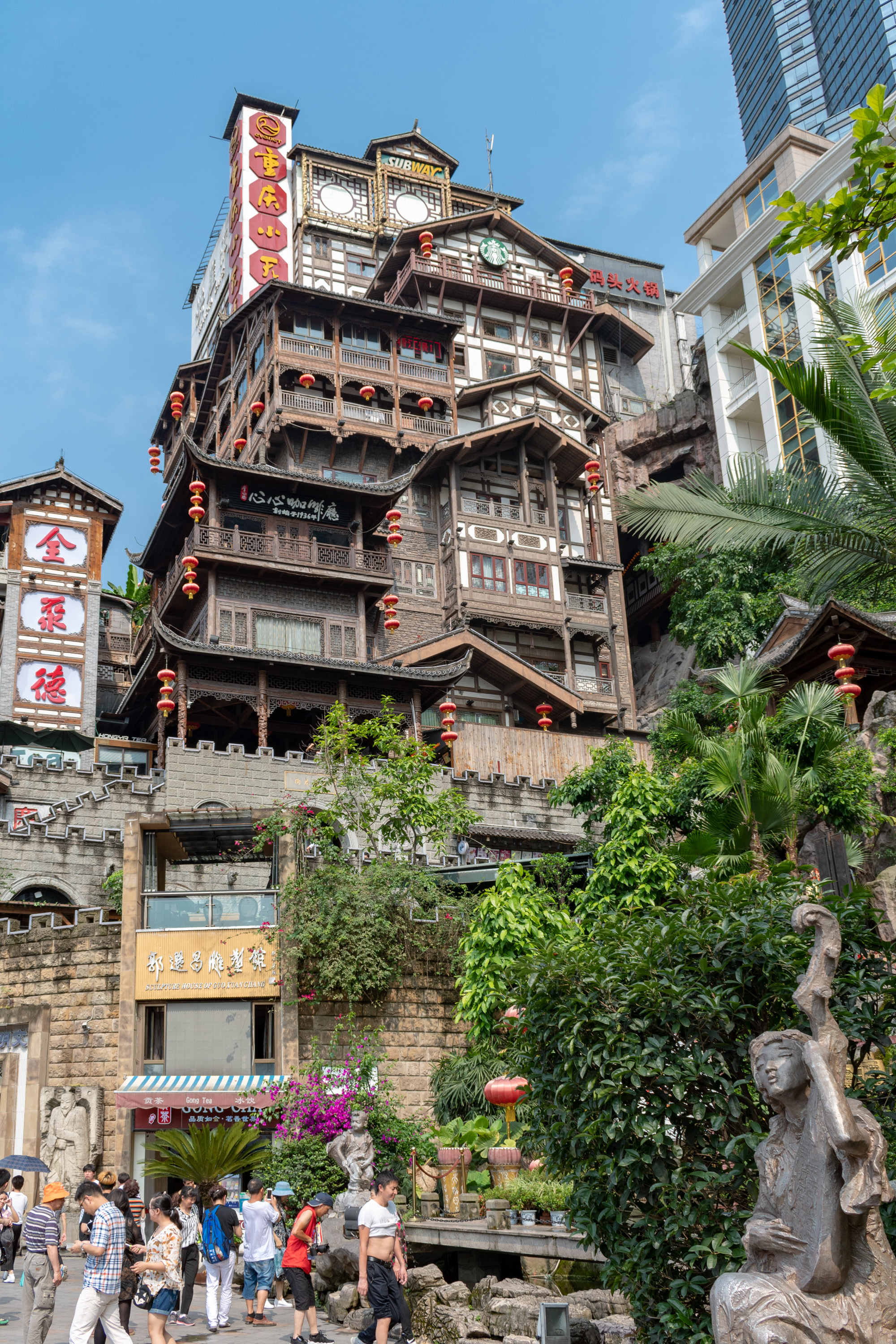
The Hongya Cave (Hongya-dong) traditional Bayu-style stilted houses at Jiefangbei CBD

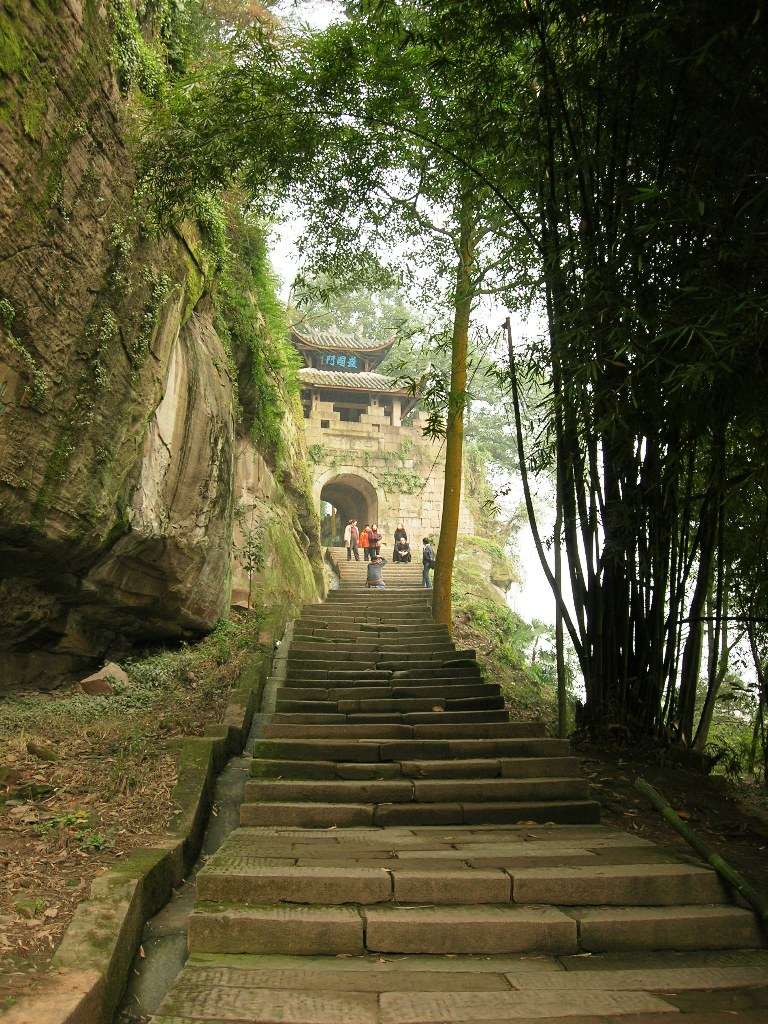
The steep path up to the front gate of Fishing Town

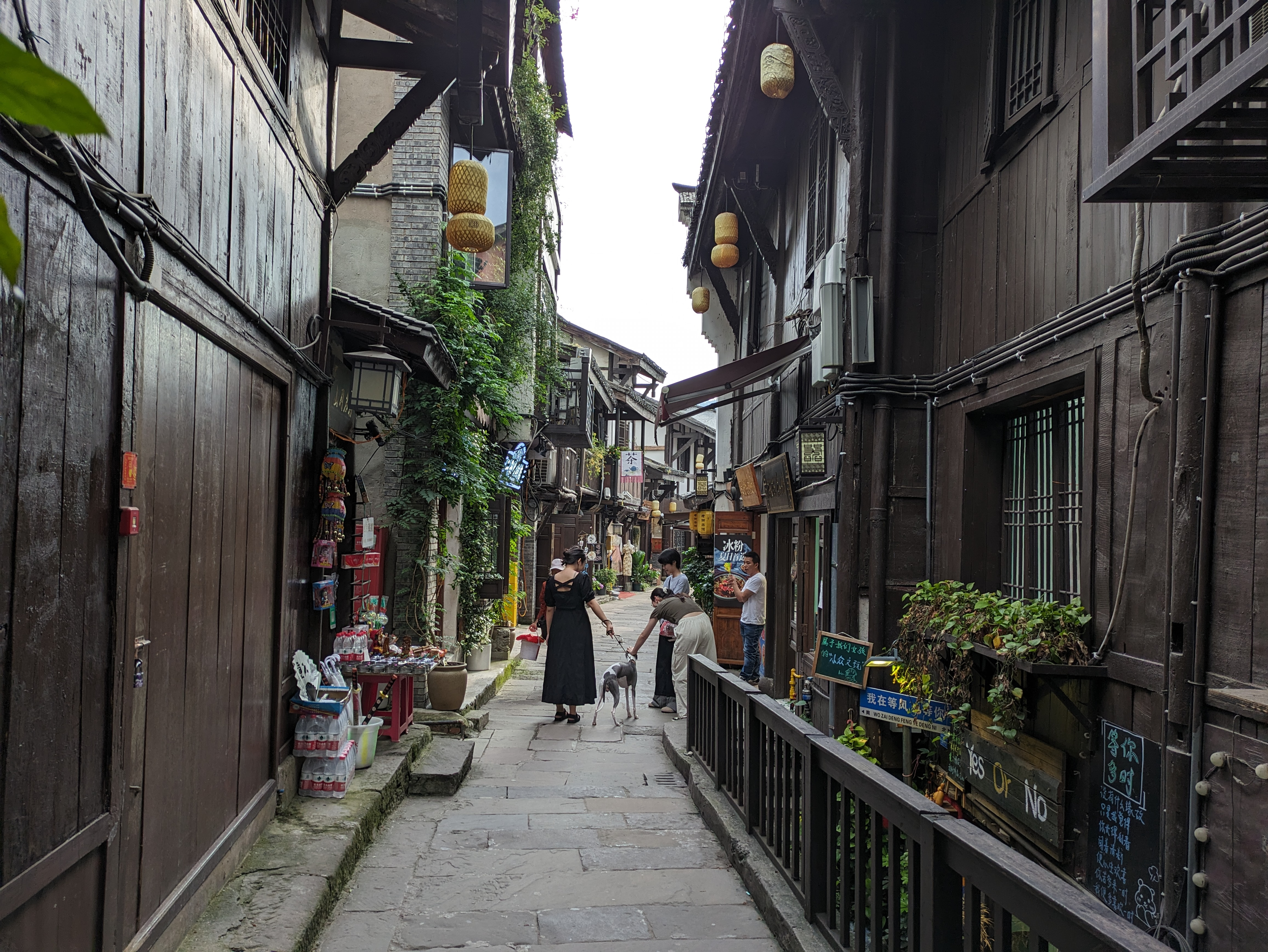
Old Town of Ciqikou in Shapingba District

- The Baiheliang Underwater Museum, China's first underwater museum
- The Memorial of Great Tunnel Massacre, a former air-raid shelter where a major massacre occurred during World War II
- The Great Hall of the People in Chongqing is based on the Great Hall of the People in Beijing. This is one of the largest public assembly buildings in China which, though built in modern times, emulates traditional architectural styles. It is adjacent to the densely populated and hilly central district, with narrow streets and pedestrian only walkways,
- The large domed Three Gorges Museum presents the history, culture, and environment of the Three Gorges area and Chongqing.
- Chongqing Art Museum is known for striking architecture.
- Chongqing Science and Technology Museum has an IMAX theater.
- Luohan Si, a Ming dynasty temple,
- Huangguan Escalator, the second longest escalator in Asia.
- Former sites for embassies of major countries during the 1940s. As the capital at that time, Chongqing had many residential and other buildings for these officials.
- Wuxi County, noted as a major tourism area of Chongqing,

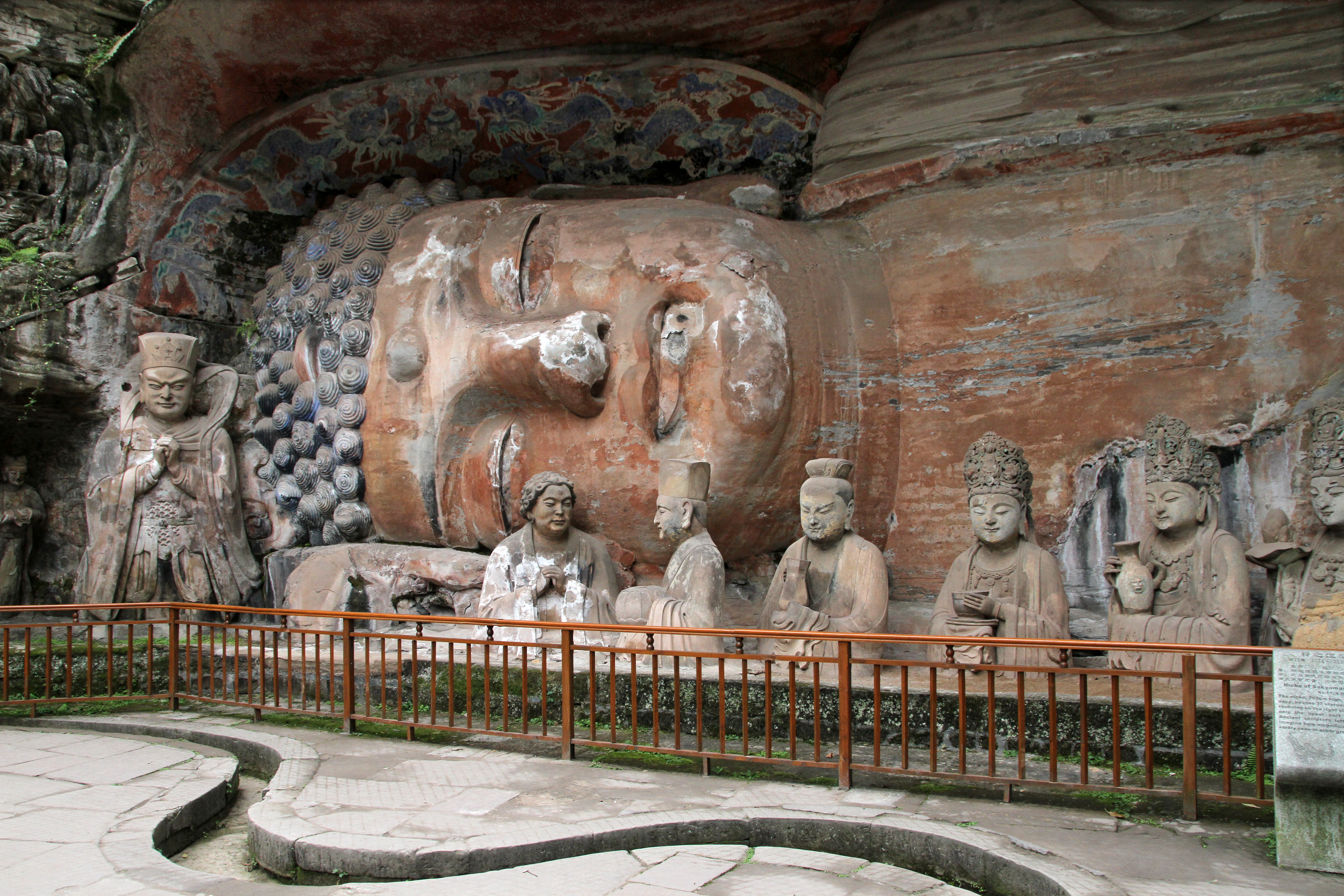
Dazu Rock Carvings

- The Dazu Rock Carvings, in Dazu county, are a series of Chinese religious sculptures and carvings, dating back as far as the 7th century A.D., depicting and influenced by Buddhist, Confucian and Taoist beliefs. Listed as a UNESCO World Heritage Site, the Dazu Rock Carvings are made up of 75 protected sites containing some 50,000 statues, with over 100,000 Chinese characters forming inscriptions and epigraphs.
- The Three Natural Bridges and Furong Cave in Wulong Karst National Geology Park, Wulong County are listed as a UNESCO World Heritage Site as part of the South China Karst,
- Ciqikou is a 1000-year-old town in the Shapingba District of Chongqing. It is also known as "Little Chongqing". The town, located next to the lower reaches of the Jialing River, was at one time an important source of china-ware and used to be a busy commercial dock during the Ming and Qing dynasties,
- The city is recognized as a "Design City" by UNESCO's Creative Cities Network.
- Fishing Town or Fishing City is one of the three great ancient battlefields of China. It is noted for its resistance to the Mongol armies during the Southern Song dynasty (1127–1279) and the location where the Mongol leader Möngke Khan died in 1259,
- Xueyu Cave in Fengdu County is the only example of a pure white, jade-like karst cave in China,
- Fengdu Ghost City in Fengdu County is the Gate of the Hell in traditional Chinese literature and culture.
- Baidi Cheng, a peninsula in Yangtze River, known in a poem by Li Bai
- The Chongqing Zoo, a zoo that exhibits many rare species including the giant panda, the extremely rare South China tiger, and the African elephant.
- Chongqing Amusement Park.
- Chongqing Grand Theater, a performing arts center.
- Foreigners' Street was an amusement park, including the Porcelain Palace, the world's largest toilet. Also the location of the abortive Love Land development in 2009.
- The Black Mountain Valley (Heishangu).
- Hongya Cave (aka Hongya Dong), a pier stilt house fortress that served as one of the 17 city gates of Ancient Chongqing is a popular tourist attraction for its architecture.

=== Cuisine ===
Chongqing food is part of Sichuan cuisine. Chongqing is known for its spicy food. Its food is normally considered numbing because of the use of Sichuan pepper, also known as Sichuan peppercorn, containing hydroxy-alpha-sanshool. Chongqing's city center has many restaurants and food stalls where meals often cost less than RMB10. Local specialties here include dumplings and pickled vegetables, and, different from many other Chinese regional cuisines, Chongqing dishes are suitable for the solo diner as they are often served in small individually-sized portions. Among the local specialties are:

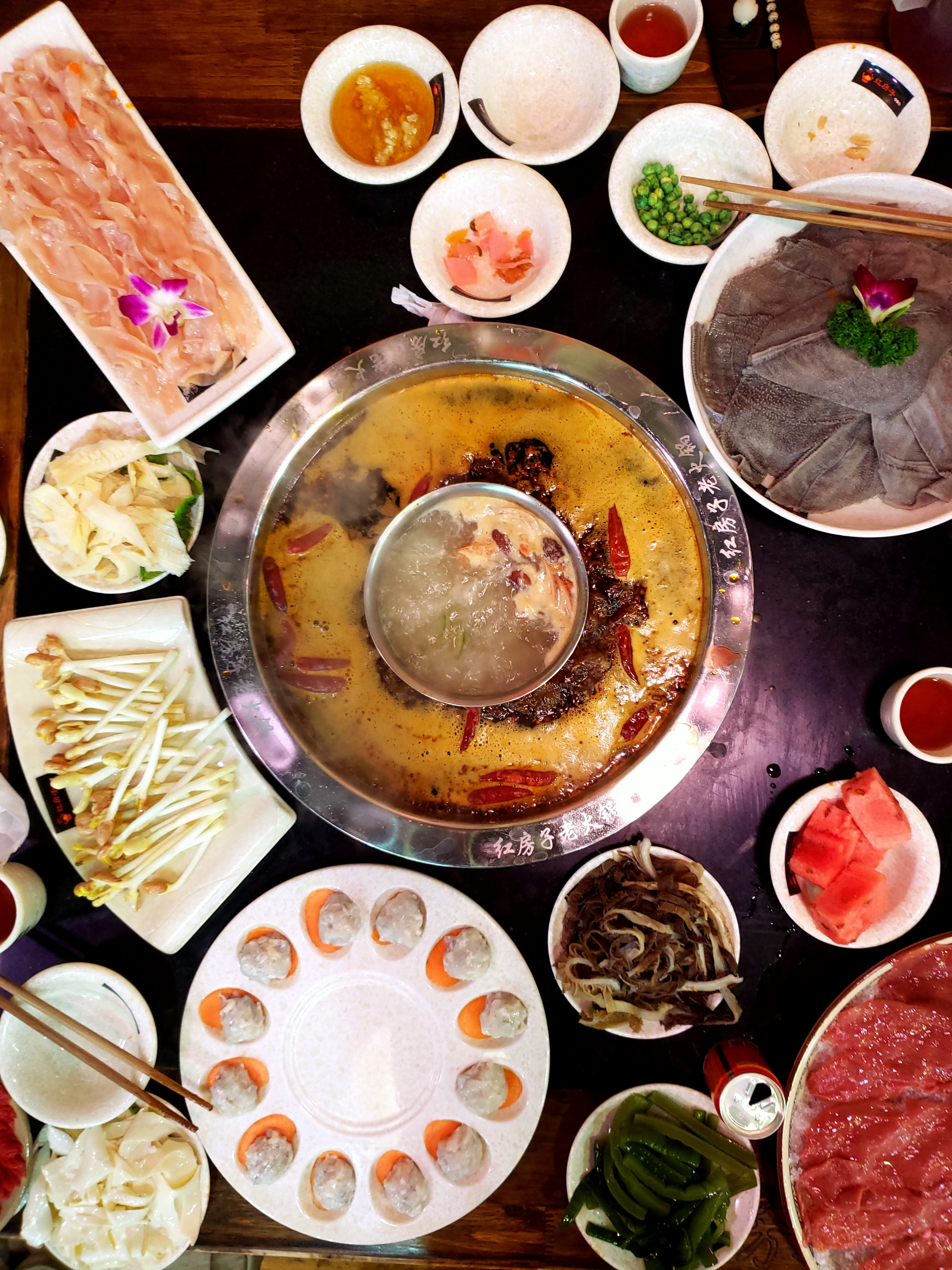
Typical Chongqing hot pot served with minced shrimp, tripe, pork aorta, goose intestine, and kidney slices

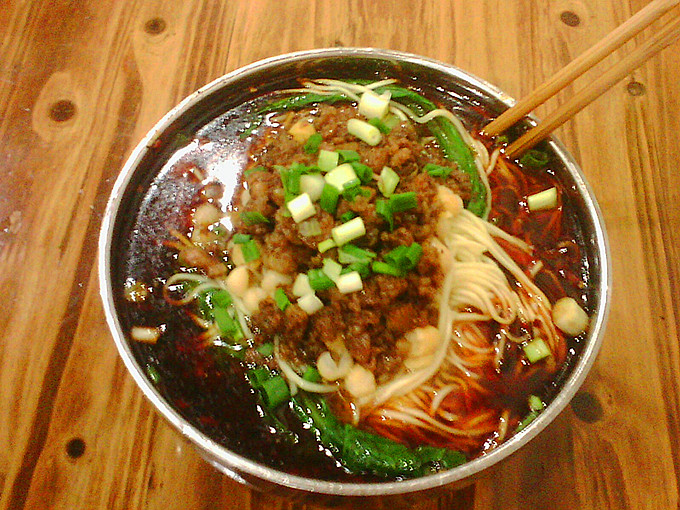
Chongqing xiao mian with peas and spicy bean paste

- Chongqing hot pot – Chongqing's local culinary specialty which was originally from Northern China. Tables in hot pot restaurants usually have a central pot, where food ordered by the customers is boiled in a spicy broth, items such as beef, pork, tripe, kidney slices, pork aorta and goose intestine are often consumed.
- Chongqing xiao mian – a common lamian noodle dish tossed with chili oil and mixtures of spices and ingredients
- Jiangtuan fish – since Chongqing is located along the Jialing River, visitors have a good opportunity to sample varieties of aquatic products. Among them is a fish local to the region, Jiangtuan fish (Hypophthalmichthys nobilis), more commonly known as bighead carp. The fish is often served steamed or baked.

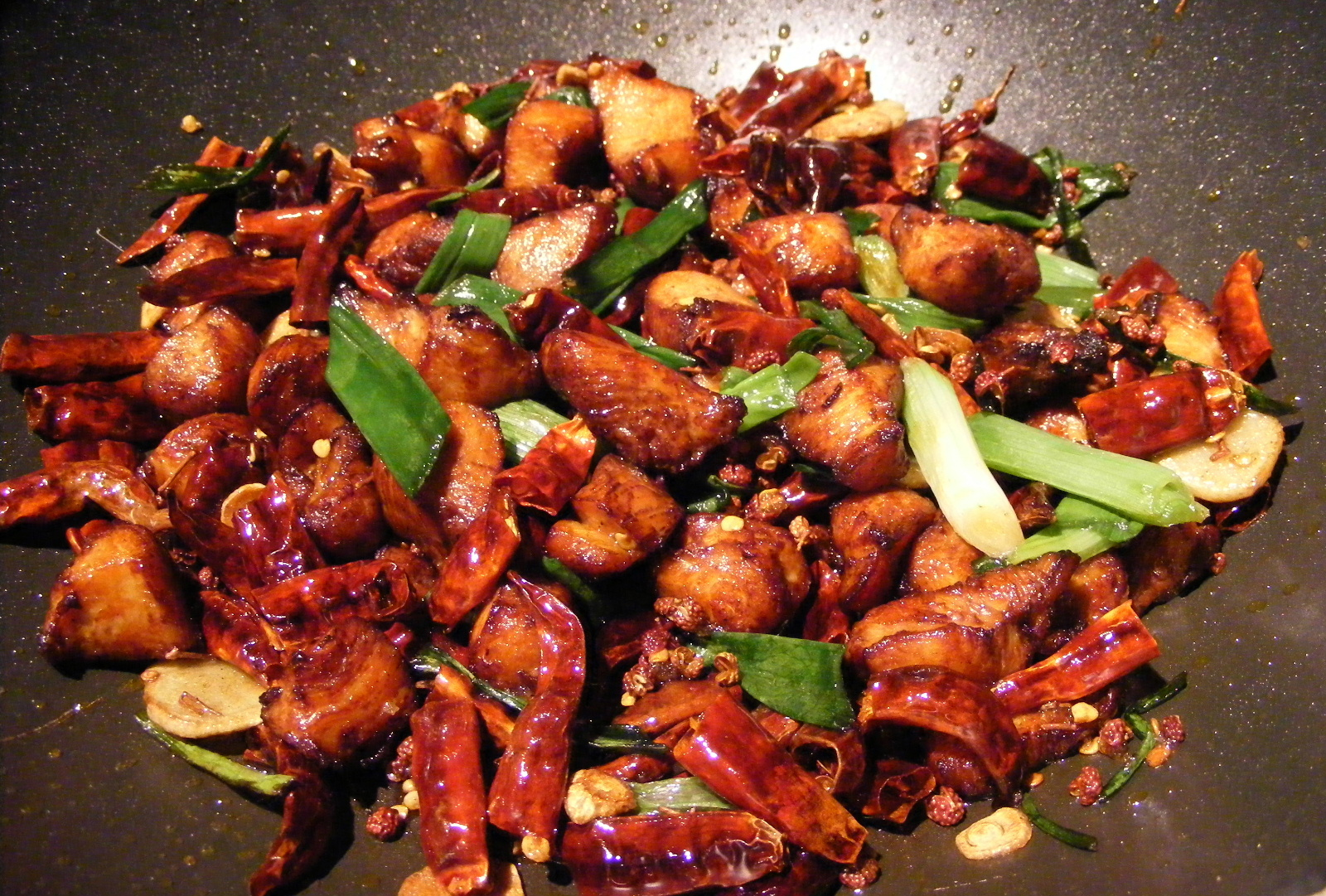
Laziji is famous for its crispy texture.

- Suan la fen (sour and spicy sweet potato noodles) – thick, transparent noodles of rubbery texture in a spicy vinegar soup.
- Laziji (spicy chicken) – a stir-fried dish consisting of marinated and deep-fried pieces of chicken, dried Sichuan chili peppers, Sichuan peppercorns, garlic, and ginger, which originated near Geleshan in Chongqing.
- Quanshui ji (spring water chicken) – cooked with the natural spring water in the Southern Mountain of Chongqing.
- Pork leg cooked with rock sugar – a common household dish of Chongqing, the tender, reddish dish has been described as having a strong and sweet aftertaste.
- Qianzhang (skimmed soy bean cream) – the cream skimmed from soybean milk. In order to create this, several steps must be followed very carefully. First, soybeans are soaked in water, ground, strained, boiled, restrained several times and spread over gauze until delicate, snow-white cream is formed. The paste can also be hardened, cut into slivers and seasoned with sesame oil, garlic and chili oil. Another variation is to bake the cream and fry it with bacon, which is described as soft and sweet.
- Fish with pickled mustard greens – a dish originating from Chongqing

=== Media ===
The Chongqing People's Broadcast Station is Chongqing's largest radio station. The only municipal-level TV network is Chongqing TV, claimed to be the fourth-largest television station in China. Chongqing TV broadcasts many local-oriented channels, and can be viewed on many TV sets throughout China.

=== Sports and recreation ===
==== Basketball ====
The Chongqing Soaring Dragons became the 20th team playing in the Chinese Basketball Association in 2013. They played at Datianwan Arena, in the same sporting complex as Datianwan Stadium. The team moved to Beijing in 2015 and is currently known as the Beijing Royal Fighters.

==== Soccer ====
Professional soccer teams in Chongqing include:

- Chongqing Liangjiang Athletic, folded
- Chongqing F.C., folded

Chongqing Liangjiang Athletic was a professional Chinese soccer club that played in the Chinese Super League. They were owned by the Chongqing-based Lifan Group, which manufactures motorcycles, cars and spare parts. Originally called Qianwei (Vanguard) Wuhan, the club formed in 1995 to take part in the recently developed, fully professional Chinese Soccer League. They would quickly rise to top tier of the system and experience their greatest achievement in winning the 2000 Chinese FA Cup, and coming in fourth within the league. However, since then they have struggled to replicate the same success, and have twice been relegated from the top tier.

Chongqing FC was a soccer club located in the city that competed in China League One, the country's second-tier soccer division, before being relegated to the China League Two, and dissolved due to a resultant lack of funds.

==== Sport venues ====
Sport venues in Chongqing include:

- The Chongqing Olympic Sports Center is a multipurpose stadium. It is currently used mostly for soccer matches, as it has a grass surface, and can hold 58,680. It was built in 2002 and was one of main venues for the 2004 AFC Asian Cup.
- Yanghe Stadium is a multiuse stadium that is currently used mostly for soccer matches. The stadium holds 32,000 people, and is the home of Chongqing Lifan in the Chinese Super League. The stadium was purchased by the Lifan Group in 2001 for RMB80 million and immediately replaced Datianwan Stadium as the home of Chongqing Lifan.
- Datianwan Stadium is a multipurpose stadium that is currently used mostly for soccer matches. The stadium has a capacity 32,000 people, and up until 2001 was the home of Chongqing Lifan.

=== Cloud Valley ===
At the end of 2020, a collaboration between a Danish architecture firm and a Chinese tech company Terminus was announced, taking the form of an AI-controlled campus. The project is named Cloud Valley and aims to use sensors and WiFi-controlled devices to collect data on the city's residents and atmosphere, including weather and eating and sleeping habits. The AI will adapt devices to work in a way that fits the gathered information and improves residents' lives.

=== "Backstreet" photography culture ===
In recent years, photographer-led groups have popularized "Houjie" (后街, Backstreet) photography walks in the older, non-touristed neighborhoods of Chongqing, such as in Dadukou District. These walks aim to document the city's rapidly vanishing urban fabric and everyday life, creating a grassroots archival movement.

== Notable people ==
- Ba Manzi: legendary hero of Ba kingdom in Zhou dynasty
- Gan Ning: general serving under warlord Sun Quan in the last years of Han dynasty
- Yan Yan: loyal general during Three Kingdoms period
- Lanxi Daolong: famous Buddhism monk and philosopher in Song dynasty who went to Japan and established the Kenchō-ji
- Qin Liangyu: popular heroine in Ming dynasty who fought against Manchus
- Nie Rongzhen: marshal of the People's Liberation Army of China
- Liu Bocheng: an early leader of Chinese communist party during Anti-Japanese War
- Lu Zuofu: notable industrialist and businessman who was the founder of the Minsheng Shipping Company
- Liu Yongqing: wife of the former president and Communist Party general secretary Hu Jintao
- Xia Peisu: computer scientist
- Huang Qian: chess player
- Tian Liang: Olympic diving gold medalist
- Li Yundi: pianist
- Karry Wang: member of the pop band TFBoys and actor
- Roy Wang: singer-songwriter and member of TFBoys, also an actor and television host
- Li Hua: artist who studied in Europe
- Xiao Zhan: actor, singer, and member of the boy group X Nine
- Pan Wenhua: military general regarded as a born military prodigy
- Zhou Zhennan: leader of C-pop group R1SE
- Shi Tingmao: Olympic diving gold medalist
- Chen Zihan: actress
- Shuguang Zhang: biochemist
- Xia Li: professional wrestler signed with TNA
- Feng Timo: singer, pop star and Internet personality
- Domee Shi: Chinese Canadian animator, director and screenwriter
- Ryan Chen: Chinese Trump impersonator

== International relations ==
=== Consulates ===
Consulate	Date	Consular District	Ref.
Canada Consulate-General	05.1998	Chongqing, Sichuan, Guizhou, Yunnan	
United Kingdom Consulate-General	03.2000	Chongqing, Sichuan, Guizhou, Yunnan	
Cambodia Consulate-General	12.2004	Chongqing, Hubei, Hunan, Shaanxi	
Japan Consulate-General	01.2005	Chongqing, Sichuan, Guizhou, Yunnan, Shaanxi	
Philippines Consulate-General	12.2008	Chongqing, Guizhou, Yunnan	
Hungary Consulate-General	02.2010	Chongqing, Sichuan, Guizhou, Yunnan, Shaanxi, Gansu	
Italy Consulate-General	12.2013	Chongqing, Sichuan, Guizhou, Yunnan	
Uruguay Consulate-General	12.2019	Chongqing, Sichuan, Yunnan, Shaanxi, Gansu	
Belarus Consulate-General	01.2021	Chongqing, Sichuan	
Myanmar Consulate-General	07.2022	Chongqing, Sichuan, Guizhou, Yunnan, Shaanxi, Gansu	
Vietnam Consulate-General	10.2025	Chongqing, Sichuan	
Mexico Consulate	09.2026	Chongqing, Sichuan, Hubei	

=== Twin towns – sister cities ===
Chongqing has sister city relationships with many cities of the world including:

- Toulouse, France (1982)
- Seattle, United States (1983)
- Ottawa, Canada (1983)
- Philadelphia, United States (1983)
- Kobe, Japan (1983)
- Detroit, United States (1986)
- Honolulu, United States (1986)
- Vancouver, Canada (1986)
- Indianapolis, United States (1986)
- San Antonio, United States (1986)
- Chicago, United States (1986)
- San Francisco, United States (1986)
- Toronto, Canada (1986)
- St. Louis, United States (1986)
- Hiroshima, Japan (1986)
- Osaka, Japan (1986)
- Leicester, United Kingdom (1993)
- Voronezh, Russia (1993)
- Zaporizhzhia, Ukraine (2002)
- Mpumalanga, South Africa (2002)
- Sliven, Bulgaria (2002)
- Düsseldorf, Germany (2004)
- Brisbane, Australia (2005)
- Shiraz, Iran (2005)
- New York City, United States (2011)
- Chennai, India (2015)
- Ajman, United Arab Emirates (2025)

== See also ==
- List of cities in China by population and built-up area
- List of twin towns and sister cities in China
- Major national historical and cultural sites in Chongqing
- New first-tier city

== Notes ==
Preceded by Guangzhou	Wartime Capital of China; Republic of China; 21 November 1937 – 5 May 1946	Succeeded by Nanjing
Preceded by Guangzhou	Wartime Capital of China; Republic of China; 14 October 1949 – 30 November 1949	Succeeded by Chengdu
