= Bill Steele (cave explorer) =

American academic

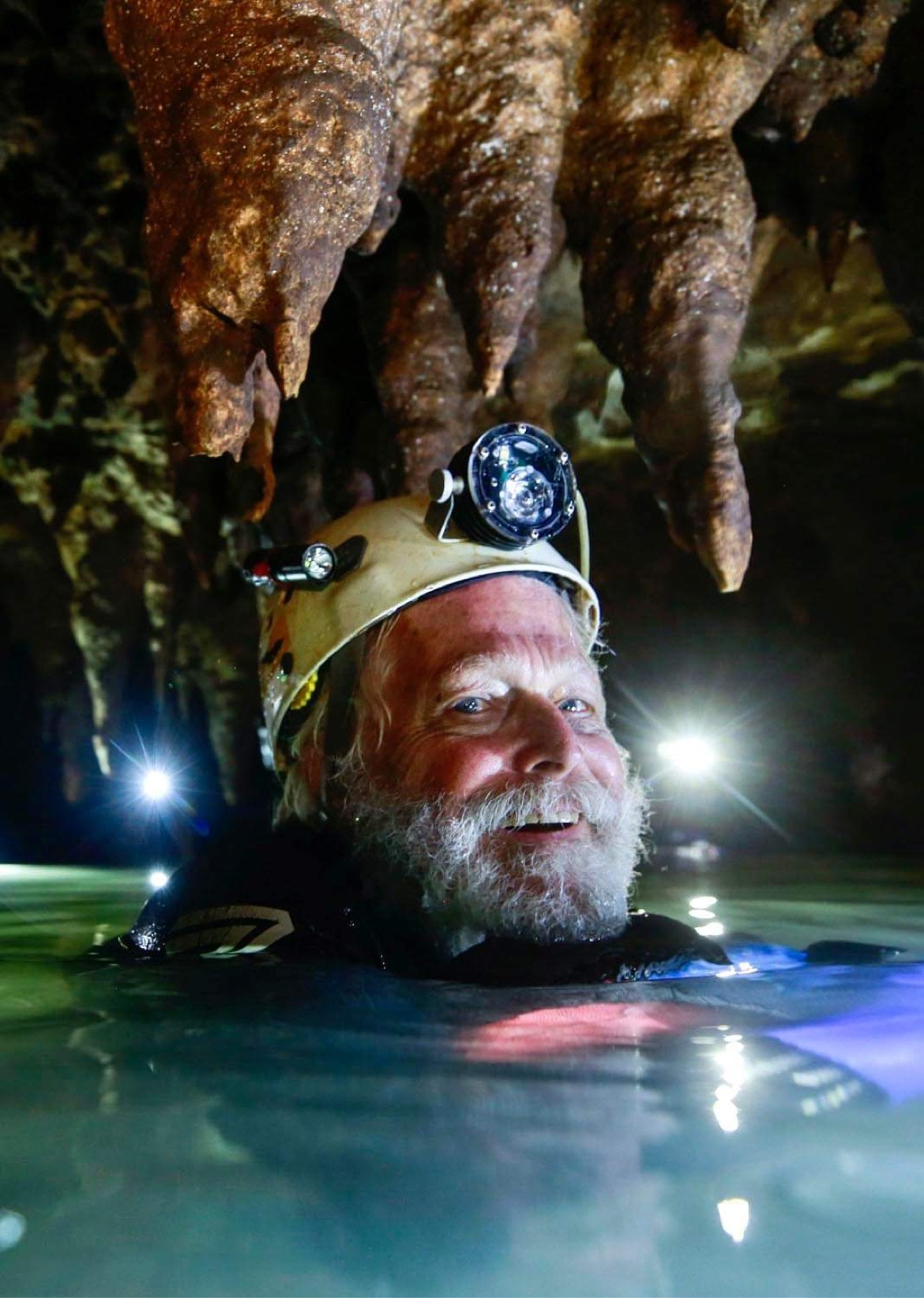
- Bill Steele swimming in Honey Creek Cave, Texas’ longest cave, Photo by Erich Schlegal.
- Born: October 17, 1948 (age 77); Dayton, Ohio
- Occupation: World Explorers Bureau keynote speaker
- Known for: Deep cave explorer

Charles William Steele, Jr. (born October 17, 1948) is a caver and speleologist who has led and participated in expeditions to many of the longest and deepest caves in the United States, Mexico, and China. He has explored hundreds of caves across North America and Asia and has written two books chronicling his expeditions: Yochib: The River Cave, and Huautla: Thirty Years in One of the World's Deepest Caves. TV shows such as National Geographic Explorer, NOVA and How’d They Do That? have aired programs on his expeditions.

== Biography ==
Steele was born in Dayton, Ohio. As a child he moved to Los Angeles and Atlanta before settling back in Dayton where he graduated from Centerville High School in 1966. According to Steele, while out on a Boy Scout adventure when he was 13 years old, he discovered a previously unexplored passage in a Kentucky cave. During the trip he got the taste of original exploration and from that moment he was "bitten by the bug." The following year, he organized an explorer post that specialized in speleology, joined the National Speleological Society, and became an Eagle Scout.

In the late 1960s, Steele was involved in the exploration and mapping of Ellison’s Cave, Georgia. He began organizing caving expeditions to Mexico. In 1971, he explored and mapped the longest cave in Mexico at the time, Grutas de Juxtlahuaca, which contains the oldest known cave paintings in the Western Hemisphere. Based up on this exploratory work, Juxtlahuaca subsequently became a national park.

He graduated from Indiana University Bloomington in 1973, and became a full-time explorer for the remainder of the decade. He participated in numerous expeditions to the Silvertip Cave System in the Bob Marshall Wilderness in Montana.

Through the 1970s, along with others from an Austin, Texas-based group known as the Association for Mexican Cave Studies, he explored southern Mexico to look for deep caves. In 1976 and 1977, he led expeditions to explore a cave said to be the “world’s most dangerous and difficult cave,” Sumidero Yochib, in Chiapas, Mexico. In 1977, he also co-led three expeditions to Oaxaca, Mexico, to explore Sistema Huautla, a cave system first discovered in 1965, and considered the deepest in the Western Hemisphere.

Continuing to explore caves throughout the United States, Steele led and participated in expeditions to Sistema Huautla in Mexico almost every year through the 1980s. In 1987, the Huautla expedition connected the deep cave Nita Nanta to Sistema Huautla; which established it as the second deepest cave in the world. Steele went to Kijahe Xontjoa on the plateau to the east of Huautla with an expedition of Swiss explorers in 1993, and explored depths over 1,000 meters.

Steele joined the Hong Meigui Cave Exploration Society Study Area in 2011 and 2012. The expedition explored two of China’s longest caves in the Wulong Province: San Wang Dong and Er Wang Dong, cave systems which Steele describes as the “Carlsbad Caverns of China”.

In 2014, Steele helped to form the Proyecto Espeleologico Sistema Huautla (PESH), an official project of the National Speleological Society and the United States Deep Caving Team. The mission of PESH is to explore, survey and conduct a comprehensive speleological study of the Sistema Huautla area caves. Along with fellow cave explorer, Tommy Shifflett, Steele will lead annual expeditions from 2014-2023 to seek the deep. They have a goal of reaching 100 km in length and 1,610m in depth, a vertical mile. The expedition will also support the underground research of Mexican scientists.

In addition to his expeditions, Steele had a 34-year career with the Boy Scouts of America, retiring in 2014 as National Director for Alumni Relations and the National Eagle Scout Association.

For many years he served as Chairman for the United States Deep Caving Team. He has written two books that chronicle his cave exploration in Mexico: “Yochib:The River Cave” and “Huautla: Thirty Years in One of the World’s Deepest Caves”, both published by Cave Books. He is well-published in caving newsletters and journals. With Tommy Shifflett, he co-authored a chapter for “Encyclopedia of Caves.” He was profiled as one of 120 contemporary explorers in the 2009 book Adventurous Dreams, Adventurous Lives.

In 2018, Hemirrhagus billsteelei, a newly discovered species of spider was named after Steele in honor of "his contribution to the knowledge of Mexican Caves and his help in the collection of cave tarantulas and other arachnids in the Huautla Cave System".

Steele led a major speleological expedition to Sistema Huautla in southern Mexico, covered in June 2018 by National Geographic.

In May 2019 Steele led the way in making significant new discoveries in the popular Texas show cave Natural Bridge Caverns, the first new passages found in nearly 60 years. New discoveries continued in 2020 and 2021.

Since retiring from his career in 2014, Steele has been a public speaker telling tales of his cave explorations. He has spoken for all sorts of groups, annual meetings, and cruise ships all over the world.

In October 2022 a feature article was published about Steele’s contemporary cave exploration projects, written by a popular Texas outdoor writer.

In the December 2023 issue of Texas Monthly magazine an in-depth article about the cavers of Texas was published, written by staff writer Katy Vine, with Steele as the primary storyteller.

In May 2025 Texas Monthly magazine launched a PBS TV program called The Story, which are documentaries about some of their published stories. The first one has Steele in it. It’s ten minutes long.

== Awards and recognition ==
National Speleological Society, Fellow Member, 1976

National Speleological Society, Lew Bicking Award, 1977

The Explorers Club, Fellow Member, 1979

National Speleological Society, International SpeleoArt Salon, Merit Award,"Brake Bar Necklace," 2009

Boy Scouts of America, Distinguished Eagle Scout Award, for accomplishments as a cave explorer, 2011

The Explorers Club, Fellow Emeritus Member, 2013

The Explorers Club, Citation of Merit, 2015

National Speleological Society, SpeleoArt Salon, Best of Show and Caver Popular Vote, "Calcite-covered Rope," 2015

National Speleological Society, Spelean Arts and Letters Award, 2015

National Eagle Scout Association's Distinguished Service Award 2021 https://eagles.ggacbsa.org/nesa-distinguished-service-award/

Pod Casts
