= List of major power stations in Chongqing =

Below is a list of major power stations in Chongqing, China.

== Non-renewable ==
=== Coal based ===
Station	Name in Chinese	Coordinates	Capacity (MW)	Operational units and (type)	Under construction units	Reference
Wanzhou Power Station	神华万州电厂	30°40′38″N 108°23′57″E	4,100	2×1,050MW	2*1,000MW	
Luohuang Power Station	珞璜电厂	29°20′50″N 106°26′03″E	2,640	4×360MW, 2×600MW		
Daba Power Station	双槐电厂	30°09′40″N 106°32′53″E	1,920	2×300MW, 2×660MW		
Anwen Power Station	安稳电厂	28°38′28″N 106°45′11″E	1,320	2×660MW		
Chongqing Power Station	重庆电厂	28°50′39″N 106°46′25″E	1,320	2×660MW		
Fengjie Power Station	奉节电厂	31°06′46″N 109°26′42″E	1,200	2×600MW		
Shizhu Power Station	石柱电厂	30°23′27″N 108°13′14″E	700	2×350MW		
Wansheng Power Station	万盛电厂	28°50′23″N 106°46′34″E	600	2×300MW		
Baihe Power Station	白鹤电厂	31°16′09″N 108°27′25″E	600	2×300MW		
Nanchuan Shuijiang Thermal Power Station	南川水江热电联产	29°16′18″N 107°16′12″E	350	1×350MW		

=== Natural gas based ===
Station	Name in Chinese	Coordinates	Capacity (MW)	Operational units	Under construction units	Reference
Liangjiang Natural Gas Power Station	两江燃机电厂	29°47′04″N 106°30′46″E	2,424	2×470MW	2×741.87MW	
Huadian Tongnan Natural Gas Power Station	华电潼南燃机电厂		1,090	2×545MW		
Datang Jiangjin Natural Gas Power Station	大唐江津燃机电厂	29°15′00″N 106°26′32″E	1,070		2×535MW	
Yongchuan Gangqiao Natural Gas Power Station	永川港桥燃机电厂		501		1×501MW	
Fuling Baitao Natural Gas Power Station	涪陵白涛化工园区山窝组团热电联产		490		1×490MW	

== Renewable ==
=== Hydroelectric – conventional ===
Station	Name in Chinese	Coordinates	River	Total capacity (MW)	Dam height (meters)	Operational units	Under construction units	Reference
Pengshui Hydro Power Station	彭水水电站	29°12′02″N 108°11′50″E	Wu River	1,750	116.5	5×350MW		
Yinpan Hydro Power Station	银盘水电站	29°16′13″N 107°53′18″E	Wu River	600	80	4×150MW		
Caojie Hydro Power Station	草街航电枢纽工程	29°54′07″N 106°23′16″E	Jialing River	500	83.3	4×125MW		
Jiangkou Hydro Power Station	江口水电站	29°14′11″N 107°53′32″E	Furong River	300	139	3×100MW		

=== Hydroelectric – pumped storage ===
Station	Name in Chinese	Coordinates	Total capacity (MW)	Operational units	Under construction units
Panlong Pumped Storage Hydro Power Station	蟠龙抽水蓄能电站	28°50′54″N 106°28′01″E	1,200	4×300MW	
Liziwan Pumped Storage Hydro Power Station	栗子湾抽水蓄能电站		1,400		4×350MW

== See also ==
- List of power stations in China
