= Houping Miao and Tuzi Ethnic Township =

Ethnic township in Wulong District, People's Republic of China

Houping Miao and Tuzi Ethnic Township 后坪苗族土家族乡
- Ethnic Township
- Location in Chongqing
- Coordinates: 29°36′00″N 108°02′00″E
- Country: People's Republic of China
- Direct-administered municipality: Chongqing
- District: Wulong District

Houping Miao and Tujia Ethnic Township (后坪苗族土家族乡) is an ethnic township in Wulong District of the Chongqing Municipality of China. The area is noted for its landscape and geological features known as the Wulong Karst and the Er Wang Dong cave.

Houping obtained its ethnic township designation in 2009; previously, it was simply Houping Township.

== See also ==
- List of township-level divisions of Chongqing
