= Three Natural Bridges =

Set of natural bridges in China

Coordinates: 29°26′02″N 107°48′05″E

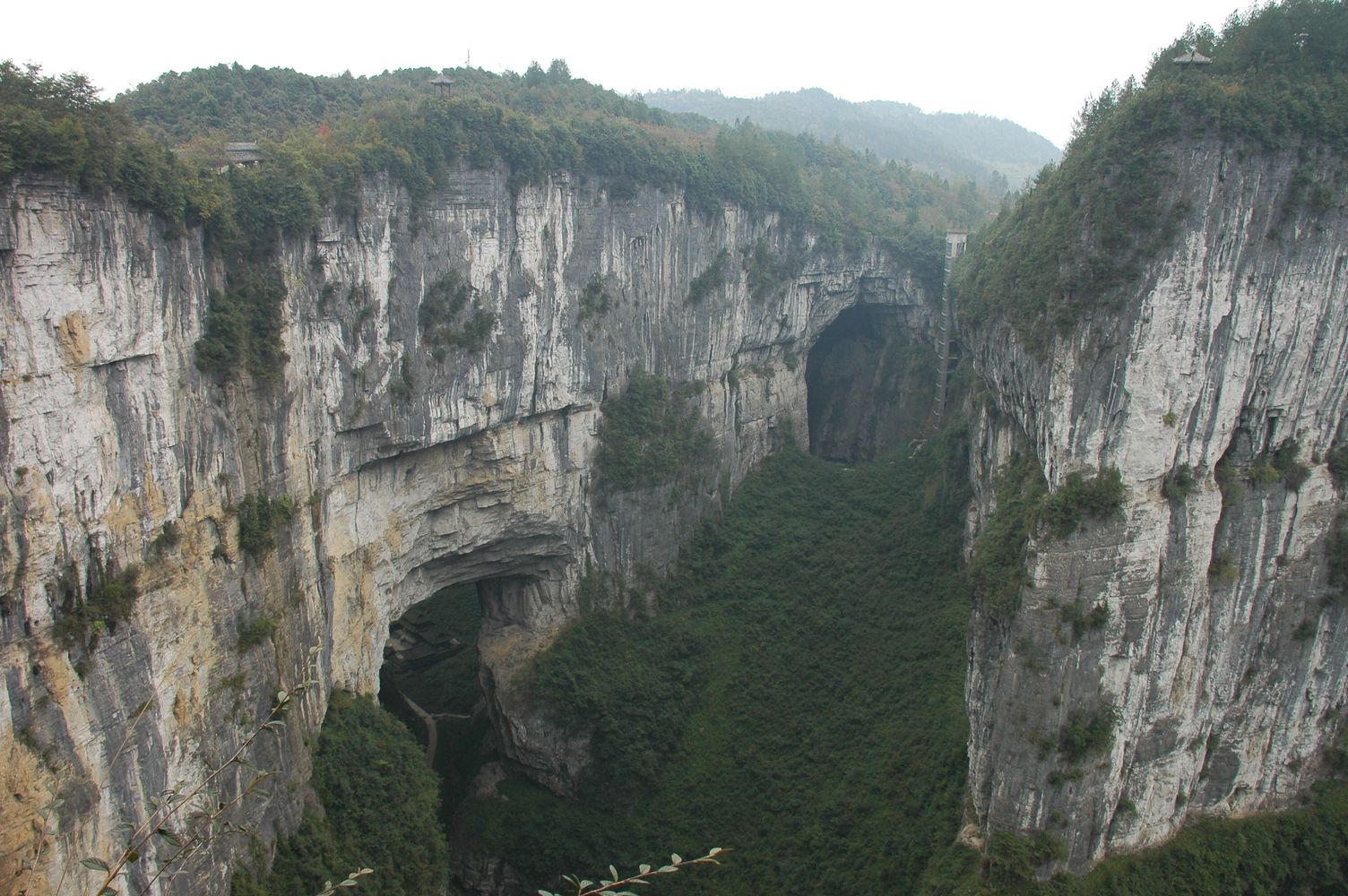
The Three Natural Bridges.

The Three Natural Bridges (simplified Chinese: 天生三桥; traditional Chinese: 天生三橋; pinyin: Tiānshēng Sān Qiáo) are a series of natural limestone bridges located in Xiannüshan Town (仙女山镇), Wulong District, Chongqing Municipality, China. They lie within the Wulong Karst National Geology Park, itself a part of the South China Karst-Wulong Karst UNESCO World Heritage Site. In Chinese, the bridges are all named after dragons, namely Tianlong (Chinese: 天龙桥; lit. 'Sky Dragon') Qinglong (青龙桥; 'Azure Dragon') and Heilong (黑龙桥; 'Black Dragon').

== Description ==
Three Natural Bridges (Chongqing)

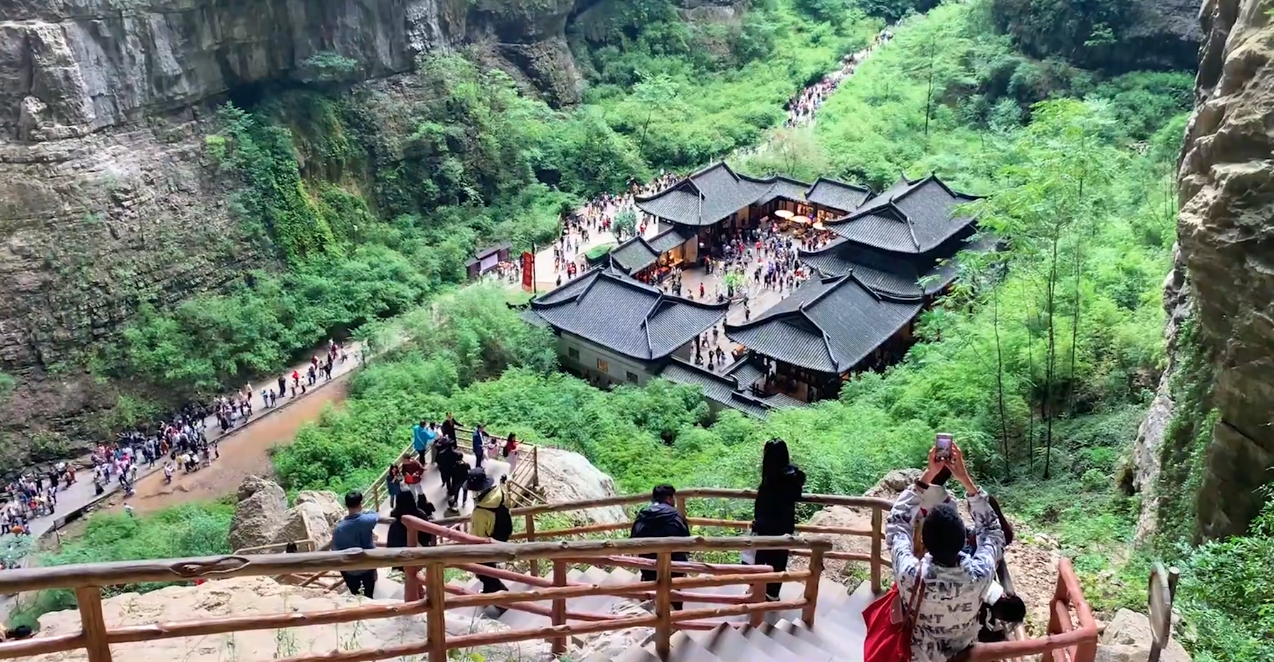
In 2024, it's a popular mass tourism destination.

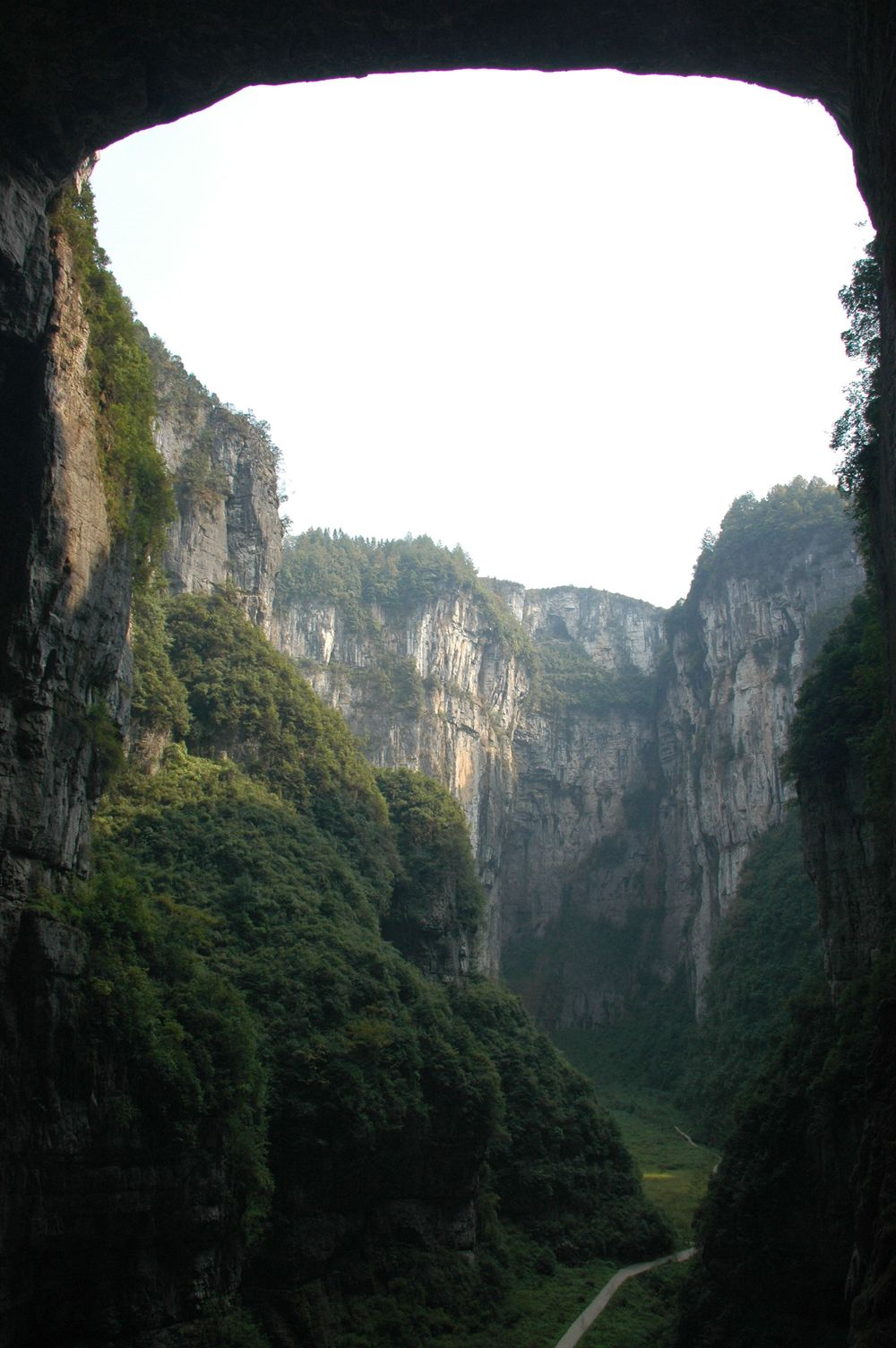
The Tianlong Bridge.

Spanning the Yangshui River, a tributary of the Wu River, the bridges are at the centre of a 20 km^{2} (7.7 sq mi) conservation area which also includes:

- Qinglong Tiankeng (青龙天坑);
- Shenying Tiankeng (神鹰天坑);
- Yangshui River Karst Canyon (羊水河喀斯特峡谷);
- Longshui Gorge (龙水峡地缝);
- Central Shiyuan Tiankeng (中石院天坑);
- Lower Shiyuan Tiankeng (下石院天坑);
- Seventy-two Branch Cave (七十二岔洞);
- Longquan Cave (龙泉洞);
- Immortal Cave (仙人洞);
- Hidden Monkey Stream (猴子坨伏流);
- Hidden Baiguo Stream (白果伏流).

Given that the distance between the upper end of the Tianlong Bridge and the lower end of the Heilong Bridge is only 1,500 m (4,900 ft), these are not the longest natural bridges. Between the bridges lie the Qinglong and Shenying tiankengs which have a depth of 276–285 metres and a circumference of 300–522 metres.

== Dimensions ==
	Height	Thickness	Width	Clearance	Span
Tianlong Bridge (天龙桥)	235 metres (771 ft)	150 metres (490 ft)	147 metres (482 ft)	96 metres (315 ft)	34 metres (112 ft)
Qinglong Bridge (青龙桥)	281 metres (922 ft)	168 metres (551 ft)	124 metres (407 ft)	103 metres (338 ft)	31 metres (102 ft)
Heilong Bridge (黑龙桥)	223 metres (732 ft)	107 metres (351 ft)	193 metres (633 ft)	116 metres (381 ft)	28 metres (92 ft)

== See also ==
- Wulong Karst
- Furong Cave
- Xueyu Cave
- Tianmen Mountain
