= Chongqing Xiannüshan Airport =

Chongqing Xiannüshan Airport 重庆仙女山机场
- IATA: CQW; ICAO: ZUWL

Summary
- Airport type: Public
- Serves: Wulong District, Chongqing, China
- Location: Xiannüshan Town
- Opened: December 18, 2020; 5 years ago
- Elevation AMSL: 1,746.5 m / 5,730 ft
- Coordinates: 29°27′57″N 107°41′32″E

Map
- Location of airport in Chongqing

Runways
Direction	Length		Surface
Direction	m	ft	Surface
01/19	2,800	9,186

Statistics (2021)
- Passengers: 47,433
- Aircraft movements: 602
- Cargo (metric tons): 1
- Source: IATA, CNAIR

Chongqing Xiannüshan Airport
- Simplified Chinese: 重庆仙女山机场
- Traditional Chinese: 重慶仙女山機場
Transcriptions
Standard Mandarin
- Hanyu Pinyin: Chóngqìng Xiānnǚshān Jīchǎng

Chongqing Xiannvshan Airport or Chongqing Xiannüshan Airport (IATA: CQW, ICAO: ZUWL) is an airport that serves Wulong, Chongqing municipality, China. The airport is located in the town of Xiannüshan (仙女山), also spelled as Xiannyushan or Xiannvshan, 20 kilometres (12 mi) north of the urban center of Wulong District, it is expected to mainly serve tourists visiting the Wulong Karst landscape, a UNESCO World Heritage Site. Construction began in 2014 and lasted five years, with an estimated total cost of 1.333 billion yuan (about $145 million).

The airport opened on December 18, 2020.

== Facilities ==
Chongqing Xiannvshan Airport has a 2,800-meter-long runway (class 4C), occupying an area of 3,476 mu.

== Airlines and destinations ==
Airlines	Destinations
China Southern Airlines	Beijing–Daxing, Guangzhou
West Air	Nanjing

== See also ==
- List of airports in China
- List of the busiest airports in China
