= San Wang Dong =

Karst cave in Chongqing, China

San Wang Dong is a large karst cave in the Wulong Karst formation region, located within Wulong County of Chongqing Municipality in China.

== Geography ==
The current known combined length of its passages is 67,825 metres (222,523 ft) long. San Wang Dong has numerous large cave rooms and passages, many of which are almost intact.

San Wang Dong cave lies close to another huge Wulong Karst cave named Er Wang Dong. San Wang Dong is located lower than Er Wang Dong, and both caves might be connected.

San Wang Dong was known to local people, although its exploration only began around a decade ago. The first major scientific exploration of the cave was organized by the international Hong Meigui Cave Exploration Society.

== See also ==
- Caves of Chongqing
- Karst formations of China
- List of caves in China
- List of Karst caves
