= Golden Buddha =

Golden Buddha may refer to:

- Golden Buddha (statue), a statue of Buddha in Bangkok, Thailand
- Golden Buddha Mountain, a mountain in Chongqing, China
- Golden Buddha (novel), a 2003 novel by Clive Cussler
- The Golden Buddha, a 1966 Hong Kong film
