= Hemirrhagus billsteelei =

Scientific classification
- Kingdom: Animalia
- Phylum: Arthropoda
- Subphylum: Chelicerata
- Class: Arachnida
- Order: Araneae
- Infraorder: Mygalomorphae
- Family: Theraphosidae
- Genus: Hemirrhagus
- Species: H. billsteelei

Binomial name
- Hemirrhagus billsteelei Mendoza & Francke 2018

Hemirrhagus billsteelei is a tarantula in the Hemirrhagus genus of Mexican cave tarantulas. This tarantula is found in the Mexican state of Oaxaca. This tarantula was first described by Mendoza and Francke in 2018, and is named in honour of Bill Steele, because of his contributions of knowledge in Mexican caves.

== Description ==
This tarantula is purely black in colour, with some grey tones. It has a slender body, as it is advantageous for traversing through crevices. It can be distinguished from all other Hemirrhagus species, with the exception of Hemirrhagus perezmiles, in that it lacks tibial apophyses. It can be distinguished from the Hemirrhagus perezmiles as the shape of male palpal bulb is different. This tarantula can be found 100 m (330 ft) below the Cueva La Grieta entrance. Further inside the same cave Hemirrhagus grieta is found, but at a much deeper level, from about 200–800 m (660–2,620 ft) in, but the grieta tarantula is thinner and more slender, and a different colour.
