= Furong Cave =

Karst cave in People's Republic of China

Furong Cave 芙蓉洞
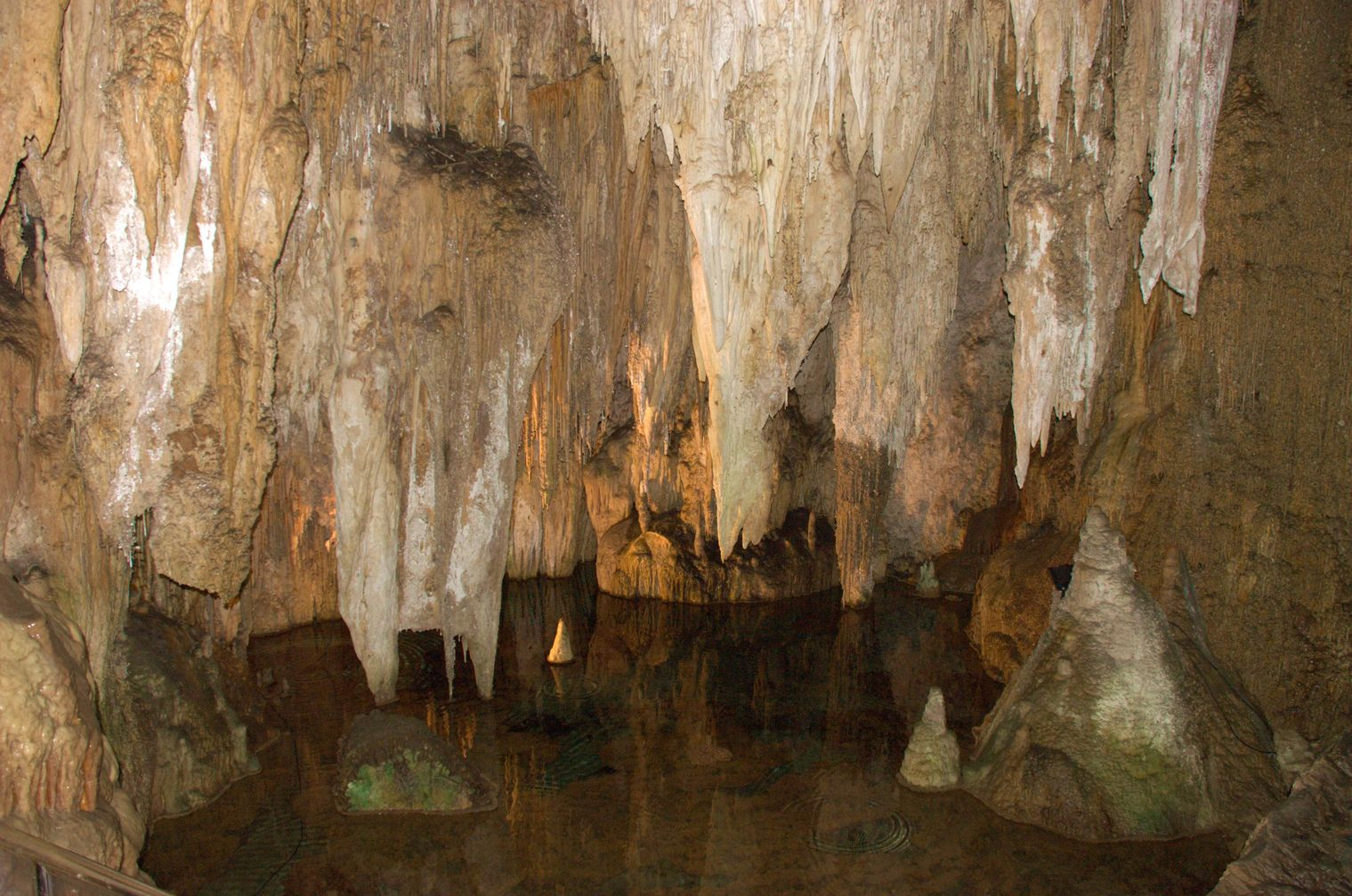
- Stalactites in the Furong Cave

- Location within Chongqing
- Location: Wulong District, Chongqing
- Coordinates: 29°13′10″N 107°54′35″E
- Length: 2.846 km (1.768 mi)

UNESCO World Heritage Site
- Official name: Part of the South China Karst
- Reference: 1248-007
- Inscription: 2006 (30th Session)

Furong Cave (Chinese: 芙蓉洞) is a karst cave located on the banks of the Furong River, 20 km (12 mi) from the seat of Wulong District, Chongqing, People's Republic of China.

== History ==
First discovered by local farmers in 1993 the cave was opened to tourists in 1994. It became a national 4A tourist site in 2002 then in June 2006 part of the South China Karst UNESCO World Heritage Site, the only cave in China on the UNESCO list.

In August 1994, the Sino-British-American joint expedition carried out scientific investigation on the huge cave group of Furong Cave, and in August 1996, the Sino-British joint expedition again carried out scientific investigation on the Furong Cave group of Wulong. On June 15, 2001, the Sino-British-American joint expedition team of 19 members stationed at the base camp of Furong Cave scientific research activities. on June 16, the team formally carried out scientific investigation on the huge cave group of Furong Cave within a radius of about 100 square kilometers of Furong Cave. After nearly five days of painstaking exploration, the huge underground river water system of Furong Cave Group was initially explored.

On July 6, 2011, Furong Cave Scenic Area was officially approved by the National Tourism Administration as a National AAAAA (5A) Scenic Spot. On June 27, 2012, Furong Cave in Wulong, China officially established sisterhood relationship with Crams Cave in France.

== Description ==
Furong Cave has a total length of 2,846 m (9,337 ft) and a width varying from 30 m (98 ft)–50 m (160 ft). Inside, the cave is divided into three sections, with the first featuring colorful subterranean features. The remaining two areas focus on the science of cave formation. There are more than 30 features inside the cave including the 15.76 m (51.7 ft), 21.04 m (69.0 ft) stone waterfall (巨型石) at the foot of which coral-like projections extend to 120 cm (47 in).

In the vicinity of the cave spread over a total area of around 20 km^{2} (7.7 sq mi), there are more than 50 vertical shafts with a depth of over 100 m (330 ft). including the 920 m (3,020 ft) deep Steam Shaft (汽坑洞), the deepest in Asia.

Formed during the Cambrian/Ordovician Periods some 500 million years ago, the cave features numerous rarely found speleothems including coral and dog-tooth like crystalline calcite flowers as well as a variety of helictites, and crystalline gypsum flowers.

On December 10, 2023, the Wulong Furong River Gondola goes into operation.

== See also ==
- Xueyu Cave
- Three Natural Bridges
- South China Karst
