= Xiangkou =

Xiangkou 巷口镇
- Town
- Location within China
- Coordinates: 29°19′46″N 107°44′16″E
- Country: China
- Municipality: Chongqing
- District: Wulong District

Area
  - Total: 139.1 km^{2} (53.7 sq mi)

Population (2010)
  - Total: 78,225
  - Density: 562.4/km^{2} (1,457/sq mi)
- Time zone: UTC+8 (China Standard)

Xiangkou (Chinese: 巷口镇) is a town located in the Wulong District of Chongqing, China.

== See also ==
- List of township-level divisions of Chongqing
