= Hemirrhagus diablo =

Scientific classification
- Kingdom: Animalia
- Phylum: Arthropoda
- Subphylum: Chelicerata
- Class: Arachnida
- Order: Araneae
- Infraorder: Mygalomorphae
- Family: Theraphosidae
- Genus: Hemirrhagus
- Species: H. diablo

Binomial name
- Hemirrhagus diablo Mendoza & Francke, 2018

Species of spider

Hemirrhagus diablo is a tarantula in the Hemirrhagus genus, it is found in Mexico, in several caves in the state of Morelos. It is named after a cave it is found in, "Cueva del diablo" which translated to "Devil's cave", diablo being devil. This tarantula was first described by Mendoza & Francke in 2018.

== Description ==
Hemirrhagus diablo can be distinguished from most other Hemirrhagus tarantulas by having the urticating hairs arranged in two para median patches, which are brown in color. And by the shape of the male palpal bulb with a narrow base. The tarantula is dark brown in color with either some darker or whiter patches. Spiderlings are dark brown in color with some orange coloration in the para median patches.

== Habitat ==
This tarantula is found in "Cueva del diablo", it is named as such after a legend. The cave is about 2 km long, in some of the deeper areas it is necessary to bring equipment to breathe, as there is a lack of oxygen. In this cave several prehispanic cultural items have been found. This cave is found in the Ajusco mountains. The Ajusco area have forest, mountain grasslands and alpine vegetation, the rocks are from the Quaternary period with batholith and igneous rocks.

The legend is as follows: Near the cave appears an old man, who ask the naive travelers who pass there to follow him to the interior. In the beginning all seems calm, but the deeper they go, the more they notice that the old man is the devil himself.
