= Baima, Chongqing =

Baima 白马镇
- Town
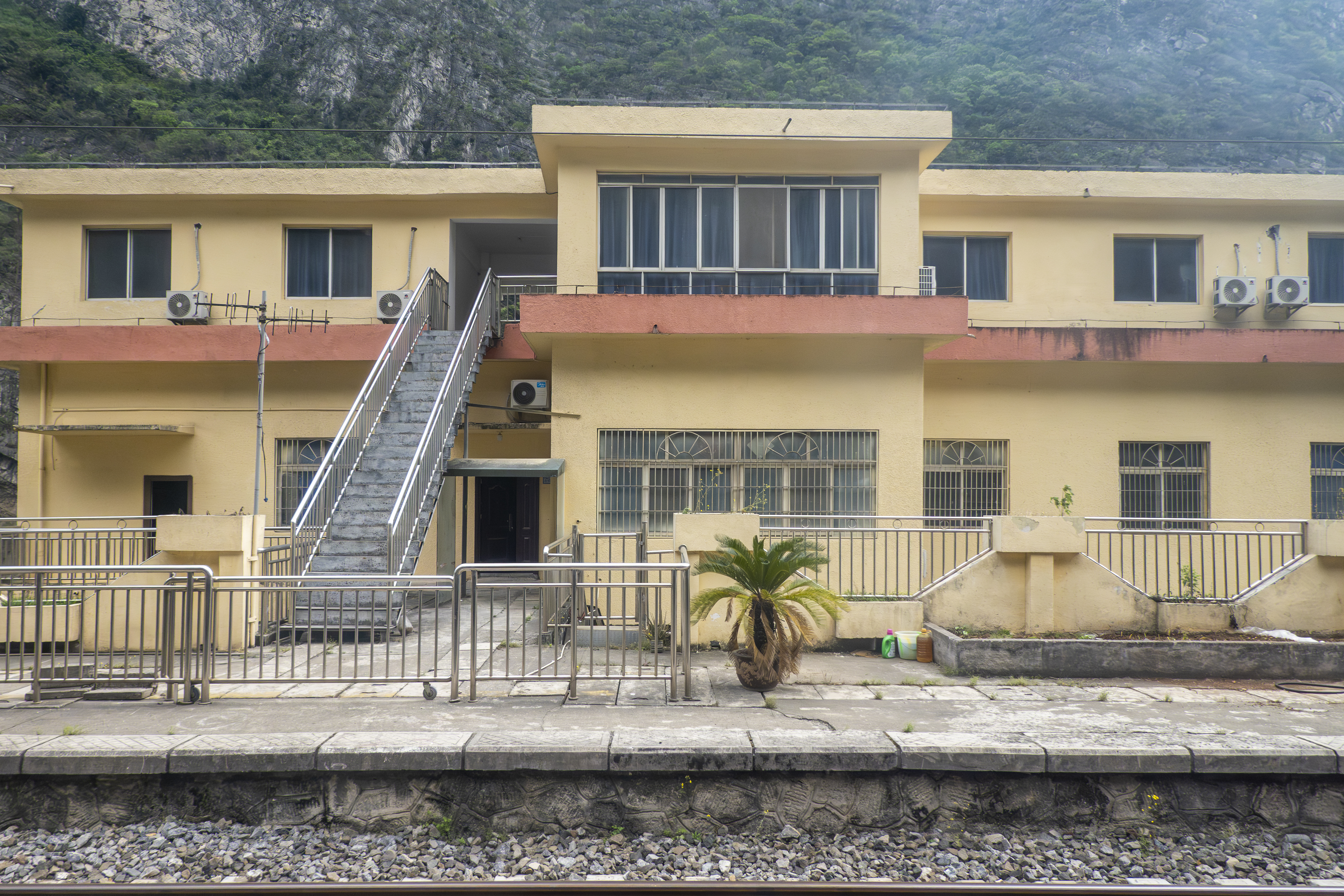
- Baima Railway Station (2025)

- Location in Chongqing
- Coordinates: 29°24′15″N 107°32′11″E
- Country: People's Republic of China
- Municipality: Chongqing
- District: Wulong District
- Village-level divisions: 2 residential communities 10 villages
- Elevation: 275 m (902 ft)
- Time zone: UTC+8 (China Standard)
- Area code: 0023

Baima (simplified Chinese: 白马; traditional Chinese: 白馬; pinyin: Báimǎ; lit. 'white horse') is a town of northwestern Wulong District in southeastern Chongqing Municipality, People's Republic of China, situated on the southern (left) bank of the Wu River downstream from the county seat, which lies 23 kilometres (14 mi) to the southeast as the crow flies, and 95 km (59 mi) east-southeast of downtown Chongqing. As of 2020, it has two residential neighborhoods and ten villages under its administration:

Neighborhoods

- Liufangping Community (六方坪社区)
- Tiefosi Community (铁佛寺社区)

Villages

- Tiefo Village (铁佛村)
- Banqiao Village (板桥村)
- Dongsheng Village (东升村)
- Lingshan Village (灵山村)
- Sanxi Village (三溪村)
- Shatai Village (沙台村)
- Yuguang Village (鱼光村)
- Yangliu Village (杨柳村)
- Baoyan Village (豹岩村)
- Chepan Village (车盘村)

== See also ==
- List of township-level divisions of Chongqing
