= Hemirrhagus akheronteus =

Scientific classification
- Kingdom: Animalia
- Phylum: Arthropoda
- Subphylum: Chelicerata
- Class: Arachnida
- Order: Araneae
- Infraorder: Mygalomorphae
- Family: Theraphosidae
- Genus: Hemirrhagus
- Species: H. akheronteus

Binomial name
- Hemirrhagus akheronteus Mendoza & Francke, 2018

Mexican spider

Hemirrhagus akheronteus is a tarantula which is part of the Hemirrhagus genus. It is found in Mexico, in the state of Queretaro, and is one of many Mexican cave tarantulas. It was first described by Mendoza and Francke in 2018. It is named after the latin word akheronteus, which means "pertaining to the stream of woe", referring to the acheron river in the infernal regions of Greek mythology.

== Characteristics ==
The tarantula's color is a solid grey or even black, making it blend in well with rocks. This tarantula, although being from the New World, lacks urticating hairs. Males have thornlike hairs on their legs, which are attached to a socket and are mobile. Females lack these hairs. The specimens of this investigation were captured 400m from the cave entrance.

== Habitat ==
They are found in the cave in the state of Queretaro in the Jalpan de Serra town, inside the cave "Cueva del Río Jalpan". This cave is found in the middle of the Sierra Gorda natural reserve. In the reserve there is mostly cretaceous rocks, with sedimentary and conglomerates rocks. The reserve is from 300m to 3,100m above sea level, most of it being between 1,300m and 2,400m. The reserve has semi warm to sub humid climates.
