= Tongzi, Chongqing =

Tongzi 桐梓镇
- Town
- Location in Chongqing
- Coordinates: 29°33′35″N 107°57′12″E
- Country: People's Republic of China
- Direct-administered municipality: Chongqing
- District: Wulong District
- Time zone: UTC+8 (China Standard)

Tongzi (Chinese: 桐梓; pinyin: Tóngzǐ) is a town in Wulong District, Chongqing, China. As of 2020, it administers Tongxin Community (同心社区) and the following six villages:

- Tongzi Village
- Xiangshu Village (香树村)
- Guantian Village (官田村)
- Fanrong Village (繁荣村)
- Changzheng Village (长征村)
- Shuangfeng Village (双凤村)

== See also ==
- List of township-level divisions of Chongqing
