= Huolu, Chongqing =

Huolu 火炉镇
- Town
- Location within Chongqing Location within China
- Coordinates: 29°23′44″N 107°52′23″E
- Country: China
- Municipality: Chongqing
- District: Wulong District

Area
  - Total: 184.1 km^{2} (71.1 sq mi)

Population (2010)
  - Total: 25,818
  - Density: 140.2/km^{2} (363.2/sq mi)
- Time zone: UTC+8 (China Standard)

Huolu (Chinese: 火炉镇; pinyin: Huǒlú Zhèn) is a town located in the Wulong District of Chongqing, China.

== See also ==
- List of township-level divisions of Chongqing
