= Er Wang Dong =

Large cave in Wulong Karst region in Chongqing, China

- Location: Houping Township, Wulong County, Chongqing, China
- Depth: 441 m
- Length: 42,139 m

Er Wang Dong (Chinese: 二王洞; lit. 'Second Royal Cave') is a large cave in the Wulong Karst region, in Wulong County of Chongqing Municipality of China.

Current known length of its passages is 42,139 metres (138,251 ft) with a maximum depth of 441 m (1,447 ft). It is large enough to contain its own weather system. The cave starts in the 195 m (640 ft) deep Niubizi tiankeng (牛鼻子天坑; "ox nose sinkhole") and also contains the 295 m (968 ft) deep Qingkou tiankeng.

Er Wang Dong cave has formed in Lower Ordovician limestone and is located close to another very large cave system - San Wang Dong.

Both caves were explored by Hong Meigui Cave Exploration Society. Local people make weather forecasts based on the observations in Niubizi tiankeng - if there is a fog coming from the cave, rain is expected.

== See also ==
- Karst caves
- Karst formations of China
- List of caves in China
