= Hemirrhagus =

Scientific classification
- Kingdom: Animalia
- Phylum: Arthropoda
- Subphylum: Chelicerata
- Class: Arachnida
- Order: Araneae
- Infraorder: Mygalomorphae
- Family: Theraphosidae
- Genus: Hemirrhagus; Simon, 1903

Type species
- H. cervinus (Simon, 1891)

Species
- 27, see text

Synonyms
- Spelopelma Gertsch, 1982

Genus of spiders

Hemirrhagus is a genus of Mexican tarantulas that was first described by Eugène Louis Simon in 1903. It is considered a senior synonym of Spelopelma. Species of the genus Hemirrhagus are 5 to 12 cm long, usually black in colour, the urticating hairs on the opisthosoma are arranged in one dorsomedian patch, two dorsal paramedian patches, or two lateral patches. It is unique amongst the theraphosine genera because of the retrolateral coxal heels, the shape of the male palpal bulb, and the urticating hairs on the abdomen are reduced or completely missing. It is the only genus with epigean, troglophile and troglobitic species.

== Distribution ==
Hemirrhagus tarantulas are all found in Mexico all of them are largely distributed from Tamaulipas in the north to Chiapas in the south, primarily in the mountainous regions of Sierra Madre Oriental, Eje Volcánico Transversal, Sierra Norte de Oaxaca, and Sierra Madre Sur. All of these tarantulas are found in individual caves, with multiple species living in the same cave. The species are found in cave systems between 100m to 1900m above sea level. Most of them are found in central Mexico and the northern part of south Mexico.

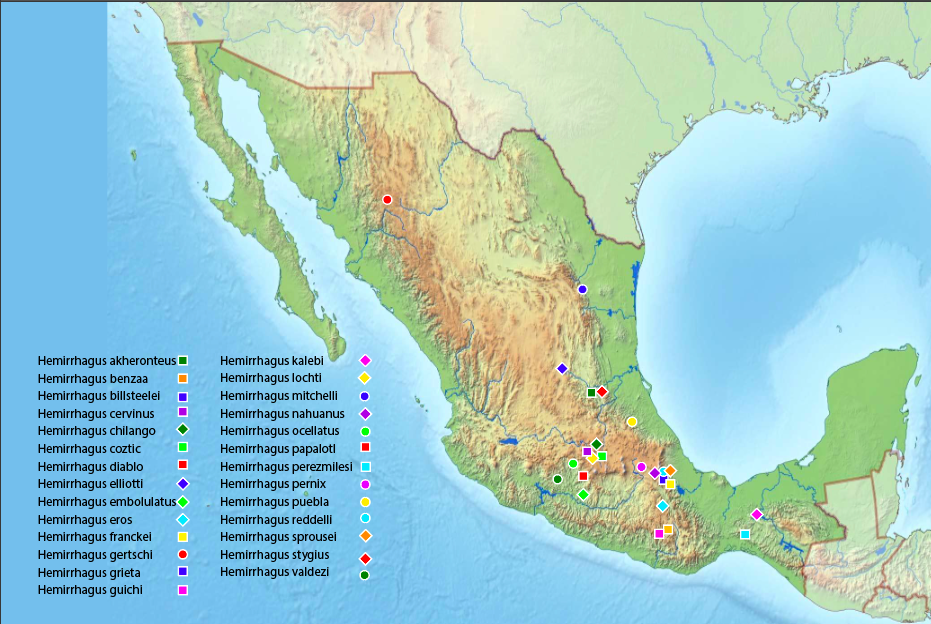
Distribution map of the Hemirrhagus genus, according to Frankle and Mendoza, and Tarantupedia

== Species ==
- As of March 2020 it contains twenty-seven species, all found in Mexico:
- Hemirrhagus akheronteus Mendoza & Francke, 2018 – Mexico
- Hemirrhagus benzaa Mendoza, 2014 – Mexico
- Hemirrhagus billsteelei Mendoza & Francke, 2018 – Mexico
- Hemirrhagus cervinus (Simon, 1891) (type) – Mexico
- Hemirrhagus chilango Pérez-Miles & Locht, 2003 – Mexico
- Hemirrhagus coztic Pérez-Miles & Locht, 2003 – Mexico
- Hemirrhagus diablo Mendoza & Francke, 2018 – Mexico
- Hemirrhagus elliotti (Gertsch, 1973) – Mexico
- Hemirrhagus embolulatus Mendoza, 2014 – Mexico
- Hemirrhagus eros Pérez-Miles & Locht, 2003 – Mexico
- Hemirrhagus franckei Mendoza, 2014 – Mexico
- Hemirrhagus gertschi Pérez-Miles & Locht, 2003 – Mexico
- Hemirrhagus grieta (Gertsch, 1982) – Mexico
- Hemirrhagus guichi Mendoza, 2014 – Mexico
- Hemirrhagus kalebi Mendoza & Francke, 2018 – Mexico
- Hemirrhagus lochti Estrada-Alvarez, 2014 – Mexico
- Hemirrhagus mitchelli (Gertsch, 1982) – Mexico
- Hemirrhagus nahuanus (Gertsch, 1982) – Mexico
- Hemirrhagus ocellatus Pérez-Miles & Locht, 2003 – Mexico
- Hemirrhagus papalotl Pérez-Miles & Locht, 2003 – Mexico
- Hemirrhagus perezmilesi García-Villafuerte & Locht, 2010 – Mexico
- Hemirrhagus pernix (Ausserer, 1875) – Mexico
- Hemirrhagus puebla (Gertsch, 1982) – Mexico
- Hemirrhagus reddelli (Gertsch, 1973) – Mexico
- Hemirrhagus sprousei Mendoza & Francke, 2018 – Mexico
- Hemirrhagus stygius (Gertsch, 1971) – Mexico
- Hemirrhagus valdezi Mendoza, 2014 – Mexico
