= Jiangkou Reservoir =

- Location within Chongqing
- Location: Wulong County, Chongqing Municipality
- Coordinates: 29°14′12″N 107°53′32″E
- Lake type: reservoir
- Primary inflows: Furong River
- Primary outflows: Furong River
- Basin countries: People's Republic of China
- Built: May 1999 - October 2003
- Average depth: 300 m (980 ft)
- Water volume: .497 km^{3} (0.119 cu mi)

The Jiangkou Reservoir (simplified Chinese: '江口水库; traditional Chinese: '江口水庫; pinyin: Jiāngkǒu Shuǐkù) is a large scale reservoir in Wulong County, Chongqing Municipality, People's Republic of China constructed for the primary purpose of generating hydroelectricity.

Built at a cost of 1.95 billion RMB, the reservoir's concrete hyperbolic arch dam in Jiankou Town (江口镇) 2 km (1.2 mi) from the confluence of the Wu and Furong Rivers houses a hydroelectric power plant with an installed capacity of 300 MW.
