= Furong River =

- Native name: 芙蓉江 (Chinese)

Location
- Country: People's Republic of China
- Region: Guizhou Province, Chongqing Municipality

Physical characteristics
- Source: Dalou Mountains
  - location: Guizhou ProvinceSuiyang County
- Mouth: Wu River
  - location: Jiangkou, Wulong County, Chongqing Municipality
  - coordinates: 29°14′27″N 107°52′35″E
- Length: 227 km (141 mi)
- Basin size: 7,744.5 km^{2} (2,990.2 sq mi)

Basin features
- River system: Wu River drainage system

The Furong River (Chinese: 芙蓉江), also known as the Pangu River (盘古河) is the largest tributary of the Wu River and flows through Guizhou Province and Chongqing Municipality, People's Republic of China.

== Description ==
Rising in the Dalou Mountains in Suiyang County, Guizhou Province, the river flows from the south west northeast to Chongqing where it joins the Wu River at Jiangkou Town (江口镇) in Wulong County. For 87% of its 227 km (141 mi) length it flows within the borders of Guizhou with the remainder in Chongqing. The Furong River has a natural drop of 1,075 metres (3,527 ft) and a total drainage basin covering 7,744.5 km^{2} (2,990.2 sq mi). With its relatively sparse human population, the typical karst topology drainage basin is well preserved whilst original vegetation remains intact on both sides of the river's V-shaped canyon. The Furong River National Park (芙蓉江风景名胜区) extends for 35 km (22 mi) from Jiangkou Town and encompasses 152.2 km^{2} (58.8 sq mi) of the original canyon. In 2002, the Chinese State Council listed the area as a National Park then in 2007 a section of the river became part of the South China Karst UNESCO World Heritage Site.

In 1991, a plan was announced for the development of a series of ten hydroelectric power stations on the Furong River at Zhulao Village (朱老村), Niandu (牛都), Tian Embankment (田坝), Liangtan (良坎), Shaqian (沙阡), Yutang (鱼塘), Shimenkan (石门坎), Haokou (浩口) and Jiangkou Reservoir.
