= Dalou Mountains =

Mountain range in China

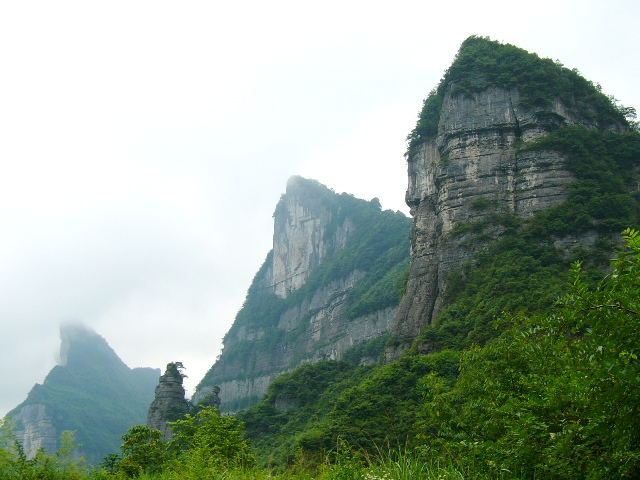
- South side of Mount Jinfo

Highest point
- Peak: Mount Jinfo (金佛山)
- Elevation: 2,251 m (7,385 ft)

Geography
- Location within China
- Country: China
- Provinces: Guizhou and Sichuan
- Range coordinates: 29°04′N 107°18′E

The Dalou Mountains (simplified Chinese: 大娄山; traditional Chinese: 大婁山) are a range of limestone mountains running 300 km (190 mi) north east to south west across the Yunnan–Guizhou Plateau spanning Guizhou and Sichuan Provinces, People's Republic of China. At 2,251 m (7,385 ft), Mount Jinfo (金佛山) in Nanchuan District, Chongqing is the highest peak in a range that is also the watershed between the Wu and Chishui rivers.
