= Mount Jinfo =

Mountain in China

- 金佛山
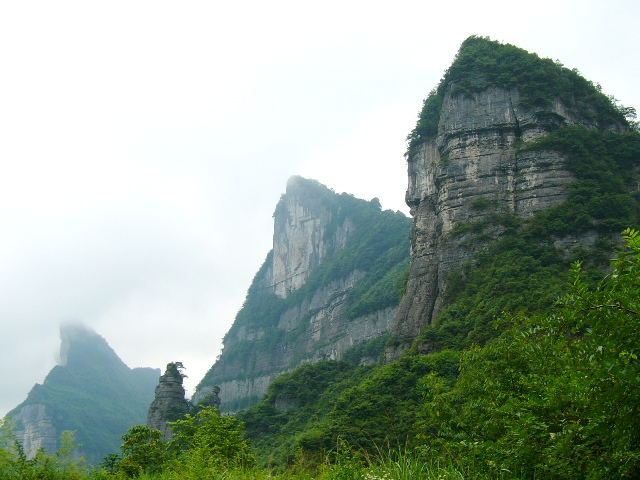
- A Glimpse at South Side of Mount Jinfo

Highest point
- Elevation: 2,238 m (7,343 ft)
- Prominence: 1,217 m (3,993 ft); Highest point Feng Chui Ling
- Listing: Ribu
- Coordinates: 29°04′N 107°18′E

Geography
- Location within China
- Location: Chongqing, China
- Parent range: Dalou Mountains

Jinfo Shan (Golden Buddha Mountain, Jinfoshan, Chin Shan, Jinfushan, Chin fu shan, chin fo shan, Chinese: 金佛山), the highest peak of Dalou Mountains, located in the upper reach of the Yangtze River, is situated in Nanchuan District, the Municipality of Chongqing. Jinfo Shan is an isolated mountain with cliffs up to 300 m surrounding its relatively flat top. Its major vegetation types include subtropical broadleaf forest, coniferous forests and subalpine meadow. Besides typical karst topography of gorges, stone forests and cave systems, Jinfo Shan is well known for its exceptional plant diversity of 4768 seed plants. The area may also be home to some of the few naturally occurring populations of Ginkgo biloba. It is also a refuge to endangered animals confined to karst regions such as Francois' Langur (Trachypithecus francoisi). With its outstanding karst features and superb biodiversity, Jinfo Shan was listed as a tentative World Heritage Site in 2001, and in 2014, the site was added as an extension to the South China Karst World Heritage Site.

== Geography ==
Mt. Jinfo is a syncline mountain. The platform and terrace are composed of Permian limestone in the upper part with about 2000m a.s.l. In the meanwhile, karst geomorphologies in large scale on the surface or underground are found. The shale and sandstone of Silurian lay in the middle of Jinfo from 1000m to 1500m asl.. The low part of Jinfo is supported by the limestone and dolomite of Cambrian and Ordovician. Plenty of small- and microforms of karst are formed in this area. There are many cliffs and gorges in Jinfo Mt., the north slope is steep and the south slope is slight. The geomorphology of the Jinfo can be divided into two types:

1. Gorge in the low part of Jinfo Mt. whose elevation is about 800-1200m asl and relative height about 500m. It formed by water down cutting and eroding.
2. Platform of Mid-mountain distributes the area above 1200m asl of Jinfo Mt., Bozhi Mt. and Qingba Mt.. The relative height is 500-1000m. The way of the mountain extension is identical to the tectonic line. The top of the Mts. is a relic erosional basis.

== Climate ==
It is in the subtropical humid monsoon zone with annual mean temperature of 8.2 °C and precipitation of 1,434.5 mm on the top of the mountain.
