= Snowy Jade Cave =

Cave in Chongqing, China

Coordinates: 29°46′58″N 107°47′53″E

Snow Jade Cave
- Xueyu Cave, Snowy White Cave
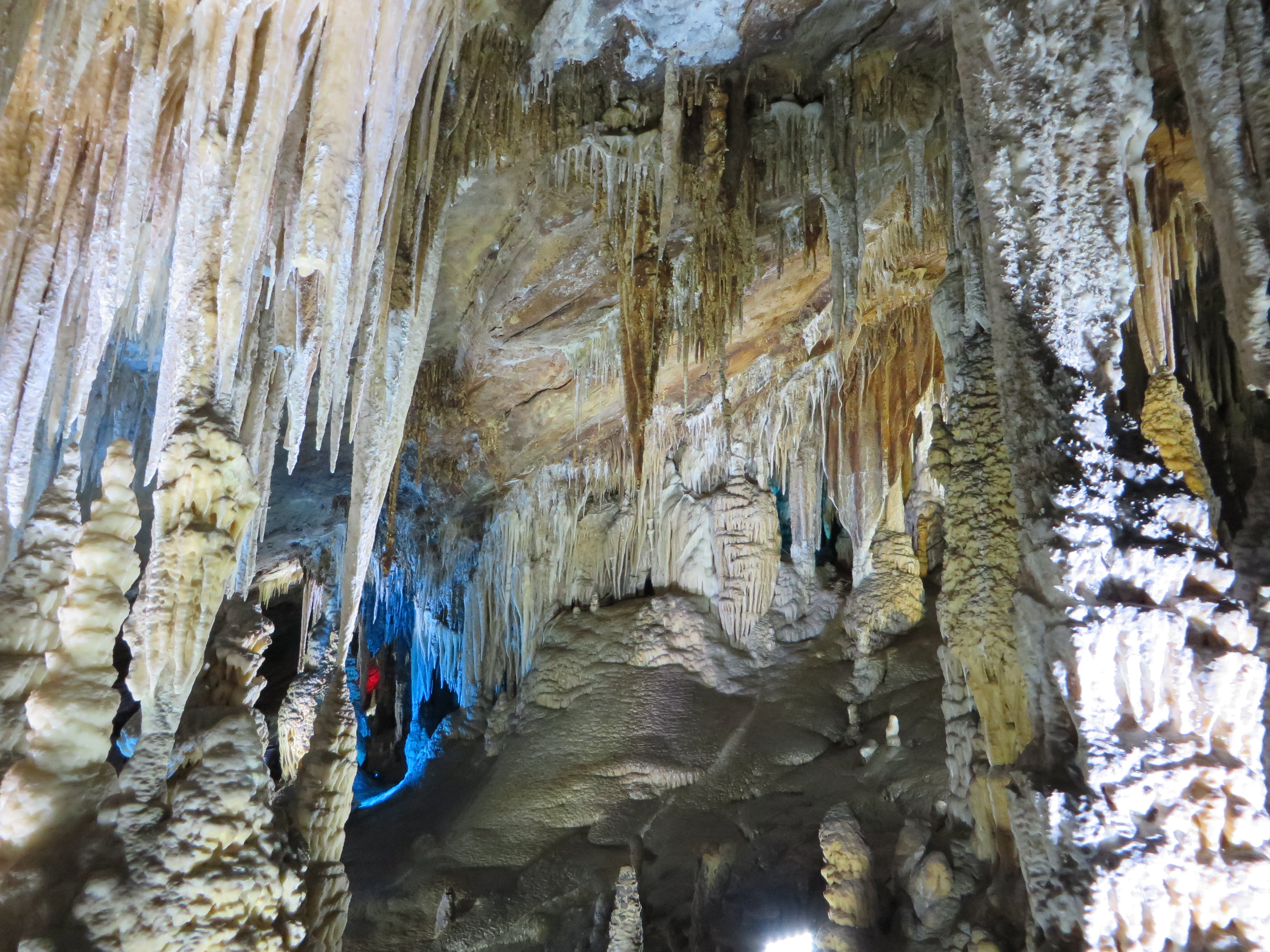
- Interior view in the cave.
- Interactive map of Snow Jade Cave
- Location: Chongqing Municipality, Fengdu County, Southwest China, China
- Length: 1.6 km (0.99 mi)
- Features: Stone King's Flag (石旗王); Stone King's Shield (石盾王)

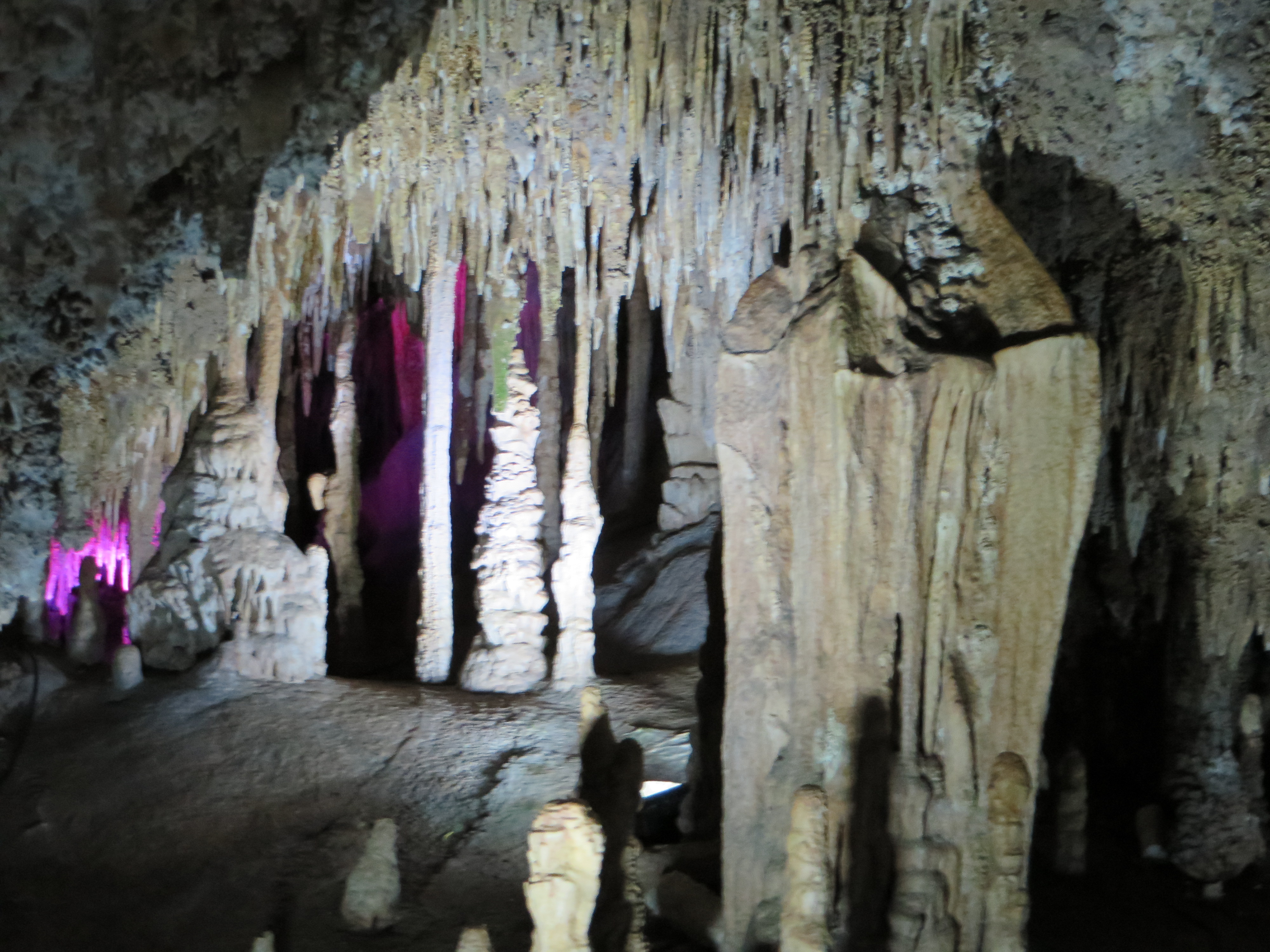
View in Snowy Jade Cave.

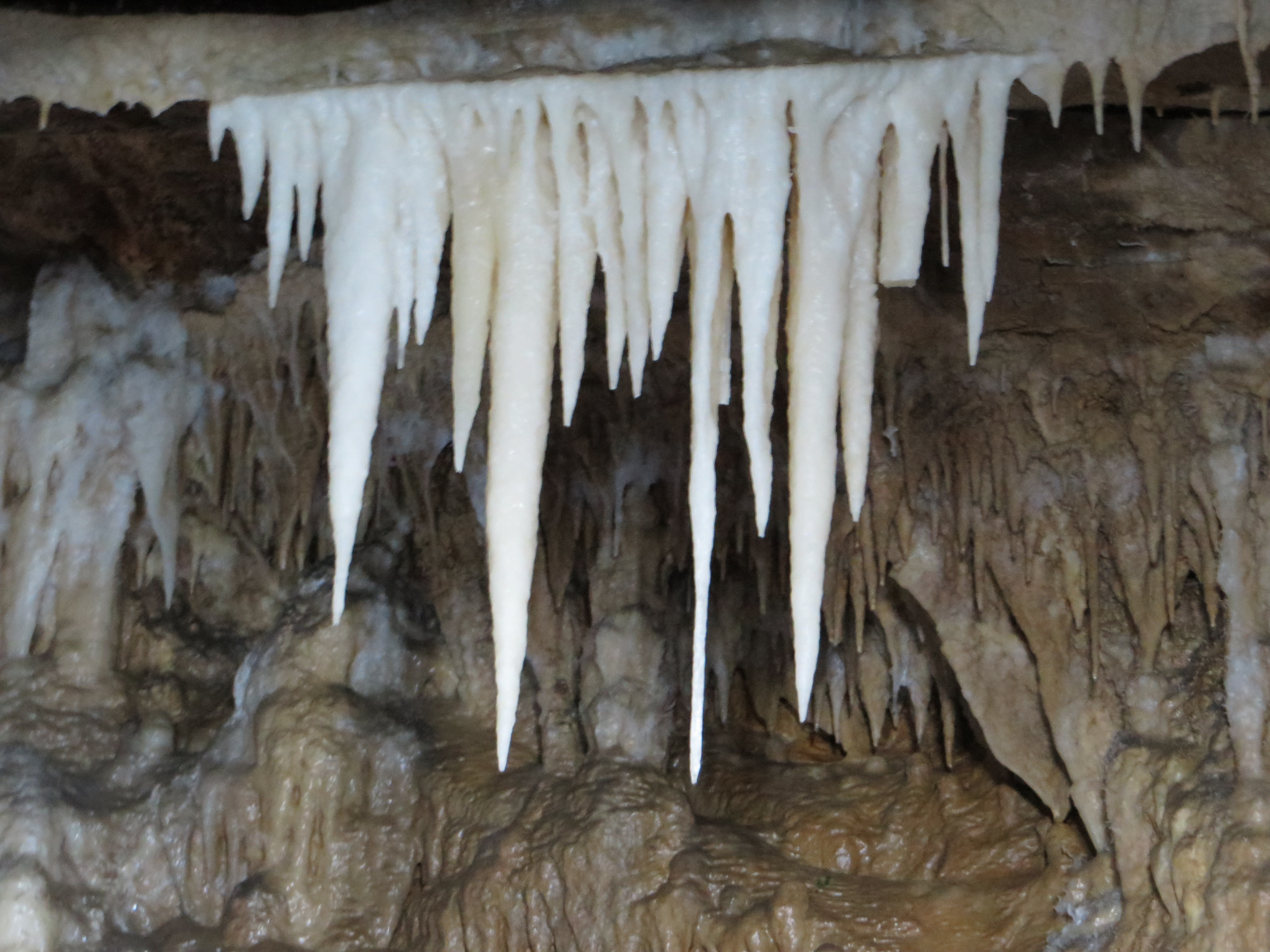
Stalactites in Snowy Jade Cave.

Snowy Jade Cave, Snow Jade Cave, or Xueyu Cave (Chinese: 雪玉洞; pinyin: Xuěyù Dòng; lit. 'Snow Jade Cave') is a National Three Gorges Scenic Area and a National 4A Scenic Area located in Fengdu County, Chongqing Municipality, People's Republic of China, not far from the Yangtze River.

== Description ==
Snowy Jade Cave (Chongqing)

The cave's interior is China's only pure-white, jade-like example. It continues to expand due to erosion in the surrounding karst landscape. 1,644 m (5,394 ft) long, of which 1,161 m (3,809 ft) have been explored, Snowy Jade Cave is spread over three levels. Inside, both the 8 m (26 ft) Stone King's Flag (石旗王) and the 4 m (13 ft) high Stone King's Shield (石盾王) features are the largest of their type in the world. There are also numerous examples of corals.

The surrounding area is also home to rare animal species including macaque, wild boar, and golden pheasant.

== See also ==
- Fengdu Ghost City, a nearby visitor attraction 12 km away
- Furong Cave
