= South China Karst =

UNESCO World Heritage Site
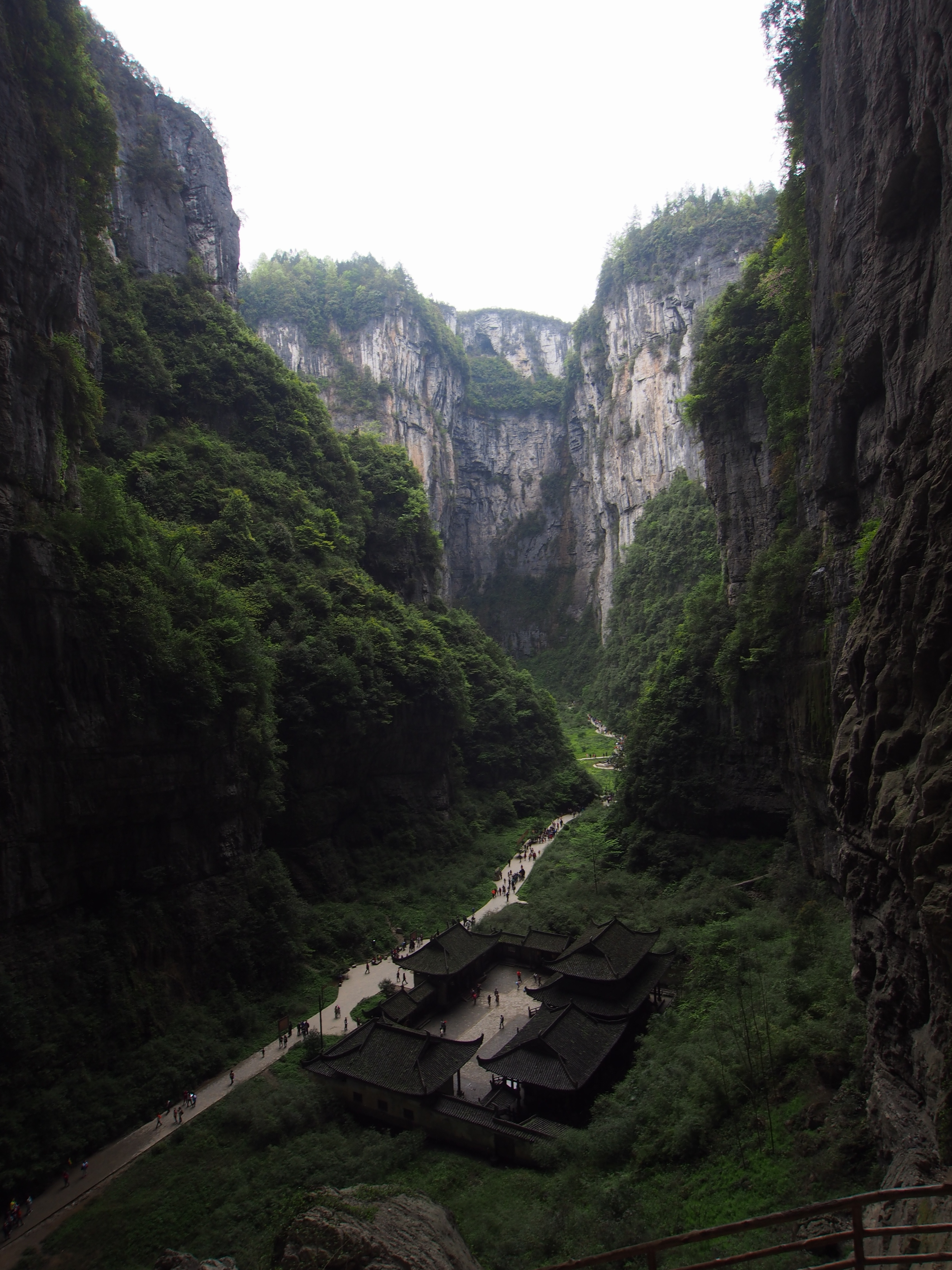
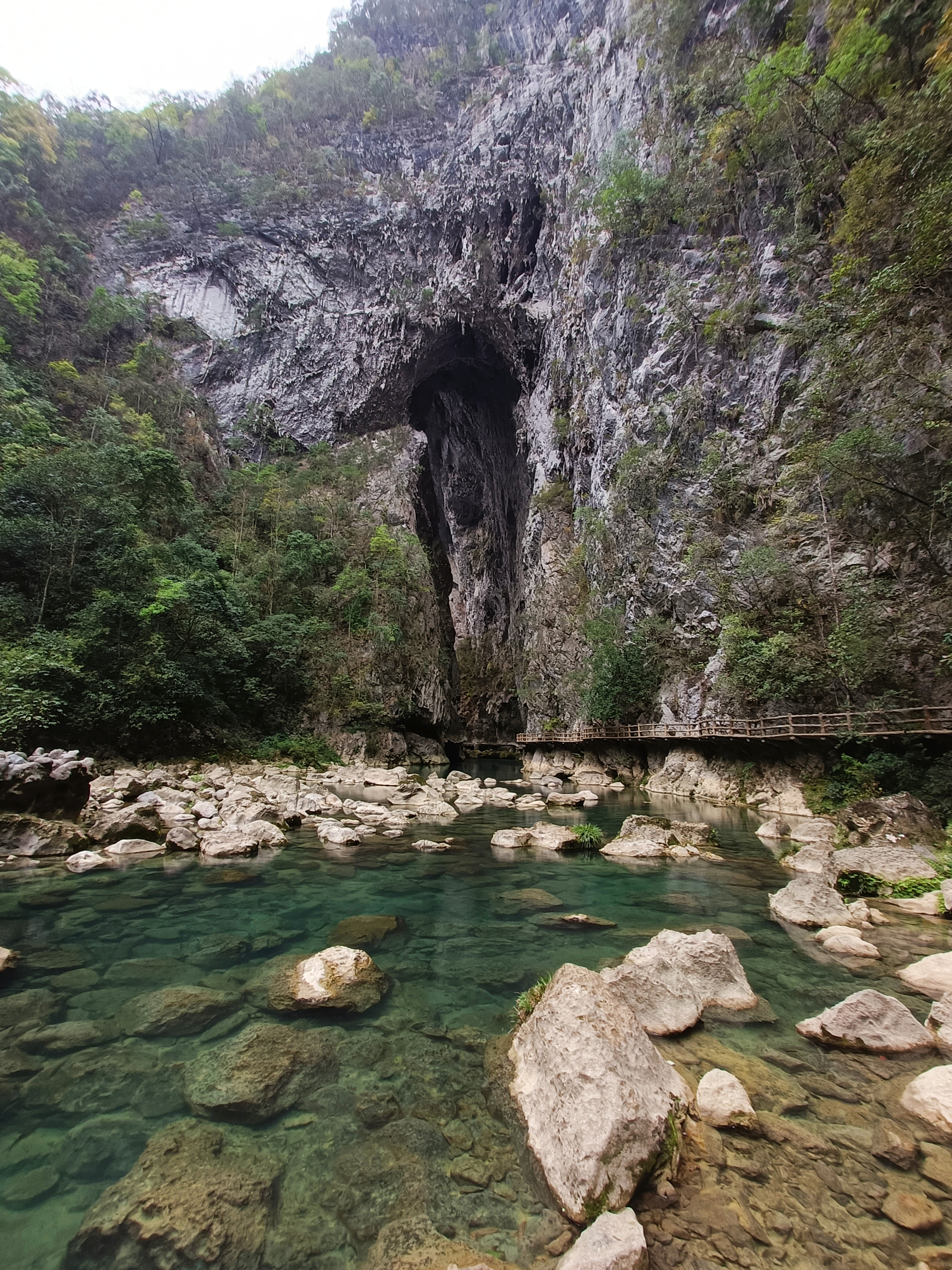
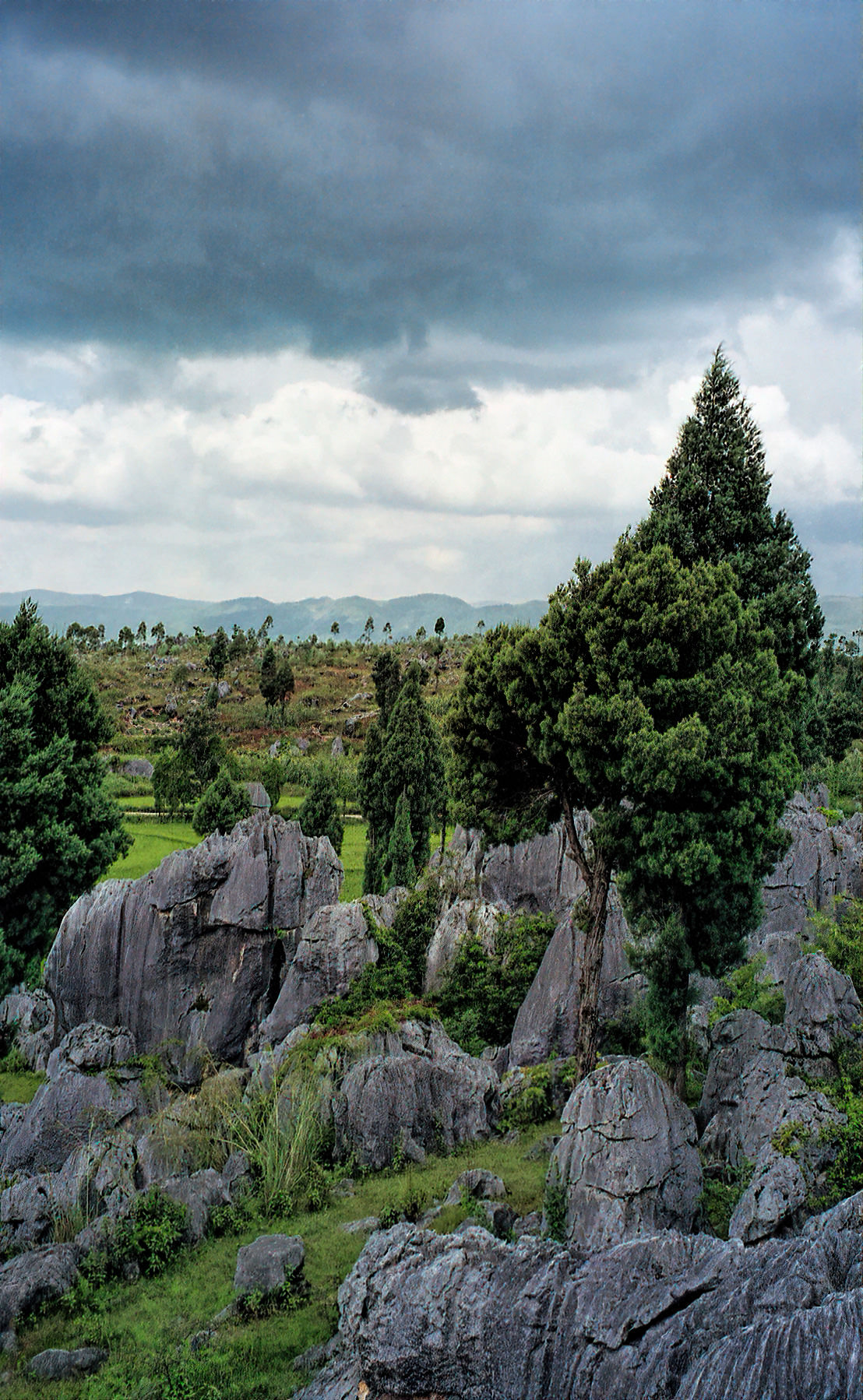
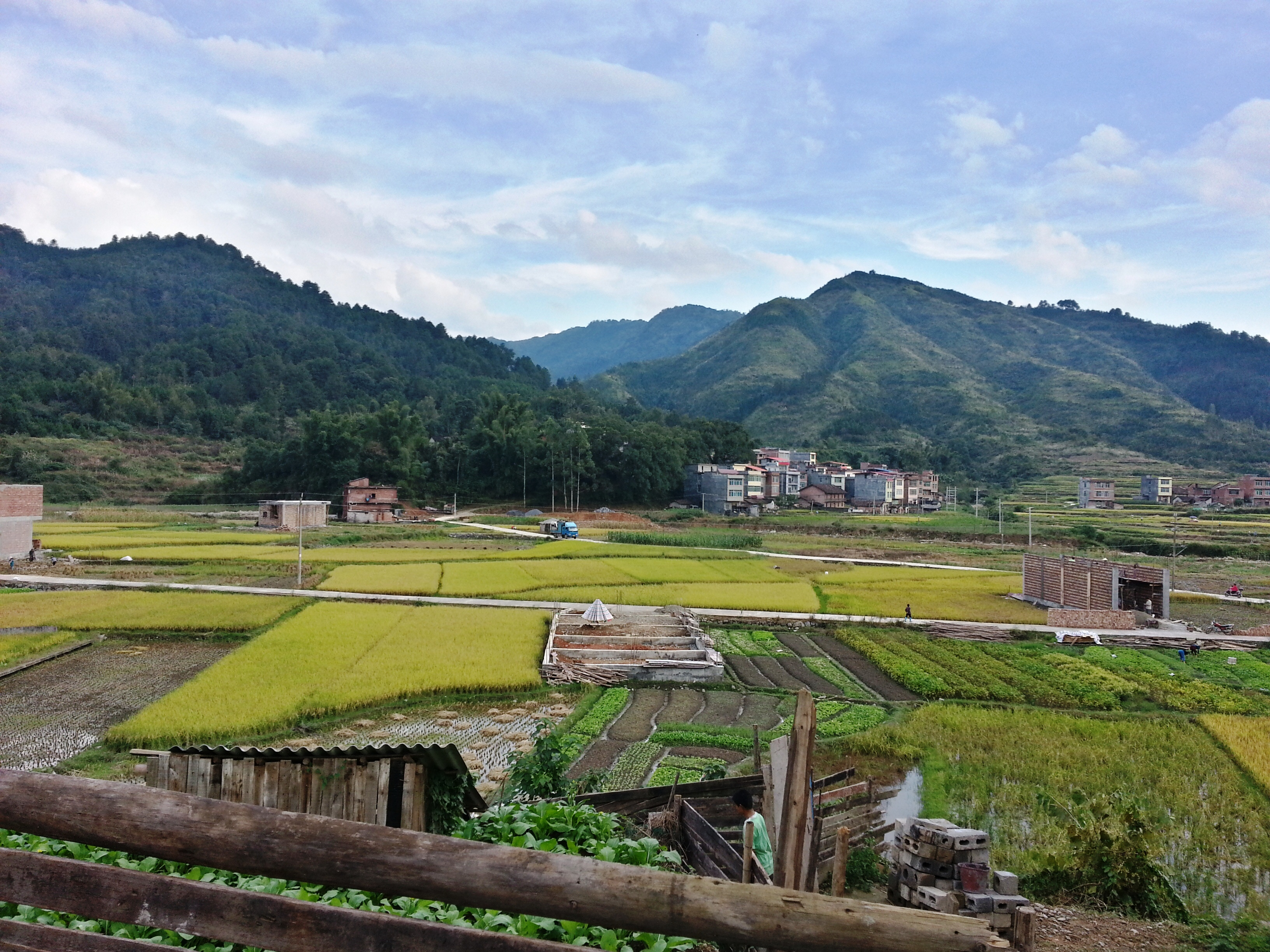
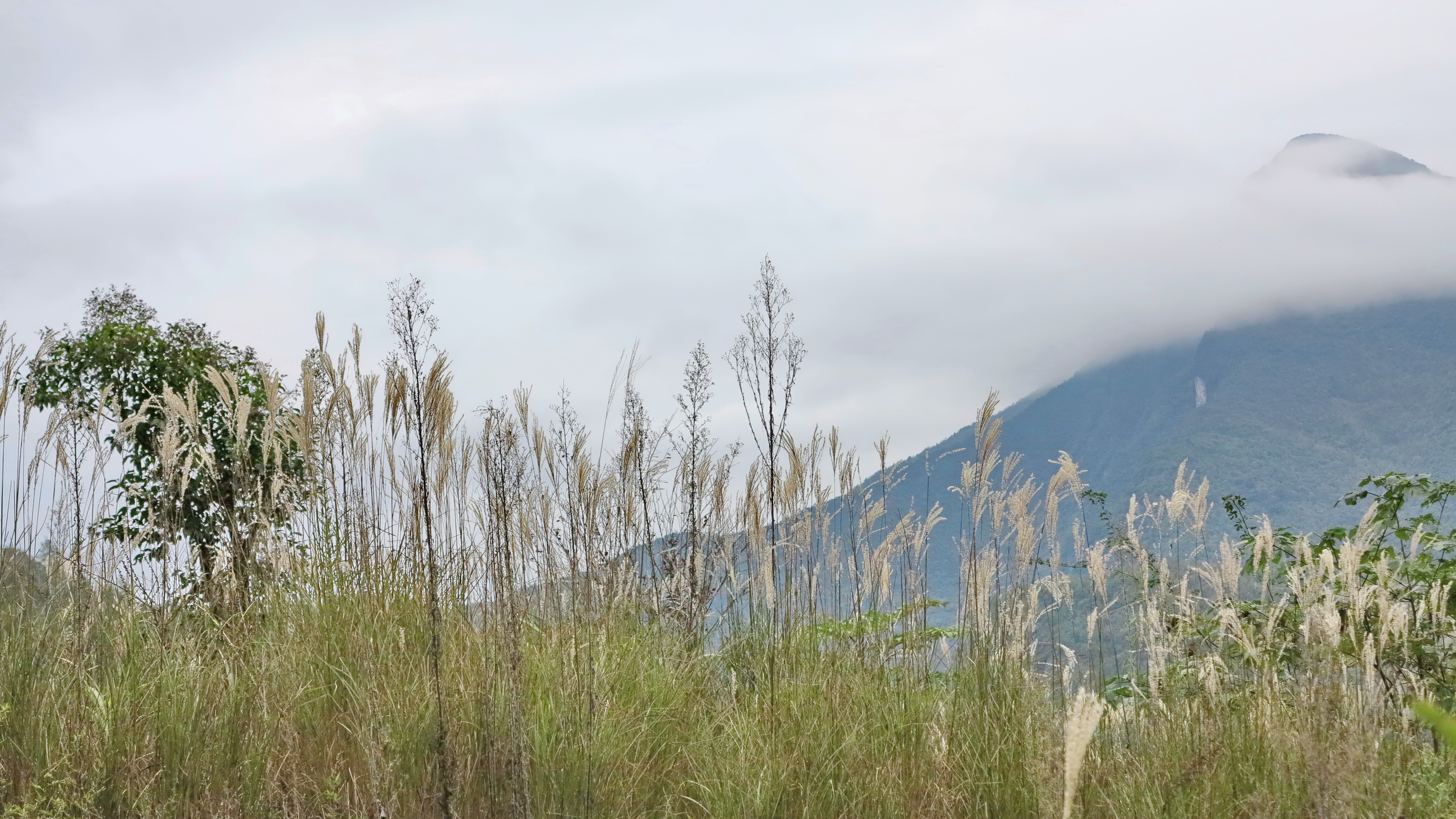
- Yangshuo in Guangxi Wulong in Chongqing Libo in Guizhou Stone Forest in Yunnan Huanjiang in Guangxi Mount Jinfo in Chongqing

- Location within China
- Location: China
- Criteria: Natural: (vii), (viii)
- Reference: 1248bis
- Inscription: 2007 (31st Session)
- Extensions: 2014
- Coordinates: 24°55′24″N 110°21′16″E

The South China Karst (simplified Chinese: 中国南方喀斯特; traditional Chinese: 中國南方喀斯特; pinyin: Zhōngguó Nánfāng Kāsītè), a UNESCO World Heritage Site since June 2007, spans the provinces of Chongqing, Guangxi, Guizhou, and Yunnan. It is noted for its karst features and landscapes as well as rich biodiversity. The site comprises seven clusters Phase I: Libo Karst, Shilin Karst, and Wulong Karst inscribed in 2007, and Phase II: Guilin Karst, Shibing Karst, Jinfoshan Karst, and Huanjiang Karst inscribed in 2014. UNESCO describes the South China Karst as "unrivalled in terms of the diversity of its karst features and landscapes".

The huge karst area of South China is about 550,000 square kilometres (210,000 sq mi) in extent. The karst terrain displays a geomorphic transition as the terrain gradually descends about 2,000 m (6,600 ft) over 700 km (430 mi) from the western Yunnan-Guizhou Plateau (averaging 2,100 m (6,900 ft) elevation) to the eastern Guangxi Basin (averaging 110 m (360 ft) elevation). The region is recognized as the world's type area for karst landform development in the humid tropics and subtropics.

The World Heritage Property of South China Karst is a serial property that includes seven karst clusters in four Provinces: Shilin Karst, Libo Karst, Wulong Karst, Guilin Karst, Shibing Karst, Jinfoshan Karst, and Huanjiang Karst. The total area is 97,125 hectares, with a buffer zone of 176,228 hectares.

The South China Karst World Heritage property protects a diversity of spectacular and iconic continental karst landscapes, including tower karst (fenglin), pinnacle karst (shilin) and cone karst (fengcong), as well as other karst phenomena such as Tiankeng karst (giant dolines), table mountains and gorges. The property also includes many large cave systems with rich speleothem deposits. The karst features and geomorphological diversity of the South China Karst are widely recognized as among the best in the world. The region can be considered the global type-site for three karst landform styles: fenglin (tower karst), fengcong (cone karst), and shilin (stone forest or pinnacle karst).The landscape also retains most of its natural vegetation, which results in seasonal variations and adds to the outstanding aesthetic value of the area.

The property contains a variety of karst landforms and landscapes of South China from interior high plateaus to lowland plains and is an example of humid tropical to subtropical karst.

== South China Karst - UNESCO inscription details ==
UNESCO Inscription No	Name
1248-001	Shilin Karst - Naigu Stone Forest (乃古石林) Shilin Yi Autonomous County
1248-002	Shilin Karst – Suogeyi Village (所各邑村) Shilin Yi Autonomous County
1248-003	Libo Karst – Xiaoqijong (小七孔) Libo County
1248-004	Libo Karst – Dongduo (洞多) Libo County
1248-005	Wulong Karst – Qingkou Giant Doline (Tiankeng) (箐口天坑) Wulong County
1248-006	Wulong Karst – Three Natural Bridges (天生三桥) Wulong County
1248-007	Wulong Karst – Furong Cave (芙蓉洞) Wulong County
1248-008	Guilin Karst – Putao Fenglin Yangshuo County
1248-009	Guilin Karst – Lijiang Fengcong Yangshuo County
1248-010	Shibing Karst Shibing County
1248-011	Jinfoshan Karst Chongqing
1248-012	Huanjiang Karst Huanjiang Maonan Autonomous County

== Gallery ==
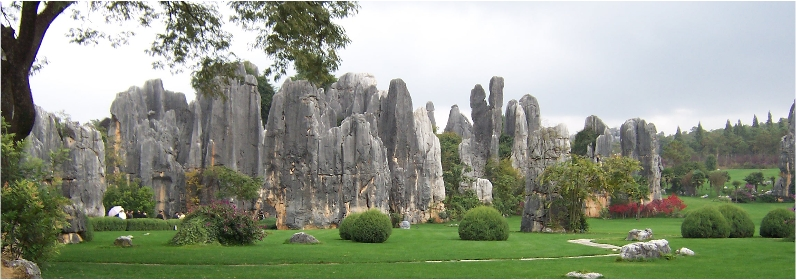
The Shilin (Stone Forest) South China Karst formations scenery

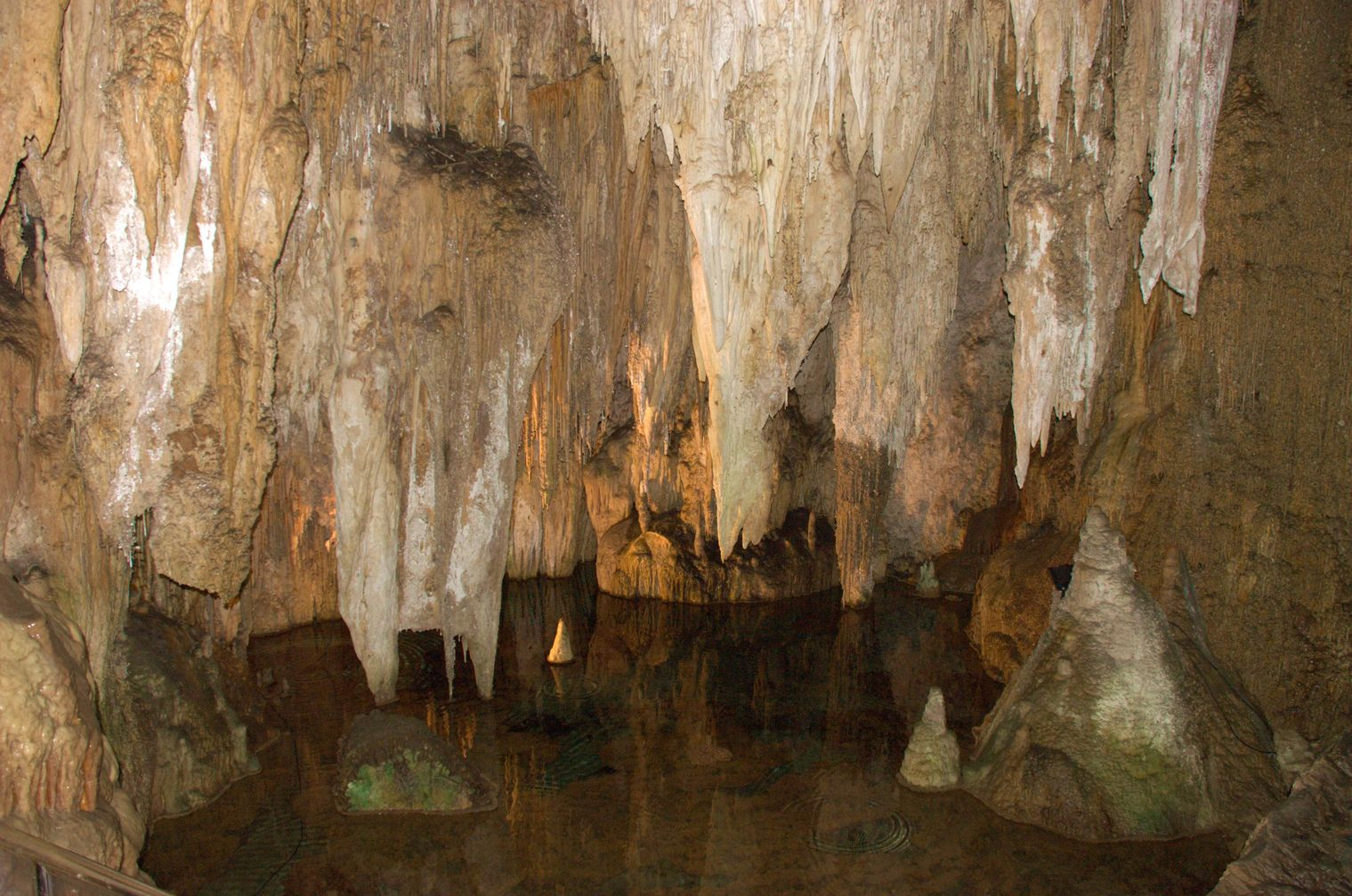
Karst limestone stalactites in the Furong Cave.

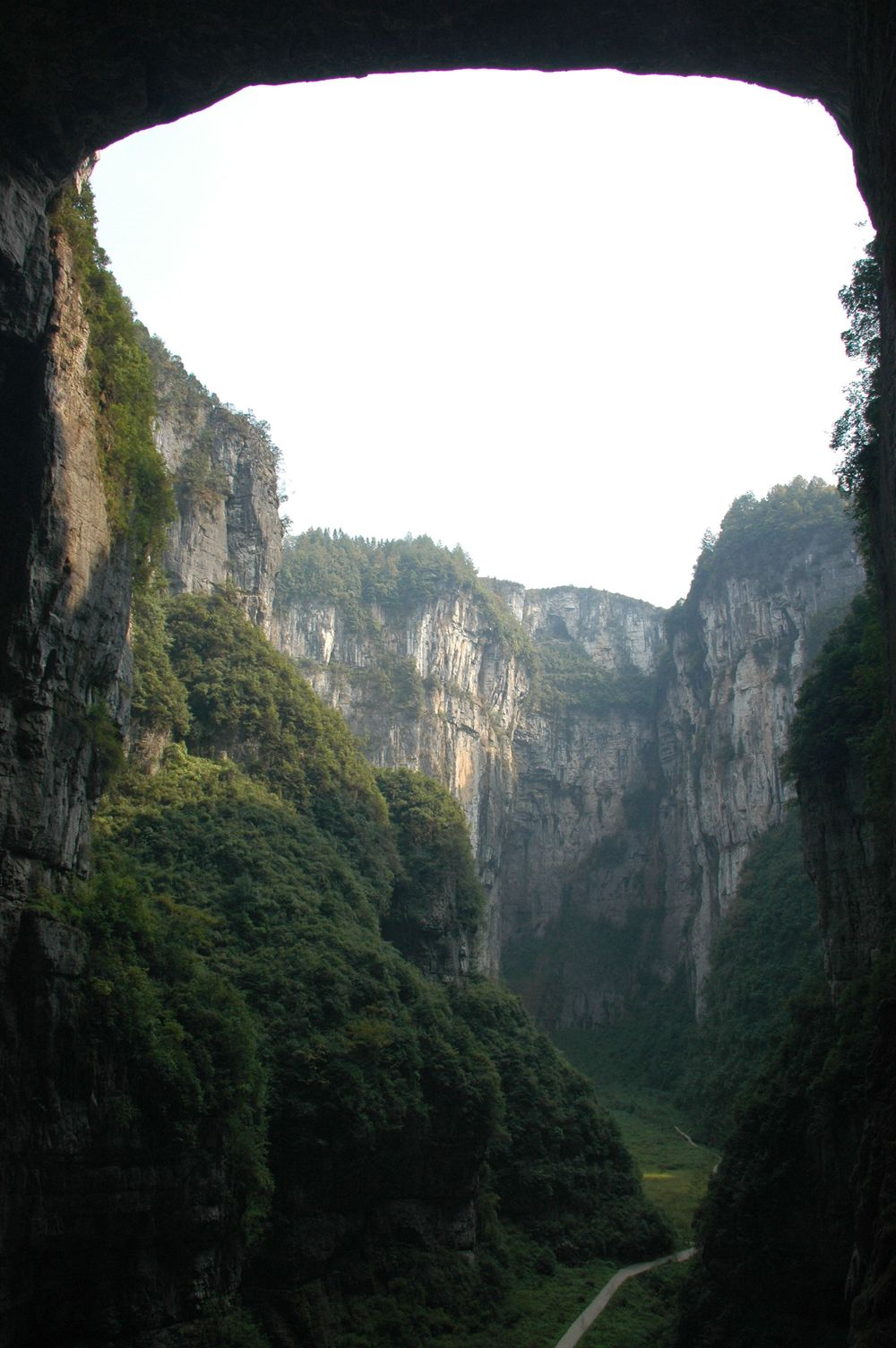
Tianlong Bridge, a South China Karst natural arch.
