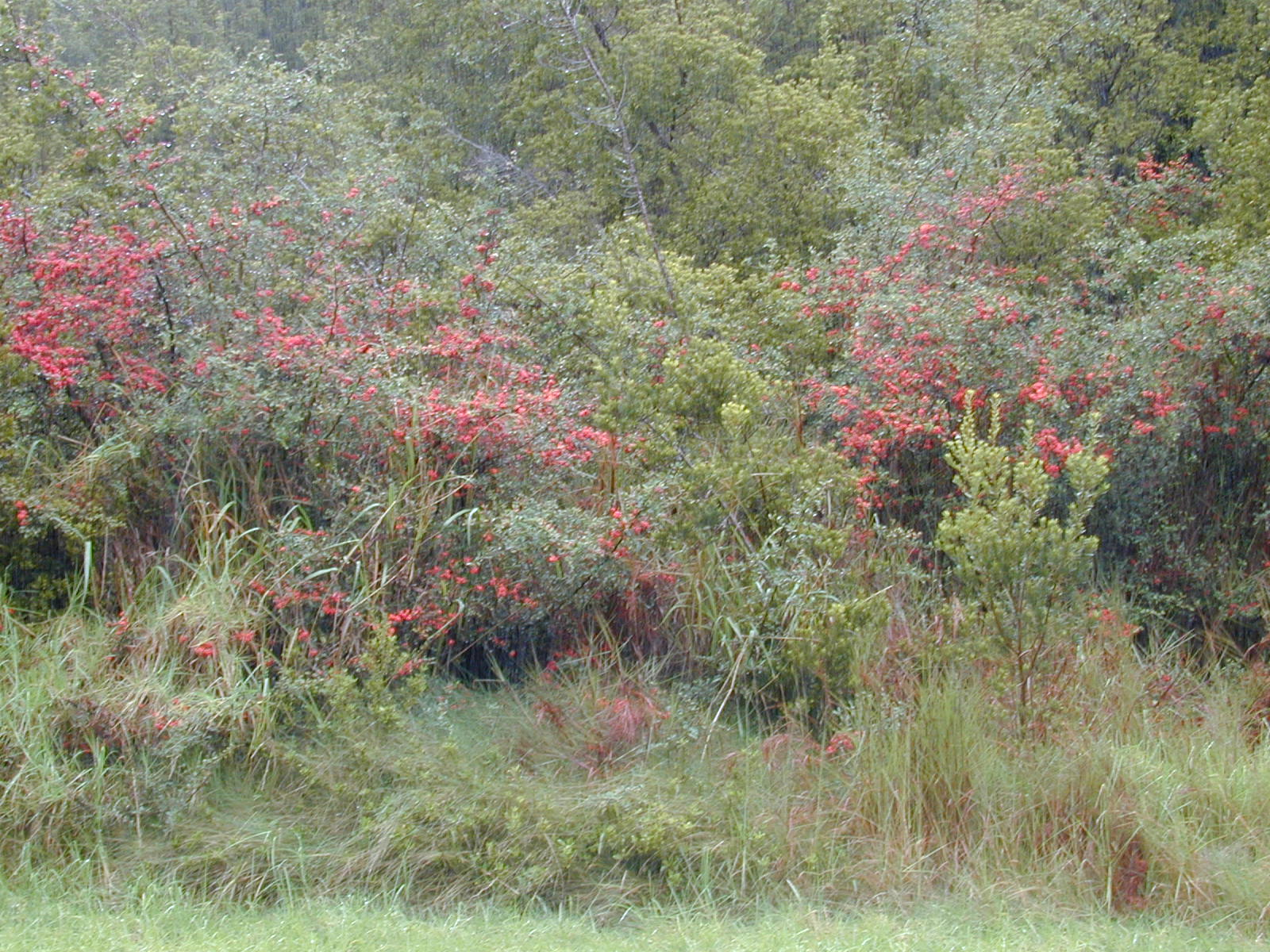

Scientific classification
- Kingdom: Plantae
- Clade: Tracheophytes
- Clade: Angiosperms
- Clade: Eudicots
- Clade: Rosids
- Order: Rosales
- Family: Rosaceae
- Genus: Pyracantha
- Species: P. crenatoserrata

Binomial name
- Pyracantha crenatoserrata (Hance) Rehder

Synonyms
- Photinia crenatoserrata Hance; Pyracantha fortuneana (Maxim.) H. Li (misapplied)

= Pyracantha fortuneana =

Species of flowering plant

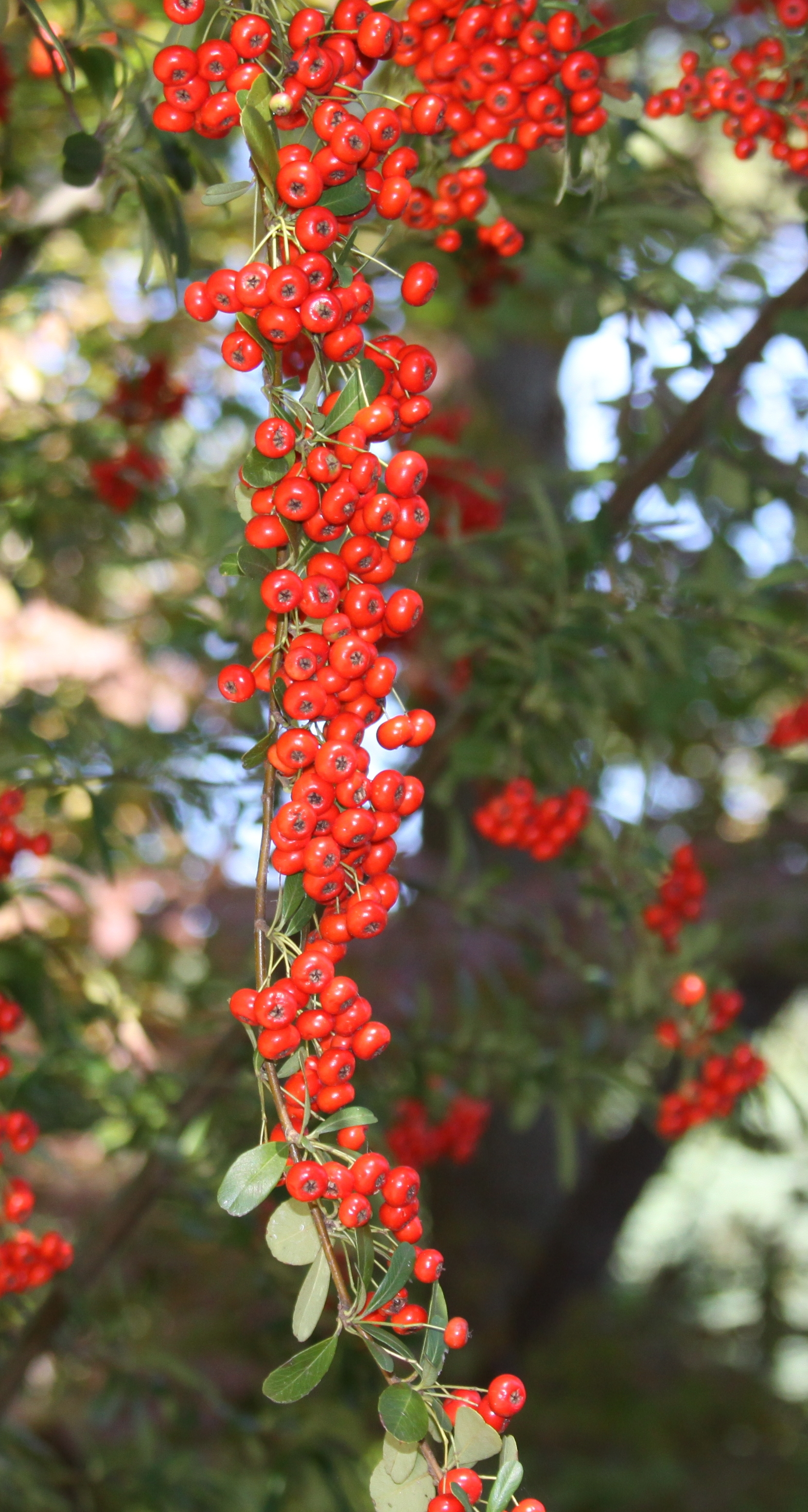
Pyracantha crenatoserrata fruit

Pyracantha crenatoserrata, commonly known as Chinese firethorn or Yunnan firethorn, is a species of firethorn. It is a short shrub. It is cultivated for its decorative bright red pome fruit (inaccurately called berries). The flowers are white. It survives in warm climates. It cannot tolerate frost, but it can withstand drought. This species originates from central China.

It has become naturalised across parts of Australia, New Zealand and the United States.
