= Wulong, Chongqing =

Wulong 武隆区
- District
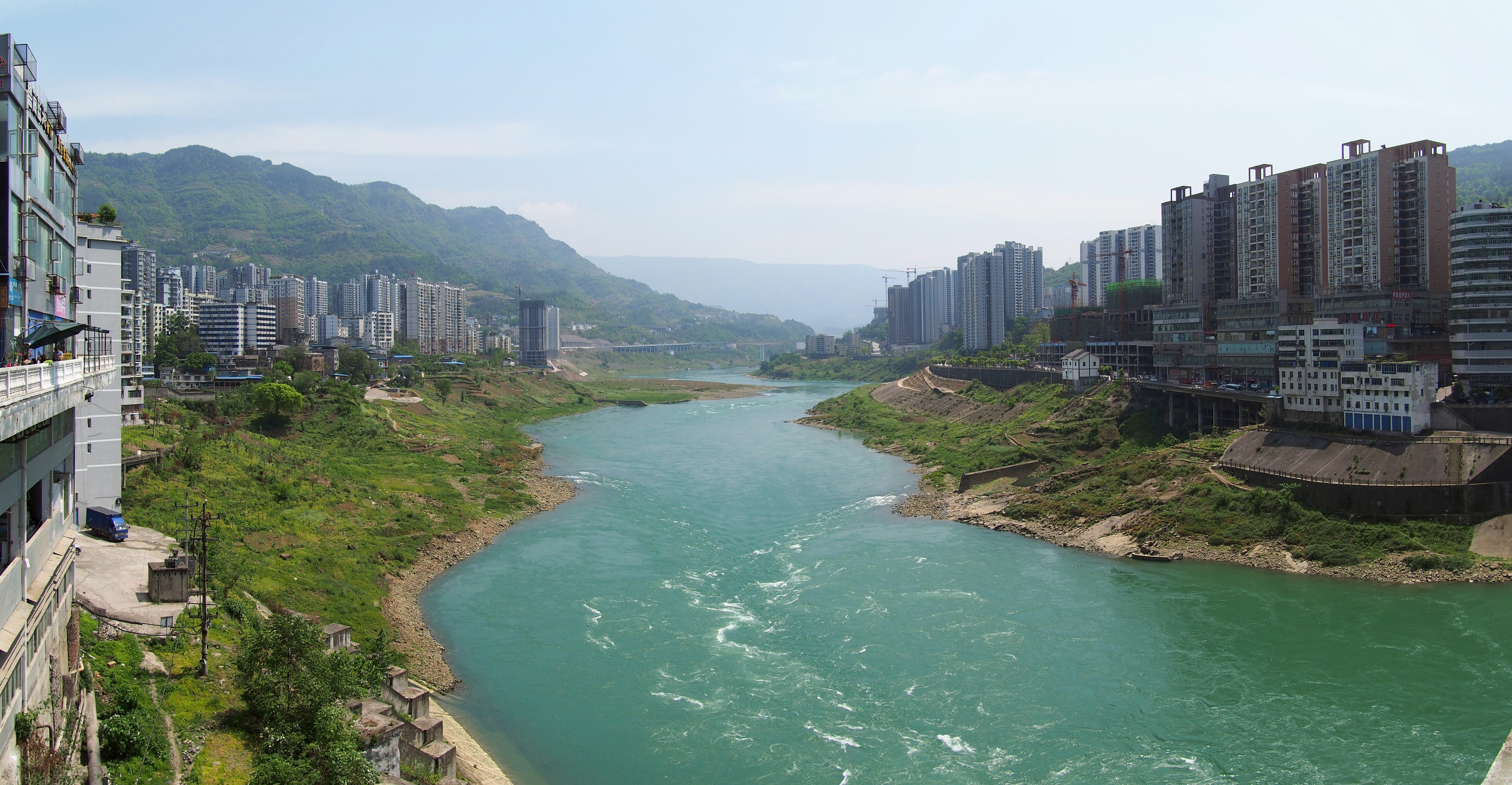

- Location of Wulong in Chongqing
- Country: People's Republic of China
- Municipality: Chongqing

Area
  - Total: 2,872 km^{2} (1,109 sq mi)

Population (2010)
  - Total: 351,000
  - Density: 122/km^{2} (317/sq mi)
- Time zone: UTC+8 (China Standard)

Wulong District (Chinese: 武隆区; pinyin: Wǔlóng Qū) is a district of Chongqing Municipality, China, bordering Guizhou province to the south.

In November 2016, approved by the State Council, Wulong County was replaced by Wulong District in Chongqing. Wulong has placed its main industries on tourism and modern agriculture, and its livelihood and economy have improved considerably compared to a few years ago, making it one of the fastest-growing districts in the southeastern part of Chongqing.

== Administration ==
Name	Chinese (S)	Hanyu Pinyin	Population (2010)	Area (km^{2})
Huolu town	火炉镇	Huǒlú Zhèn	25,818	184.1
Xiangkou town	巷口镇	Xiàngkǒu Zhèn	78,225	163.1
Baima town	白马镇	Báimǎ Zhèn	25,629	139.1
Yajiang town	鸭江镇	Yājiāng Zhèn	19,636	120.7
Changba town	长坝镇	Chángbà Zhèn	15,286	86
Jiangkou town	江口镇	Jiāngkǒu Zhèn	20,829	92.3
Pingqiao town	平桥镇	Píngqiáo Zhèn	14,926	73.4
Yangjiao town	羊角镇	Yángjiǎo Zhèn	14,659	69.9
Xiannüshan town	仙女山镇	Xiānnǚshān Zhèn	13,808	278
Tongzi town	桐梓镇	Tóngzǐ Zhèn	8,896	41.3
Tukan town	土坎镇	Tǔkǎn Zhèn	8,128	41.3
Heshun town	和顺镇	Héshùn Zhèn	11,899	103.2
Shuanghe town	双河镇	Shuānghé Zhèn	9,826	132
Fenglai Township	凤来乡	Fènglái Xiāng	11,036	52.3
Miaoya Township	庙垭乡	Miàoyā Xiāng	8,752	35.9
Shiqiao Township	石桥乡	Shíqiáo Xiāng	8,151	61.7
Huangying Township	黄莺乡	Huángyīng Xiāng	7,955	64
Canggou Township	沧沟乡	Cānggōu Xiāng	8,497	73
Wenfu Township	文复乡	Wénfù Xiāng	6,926	105.5
Tudi Township	土地乡	Tǔdì Xiāng	5,433	75.8
Baiyun Township	白云乡	Báiyún Xiāng	5,457	40.1
Houping Township	后坪乡	Hòupíng Xiāng	4,853	48.5
Haokou Township	浩口乡	Hàokǒu Xiāng	5,475	61
Jielong Township	接龙乡	Jiēlóng Xiāng	4,112	111.4
Zhaojia Township	赵家乡	Zhàojiā Xiāng	3,616	60.2
Dadonghe Township	大洞河乡	Dàdònghé Xiāng	3,210	62.7

== Climate ==
Climate data for Wulong, elevation 278 m (912 ft), (1991–2020 normals, extremes 1981–present)
Month	Jan	Feb	Mar	Apr	May	Jun	Jul	Aug	Sep	Oct	Nov	Dec	Year
Record high °C (°F)	23.1 (73.6)	30.0 (86.0)	34.4 (93.9)	36.8 (98.2)	37.0 (98.6)	39.8 (103.6)	40.8 (105.4)	42.7 (108.9)	41.1 (106.0)	35.7 (96.3)	28.3 (82.9)	20.2 (68.4)	42.7 (108.9)
Mean daily maximum °C (°F)	10.5 (50.9)	13.0 (55.4)	18.0 (64.4)	23.4 (74.1)	26.9 (80.4)	29.6 (85.3)	33.4 (92.1)	33.4 (92.1)	28.8 (83.8)	22.5 (72.5)	17.5 (63.5)	11.9 (53.4)	22.4 (72.3)
Daily mean °C (°F)	7.2 (45.0)	9.4 (48.9)	13.2 (55.8)	17.8 (64.0)	21.4 (70.5)	24.4 (75.9)	27.5 (81.5)	27.1 (80.8)	23.4 (74.1)	18.3 (64.9)	13.8 (56.8)	8.7 (47.7)	17.7 (63.8)
Mean daily minimum °C (°F)	5.0 (41.0)	7.0 (44.6)	10.0 (50.0)	14.3 (57.7)	17.8 (64.0)	21.1 (70.0)	23.6 (74.5)	23.1 (73.6)	20.0 (68.0)	15.8 (60.4)	11.5 (52.7)	6.6 (43.9)	14.7 (58.4)
Record low °C (°F)	−1.8 (28.8)	−0.8 (30.6)	1.4 (34.5)	6.3 (43.3)	11.4 (52.5)	14.6 (58.3)	18.3 (64.9)	18.0 (64.4)	11.7 (53.1)	6.5 (43.7)	0.9 (33.6)	−1.5 (29.3)	−1.8 (28.8)
Average precipitation mm (inches)	15.8 (0.62)	23.7 (0.93)	46.7 (1.84)	99.7 (3.93)	144.5 (5.69)	161.8 (6.37)	150.5 (5.93)	127.6 (5.02)	98.8 (3.89)	89.8 (3.54)	48.5 (1.91)	16.3 (0.64)	1,023.7 (40.31)
Average precipitation days (≥ 0.1 mm)	9.6	9.1	11.8	15.0	16.9	16.0	13.7	13.0	11.5	15.3	12.0	9.7	153.6
Average snowy days	0.7	0.2	0	0	0	0	0	0	0	0	0	0.2	1.1
Average relative humidity (%)	79	77	76	79	81	82	78	77	80	85	85	82	80
Mean monthly sunshine hours	34.4	32.7	71.9	97.6	112.5	108.4	177.6	183.2	116.3	68.4	51.2	36.8	1,091
Percentage possible sunshine	11	10	19	25	27	26	42	45	32	20	16	12	24
Source: China Meteorological Administration

== Education ==
Wulong Middle School was founded in 1942 and became a key middle school in Chongqing in 2005. There is a central elementary school in Baiyun Town.

== Transportation ==
The district is served by Chongqing Xiannüshan Airport which opened in December 2020.

== World Heritage Site ==
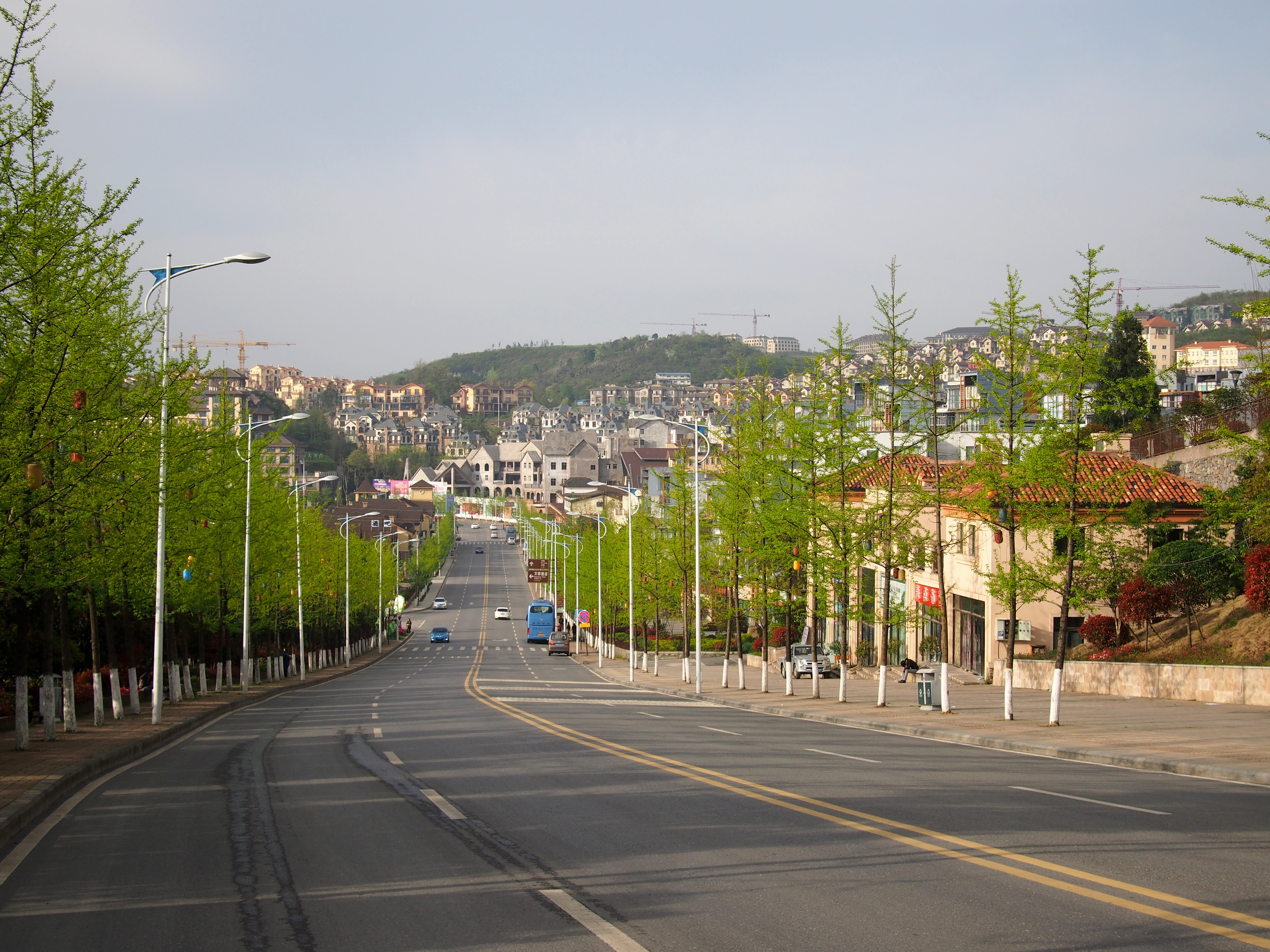
Xiannüshan Town

Numerous Wulong Karst limestone rock formations are scenic landmarks in Wulong. They are protected within the UNESCO South China Karst World Heritage Site.

=== Features ===
- Three Natural Bridges — in Xiannüshan Town.
- Furong Cave —on the Furong River.
- Er Wang Dong — in Houping Miao and Tuzi Ethnic Township.
