= Wulong Karst =

Karst landscape in China

Coordinates: 29.3°N 108.0°E

The Wulong Karst (Chinese: 武隆喀斯特) is a karst landscape located within the borders of Wulong District, Chongqing Municipality, People's Republic of China. It is divided into three areas containing the Three Natural Bridges, the Qingkou Tiankeng (箐口天坑) and Furong Cave respectively. It is a part of the Wulong Karst National Geology Park as well as part of the South China Karst, a UNESCO World Heritage Site.

== Scenic areas ==
=== Three Natural Bridges ===
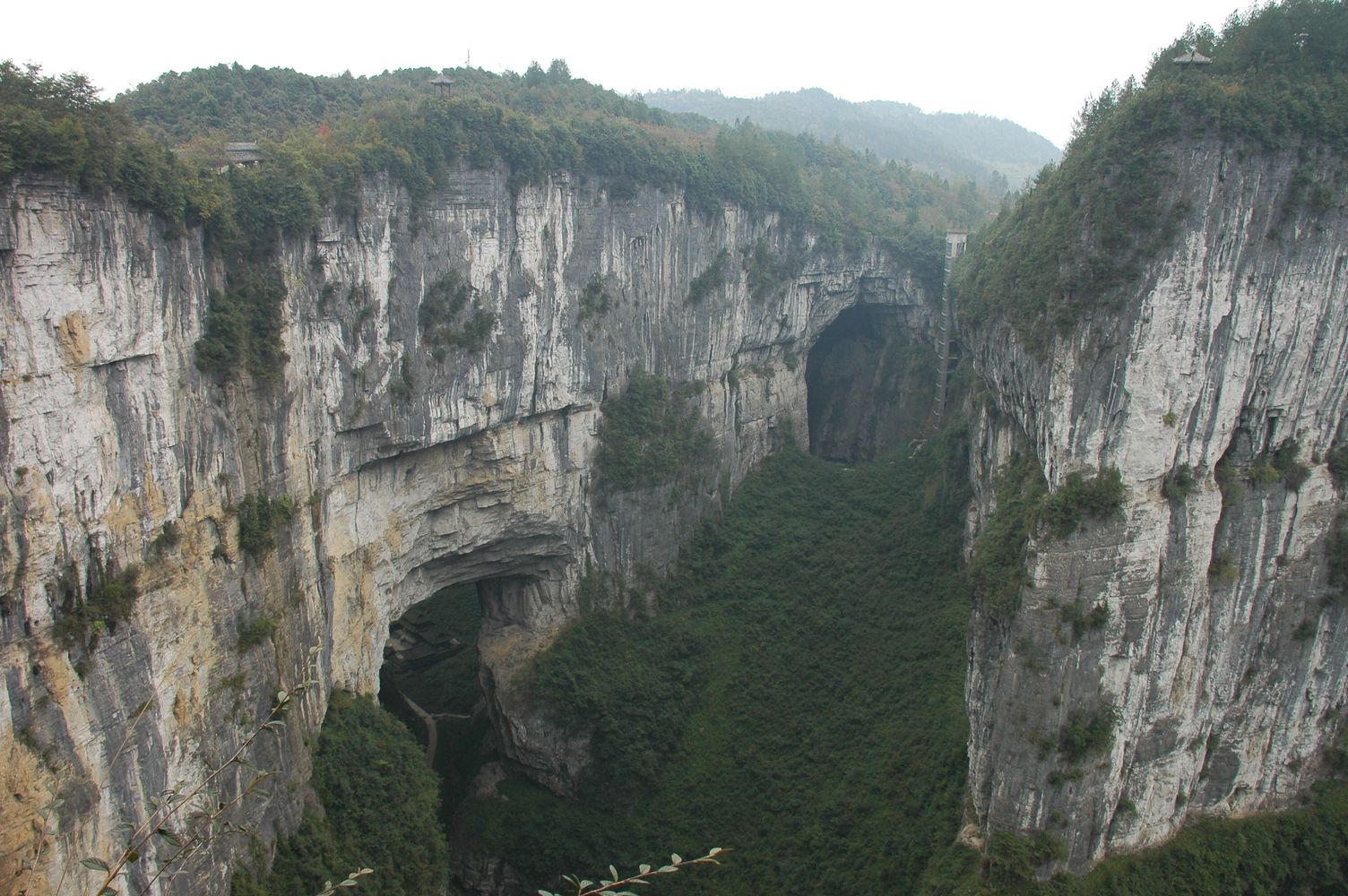
The Three Natural Bridges

The Three Natural Bridges (simplified Chinese: 天生三桥; traditional Chinese: 天生三橋; pinyin: Tiānshēng Sān Qiáo), a series of natural limestone bridges located in Xiannushan Town (仙女山镇), Wulong County, are the nucleus of a 22 km^{2} (8.5 sq mi) conservation area which includes the following features:

- Tianlong (天龙桥) Qinglong (青龙桥) and Heilong (黑龙桥) limestone bridges;
- Qinglong Tiankeng (青龙天坑);
- Shenying Tiankeng (神鹰天坑);
- Yangshui River Karst Canyon (羊水河喀斯特峡谷);
- Longshui Gorge (龙水峡地缝);
- Central Shiyuan Tiankeng (中石院天坑);
- Lower Shiyuan Tiankeng (下石院天坑);
- Seventy-two Branch Cave (七十二岔洞);
- Longquan Cave (龙泉洞);
- Immortal Cave (仙人洞);
- Hidden Monkey Stream (猴子坨伏流);
- Hidden Baiguo Stream (白果伏流).

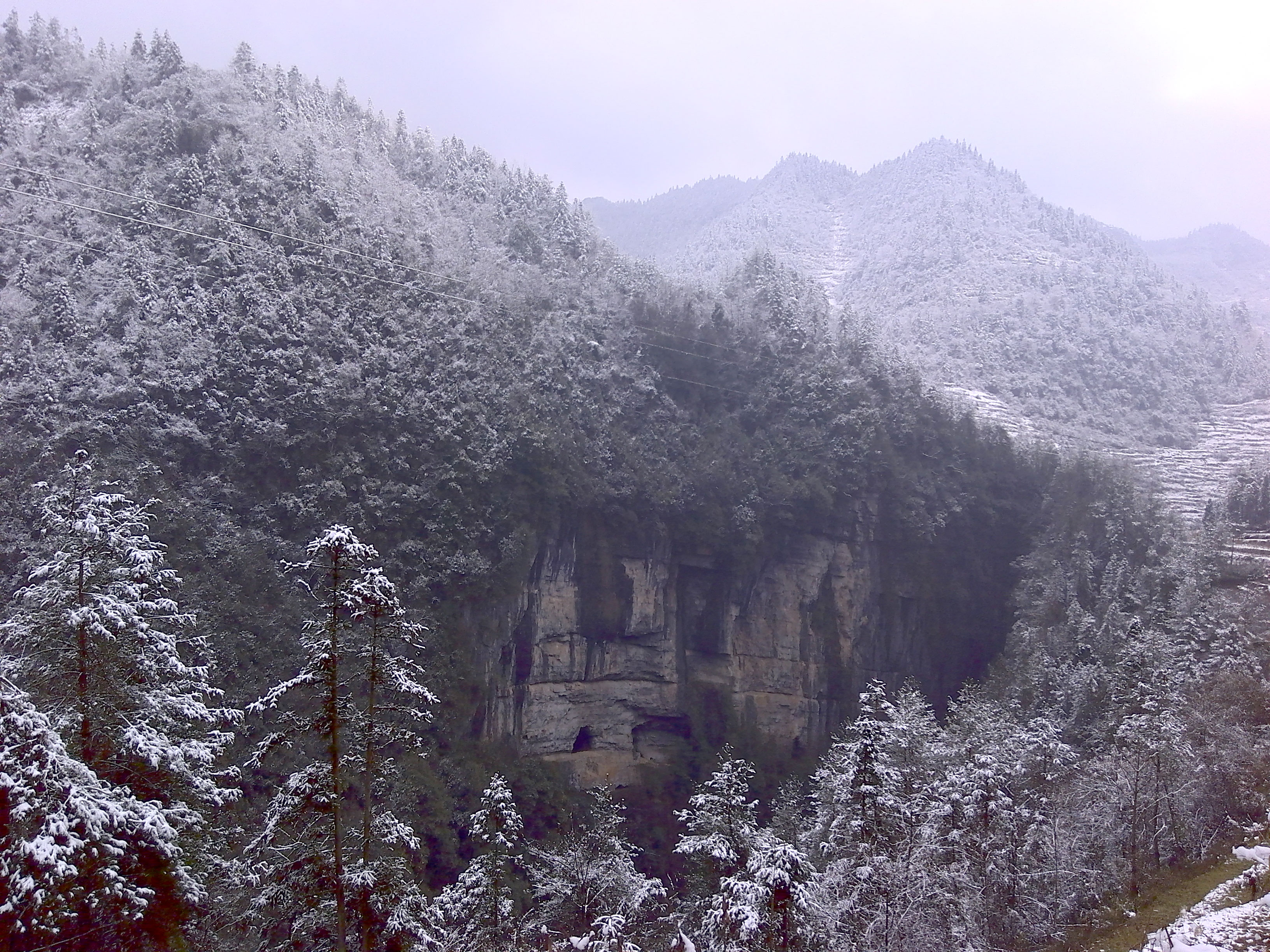
Niubizidong Tiankeng.

=== Qingkou Tiankeng Scenic Area ===
The Qingkou Tiankeng Scenic Area (simplified Chinese: 箐口天坑景区; traditional Chinese: 箐口天坑景區) is located around Houping Township (后坪乡), Wulong District and includes 5 tiankengs:

- Qingkou Tiankeng (箐口天坑);
- Niubizidong Tiankeng (牛鼻子洞天坑)
- Daluodang Tiankeng (打锣凼天坑)
- Tianpingmiao Tiankeng (天平庙天坑)
- Shiwangdong Tiankeng (石王洞天坑)

and nearby caves. This is the only currently known tiankeng cluster in the world hypothesized to have formed by surface water erosion.

The Qingkou Tiankeng Scenic Area (sometimes known as the Houping mechanical-erosion karst tiankeng system) comprises a 7,134 ha core zone and 46,781 ha buffer zone for a total of 53,915 ha of protected area.

=== Furong Cave-Furong Jiang Scenic Area ===
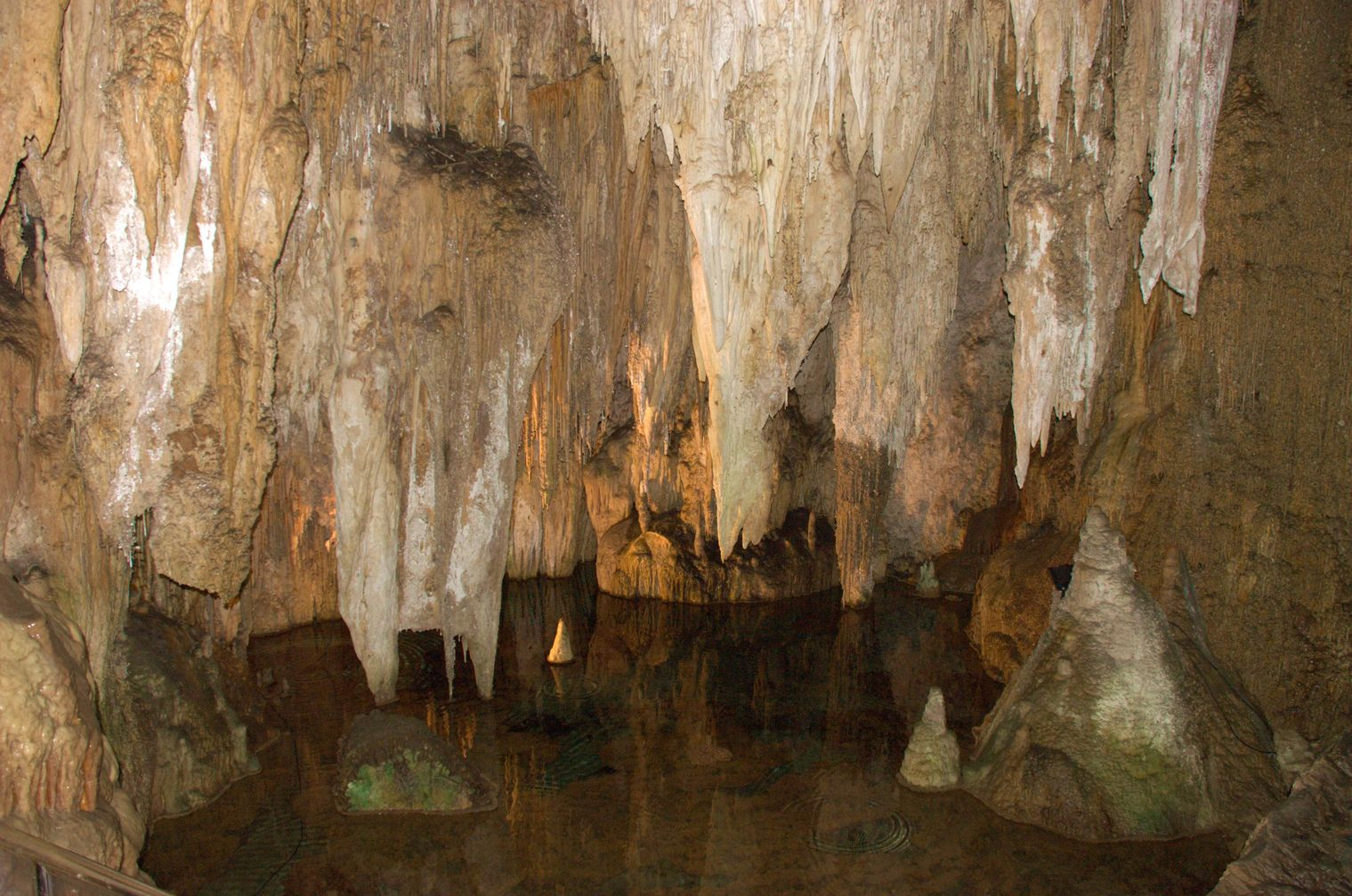
Stalactites in the Furong Cave

Furong Cave (Chinese: 芙蓉洞) is located in Jiangkou Town (江口镇), Wulong District, some 20 km (12 mi) from the district center, near the confluence of the Furong and Wu rivers. The cave is 2,846 m (9,337 ft) long and features numerous vertical shafts running through the limestone. Stalactites and other sedimentary features abound throughout the cave, and it is open daily for tours.

The Furong Cave-Furong Jiang area comprises a 3,941 ha core zone and 24,024 ha buffer zone, for 27,965 ha total protected area.

== Flora ==
The Wulong Karst area has the following types of forests and plant communities.

- Subtropical needle-leaved forest: Pinus massoniana, Cupressus funebris; mixed Pinus massoniana, and Cupressus funebris
- Evergreen broad-leaved forest: species Pinus massoniana; families Cupressaceae, Taxodiaceae, Lauraceae, Theaceae, Elaeocarpaceae; and genera Castanopsis, and Quercus
- Deciduous broad-leaved forest: Quercus fabrei, Quercus acutissima, and Kalopanax ricinifolium
- Shrublands: Pyracantha fortuneana, Vitex negundo, and Distylium racemosum shrubs
- Deciduous trees and shrubs: Quercus, Liquidambar formosana, Pyracantha fortuneana, Vitex negundo, and Ulmaceae
- Bamboo forests: Phyllostachys heteroclada and Sinoca lamusaffinis

Protected plants include Ginkgo biloba, Eucommia ulmoides, Taxus chinensis, Handeliodendron bodinieri, Liriodendron chinense, Juglans regia, Phellodendron chinense, Fagopyrum dibotrys, Cinnamomum camphora, Camptotheca acuminata, Actinidia chinensis, and Gynostemma pentaphyllum.

== See also ==
- South China Karst
