= List of caves in China =

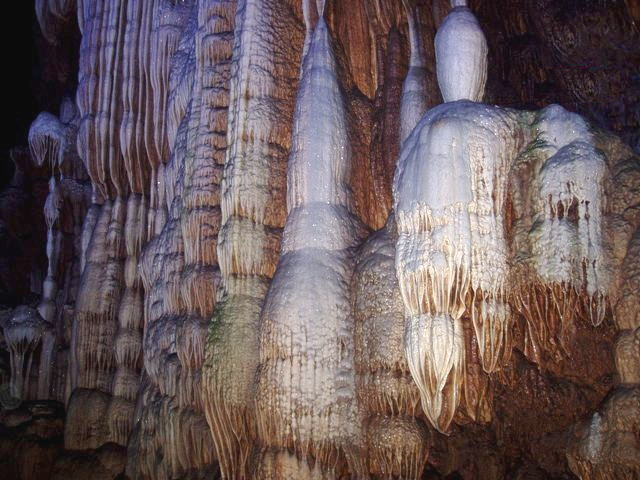
Calcite accretion at Seven Stars Cave.

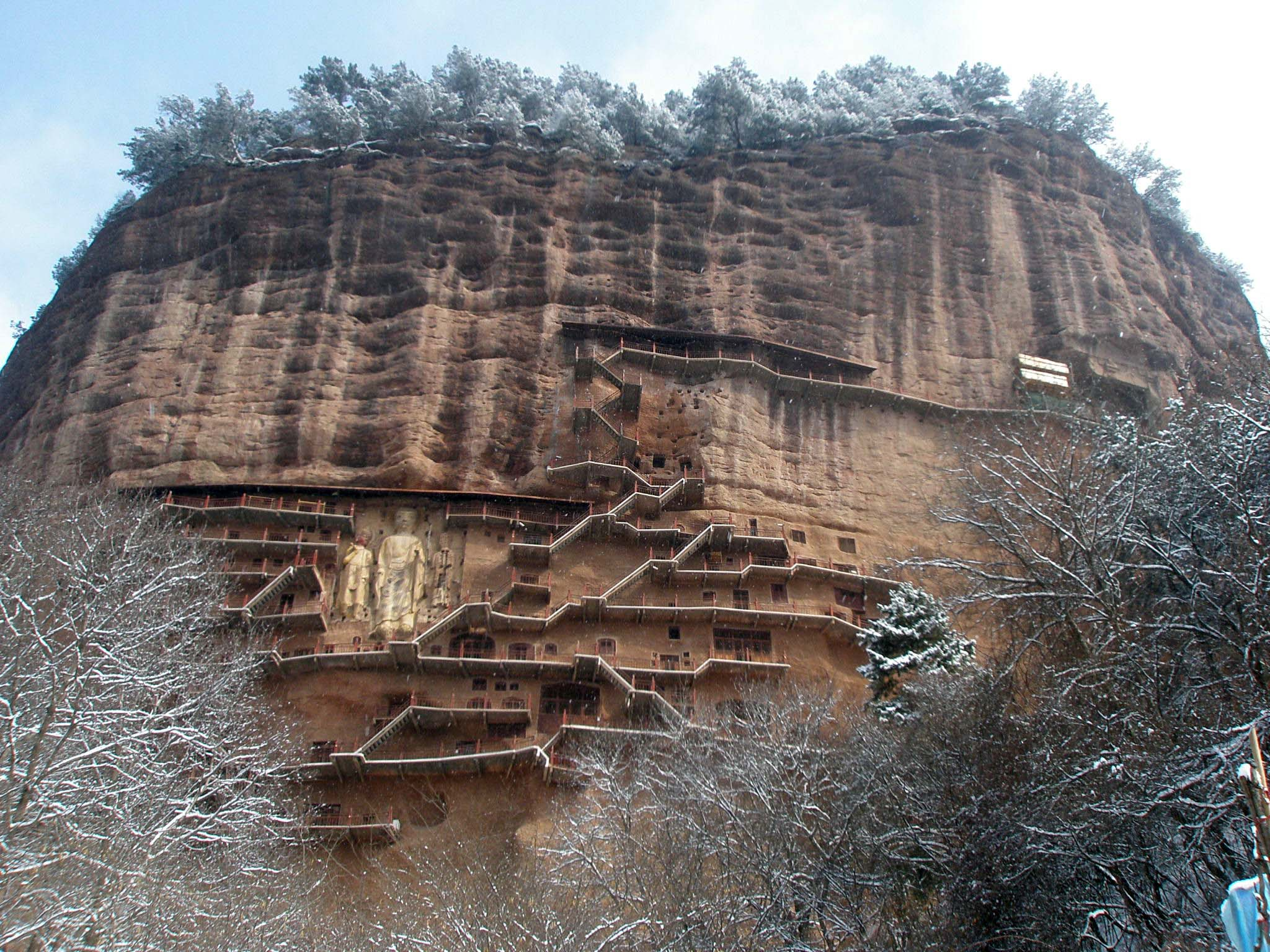
Majishan Grottoes

China is notable for its natural and man-made caves

This is an incomplete list of caves in China. It includes natural caves and rock cut grottoes.

== Natural caves ==
Name	Depth (m)	Length (m)	Geology	Remarks
Benxi Water Caves				Liaoning Province
Binghu Cave		120 m (390 ft)	karst	Zhejiang Province
Crown Cave				Guilin Prefecture-level city
Furong Cave		2,846 m (9,337 ft)	karst	Chongqing Municipality
Fu Yuan Dong	1,000 m (3,300 ft)			near Daluo village, Guangxi province
Hongqingsi Grottoes				Yima, Henan
Huanglong Cave		15 m (49 ft)	karst	Hunan Province
Jiangzhou Cave System	150 m (490 ft)	53,070 m (174,110 ft)		Guangxi Province
Kizil Caves				Xinjiang Province
Longgu Cave		120 m (390 ft)		Hubei Province
Luobi Cave			karst	Hainan Province
Macaque Cave			karst	Hainan Province
Reed Flute Cave				Guangxi Province
Seven-star Cave			karst	Guangxi Province
Shanjuan Cave				Jiangsu Province
Shuanglong Cave		33 m (108 ft)	karst	Zhejiang Province
Shuanghedong	912 m (2,992 ft)	400.7 km (1,315,000 ft)	gypsum and dolomite	Guizhou Province
Tenglong Cave		52,800 m (173,200 ft)	karst	Hubei Province
Taiji Cave		54,000 m (177,000 ft)	karst	Anhui Province
Tianyuan Cave				Beijing Municipality
Xianren Cave	14 metres (46 ft)			Jiangxi Province
Xueyu Cave		1,644 m (5,394 ft)	karst	Chongqing Municipality
Yiyuan Rong Cave Group			karst	Zibo, Shandong Province
Yilong Cave		4,200 m (13,800 ft)	karst	Jiangxi Province
Zhijin Cave		13,500 m (44,300 ft)	karst	Guizhou Province
Zhoukoudian			karst	Beijing Municipality. Site of the discovery of Peking Man, (Wade–Giles: Choukoutien).

== Buddhist grottoes ==
Name	Depth	Length	Geology	Remarks
Bhaisajyaraja				
Bezeklik Thousand Buddha Caves				
Bingling Temple				
Binyang Middle				
Binyang North				
Binyang South				
Dazu Rock Carvings				
Hidden Stream Temple Cave				
Kizil Caves				
Kumtura Thousand Buddha Caves				
Lingyin Temple				
Longmen Grottoes				
Maijishan Grottoes				Located in Gansu Province.
Mogao Caves				Located in Gansu Province.
Tuoshan				
Western Thousand Buddha Caves				Located in Gansu Province.
Yulin Caves				Located in Gansu Province.
Yungang Grottoes				

== See also ==
- List of caves
- Speleology
