= Shuanghedong Cave Network =

Cave network in china

Shuanghedong
- 双河洞
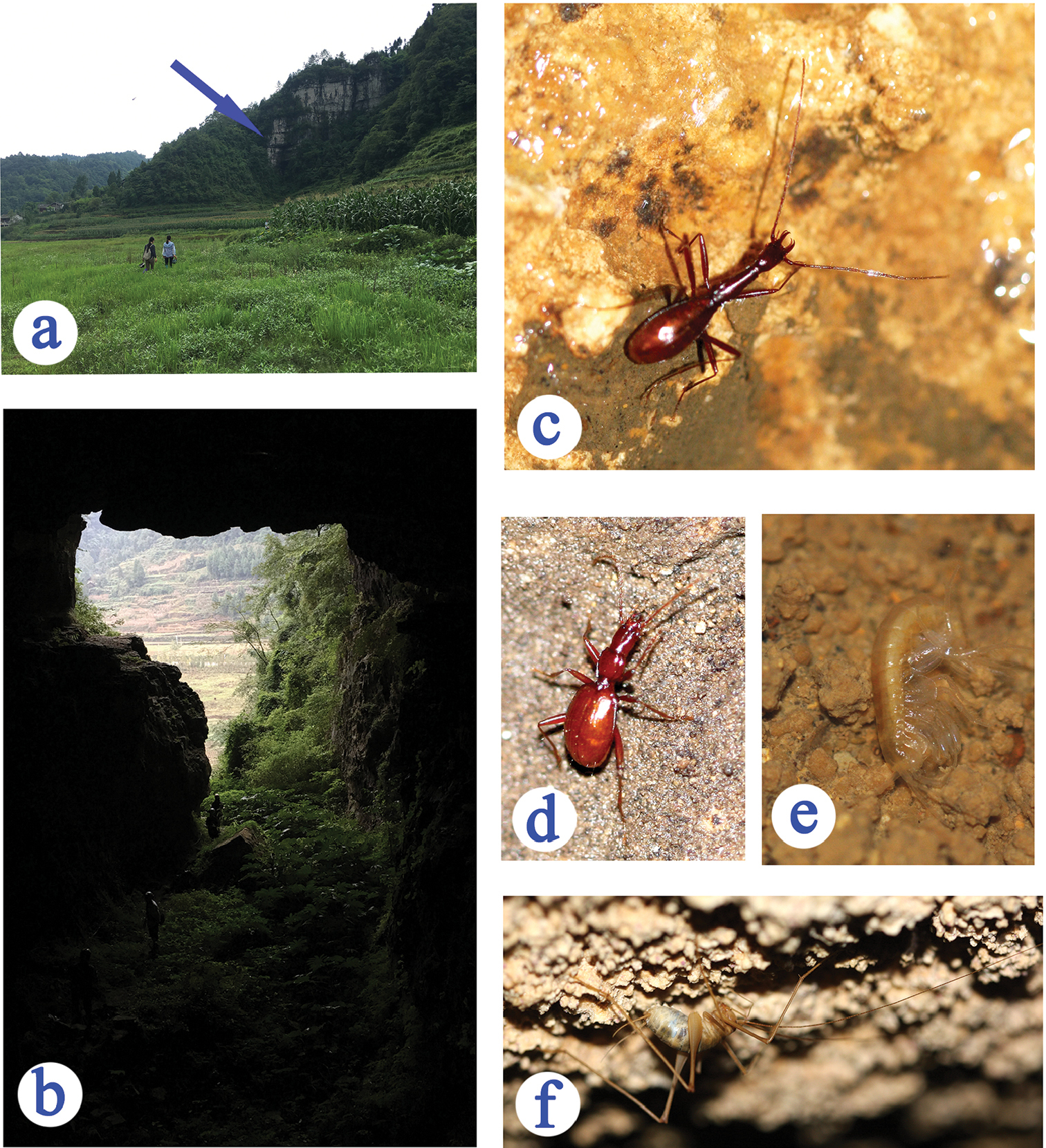
- Part of the cave and various species that live within it

- Location within China
- Location: Suiyang County, Guizhou, China
- Coordinates: 28.24199°N 107.27608°E
- Depth: 912 metres (2,992 ft)
- Length: 437.4 kilometres (271.8 mi)
- Geology: Dolomite
- Entrances: 115

Shuanghedong (Chinese: 双河洞; pinyin: Shuānghédòng; lit. 'twin rivers cave') is the longest cave in China and in Asia, the largest dolomite cave system in the world, and the third longest cave in the world as of May 2023. Its current explored length is 437.4 kilometres (271.8 mi).

The cave network is located in Suiyang Shuanghe Cave National Geopark, near the town of Wenquan in Suiyang County, Zunyi, Guizhou Province. It is situated within the Furong River basin, a primary tributary of the Wu River.

The cave is a UNESCO World Heritage Site.

== Ecology ==
The cave contains numerous waterfalls and at least three underground rivers, some of which contain cave shrimp and fish weighing several pounds. Tadpoles, frogs, giant salamanders, insects, spiders, crabs, bats, leeches, blind fish, and mushrooms have also been found.

Many fossils from the Quaternary period have been discovered in the cave, including mammalian species such as giant pandas, serows, Sumatran rhinoceroses, and stegodons. Nearly 50 individual giant panda fossils ranging from 100,000 years to merely centuries old have been identified, with over 20 skeletons intact.

== Exploration ==
Since exploration began in 1987, at least 20 expeditions from China, France, Japan, Portugal, Belgium, and other countries have explored the cave, including researchers from the Guizhou Institute of Mountain Resources and the Guizhou Cave Association.

In May 2023 the network reached 400 kilometres (250 mi) of development. As of 2024, there are 115 known entrances to the cave network. The average annual temperature inside the cave is 13 °C (55 °F), and its maximum explored depth is 912 metres (2,992 ft).

== See also ==
- Jiangzhou Cave System
- Speleology
- Taiji Cave
- Tenglong Cave
- Yiyuan Rong Cave Group
- Zhijin Cave
- Zhoukoudian Peking Man Site
- List of caves
  - List of caves in China
- List of longest caves
