= Grotto-heavens =

Taoist sacred natural sites

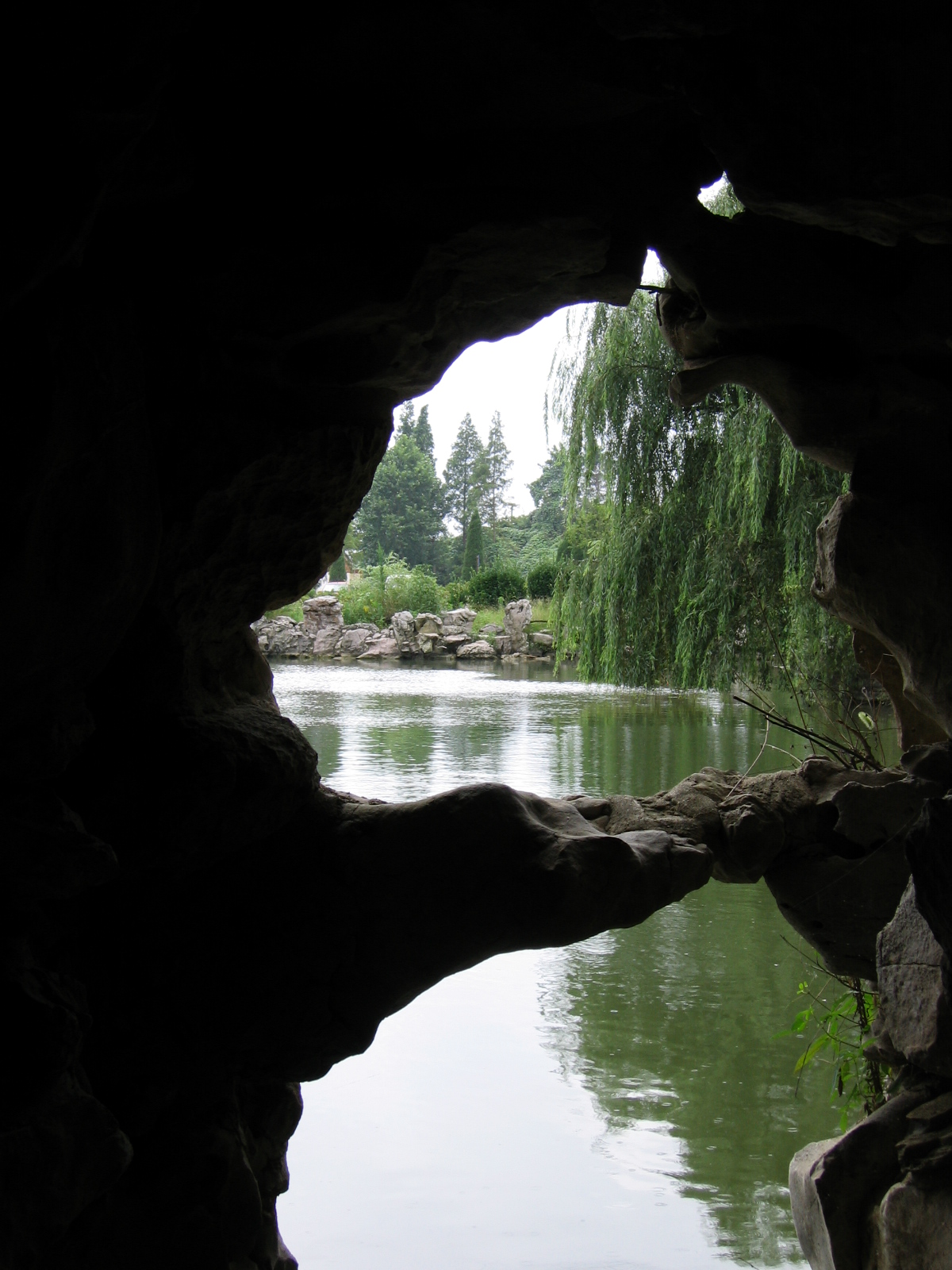
View from inside Taiji Cave grotto-heaven (simplified Chinese: 太极洞; traditional Chinese: 太極洞; pinyin: Tàijí Dòng; lit. 'Cave of the Supreme Ultimate') is a karst cave located on Shilong Mountain (石龙山), in Guangde County, Xuancheng City, Anhui Province, People's Republic of China.

Grotto-heavens (Chinese: 洞天; pinyin: Dòngtiān) or Dongtian are a type of sacred Taoist site. Grotto-heavens are usually caves, grottoes, mountain hollows, or other underground spaces. Grotto-heavens are believed to be dwellings of xian (immortals).

Grotto-heavens were first organized systematically in Tang times by Sima Chengzhen (司马承祯) (647–735, see Zuowanglun) and Du Guangting (杜光庭) (850–933). The most sacred of these sites were divided into two types: the ten greater grotto-heavens and the thirty-six lesser grotto-heavens.

== Etymology ==
Dongtian consists of two Chinese characters, dong (洞) and tian (天, "heaven").

The original meaning of the character dong is swiftly flowing water. Around 200, dong acquired the meaning of cave. After that, the meanings "penetrating" and "communicating" emerged.

== History ==
The concept of grotto-heavens emerged no later than the 4th century. According to Verellen, Shangqing revelations at Maoshan (364–370) was one most developing period or even the origin of the concept. The earliest known texts about grotto-heavens include Maojun zhuan (Life of Lord Mao), written in the 360s, and Zhen'gao (Declarations of the Perfected), compiled in 499.

In the Tang dynasty, the concept of grotto-heavens was systematized. Sima Chengzhen (司马承祯) compiled Tiandi gongfu tu (天地宫府图 Diagram of Palaces and Departments in Heaven and Earth) possibly in the early 8th century. Tiandi gongfu tu is the earliest known text that includes ten greater and thirty-six lesser grotto-heavens and seventy-two blessed lands.

Du Guangting (杜光庭) finished compiling Dongtian fudi yuedu mingshan ji (洞天福地岳渎名山记) in 901. Du integrated different Taoist theories of sacred sites into one synthesis. He listed 221 sacred sites, and arranged them from the heavenly realms to terrestrial land, in hierarchical order. This hierarchical order was the most authoritative version about grotto-heavens until the end of imperial China.

== Locations ==
Ten greater grotto-heavens are in:

- Mt. Wangwu grotto 王屋山 (Henan)
- Mt. Weiyu grotto 委羽山 (Zhejiang)
- Mt. Xicheng grotto 西城山 (Shaanxi)
- Mt. Xixuan grotto 西玄山 (on Huashan, Shaanxi)
- Mt. Qingcheng grotto 青城山 (Sichuan)
- Mt. Chicheng grotto 赤城山 (Zhejiang)
- Mt. Luofu grotto 羅浮山 (Guangdong)
- Mt. Gouqu grotto 句曲山 (Jiangsu)
- Mt. Linwu grotto 林屋山 (in Lake Tai, Jiangsu)
- Mt. Kuocang grotto 括蒼山 (Zhejiang)

Thirty-six lesser grotto-heavens are in:

- Mt. Huotong grotto 霍童山 (Fujian)
- Mt. Tai grotto 泰山 (Shandong)
- Mt. Heng grotto 衡山 (Hunan)
- Mt. Hua grotto 华山 (Shaanxi)
- Mt. Chang grotto 常山 (Shanxi)
- Mt. Song grotto 嵩山 (Henan)
- Mt. Emei grotto 峨嵋山 (Sichuan)
- Mt. Lu grotto 庐山 (Jiangxi)
- Mt. Siming grotto 四明山 (Zhejiang)
- Mt. Guiji grotto 会稽山 (Zhejiang)
- Mt. Taibo grotto 太白山 (Shaanxi)
- Mt. Xi grotto 西山 (Jiangxi)
- Mt. Dawei grotto 大围山 (Hunan)
- Mt. Qian grotto 灊山 (Anhui)
- Mt. Wuyi grotto 武夷山 (Fujian)
- Mt. Guigu grotto 鬼谷山 (Jiangxi)
- Mt. Huagai grotto 华盖山 (Zhejiang)
- Mt. Yusi grotto 玉笥山 (Jiangxi)
- Mt. Gaizhu grotto 盖竹山 (Zhejiang)
- Mt. Duqiao grotto 都峤山 (Guangxi)
- Mt. Boshi grotto 白石山 (Guangxi)
- Mt. Julou grotto 句漏山 (Guangxi)
- Mt. Jiuyi grotto 九疑山 (Hunan)
- Mt. Dongyang grotto 洞阳山 (Hunan)
- Mt. Mufu grotto 幕阜山 (Hunan)
- Mt. Dayou grotto 大酉山 (Hunan)
- Mt. Jinting grotto 金庭山 (Zhejiang)
- Mt. Magu grotto 麻姑山 (Jiangxi)
- Mt. Xiandu grotto 仙都山 (Zhejiang)
- Mt. Qingtian grotto 青田山 (Zhejiang)
- Mt. Tianzhu grotto 天柱山 (Zhejiang)
- Mt. Zhong grotto 钟山 (Jiangsu)
- Mt. Liangchang grotto 良常山 (Jiangsu)
- Mt. Taoyuan grotto 桃源山 (Hunan)
- Mt. Jinhua grotto 金华山 (Zhejiang)
- Mt. Zigai grotto 紫盖山 (Hubei)

== Sources ==
- Kohn, Livia, ed. Daoism Handbook (Leiden: Brill, 2000).

== See also ==
- Buddhist grottoes (China)
  - Longmen Grottoes
  - Mogao Caves
  - Yungang Grottoes
- Sacred Mountains of China
- Xianren Cave
- Beyul
