= Cishan Dadi =

Chinese mountain and water deity

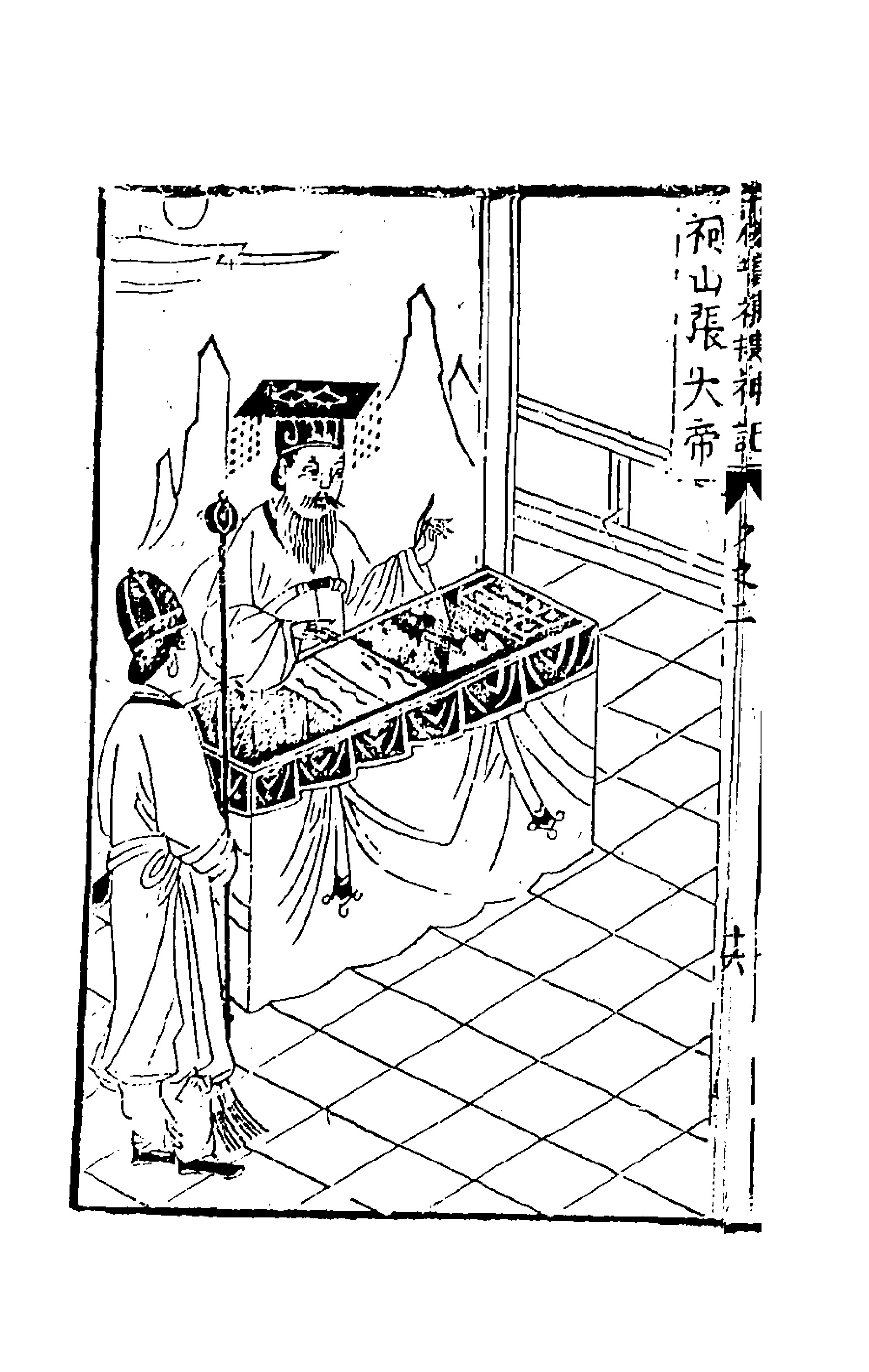
Cishan Dadi

Cishan Wang (Chinese: 祠山王; pinyin: Císhān Wáng; lit. 'King of Mount Ci'), also known as Cishan Dadi (祠山大帝, "Great Emperor of Mount Ci") or Zhang Wang (張王), is a deity in Chinese folk religion. He is worshipped as a mountain and water god in Guangde, Anhui. He is identified with Zhang Bo (張渤), courtesy name Boqi (伯奇). His worship spread across the Jiangnan region during the Song dynasty.

== Legend ==
According to one legend, Zhang Bo was the son of Zhang Bing and a heavenly maiden. He helped control floods and tried to dig a waterway using spirit soldiers. He changed himself into a large pig to help with the work, but his wife saw him. He then stopped digging and went to live on Mount Heng (橫山) in Guangde. People later built a temple there to worship him. Some stories place him in the time of Yu the Great, while others say he lived during the Han dynasty.

== Worship ==
The main temple of Cishan Wang is on Mount Heng, also called Mount Cishan, in Guangde. During the Ming dynasty, his worship was also part of the official religious ceremonies in Nanjing. Officials made offerings to him at Cishan Guanghui Temple (祠山廣惠廟) on the eighteenth day of the second lunar month.
