= The worshipping house for Nguyen Khuyen =

Vietnamese place of worship

The worshipping house for Nguyễn Khuyến is situated in Vị Hà hamlet, Trung Lương village, previously Yên Đổ, Bình Lục district, Hà Nam province in Vietnam.

Nguyễn Khuyến was a poet. His real name was Nguyễn Văn Thắng, but he used the pen names Quế Sơn and Miễn Chi. He was born 15 February 1835, in Hà Nam province. He graduated as a Doctor of Literature (at first class of examination) at the age of 37 and acted as a mandarin of the Nguyễn dynasty for 12 years. Nguyễn Khuyến retired when he was 50 years old and returned to his native land.

The worshipping house consists of three bays built of Lim wood, with brick walls and tiled roofs. Various objects related to Nguyễn Khuyến's life and work have been preserved. The notable items include:

- A picture of Nguyễn Khuyến in which he is wearing a flowing tunic and a satin turban and looking at a very small cup.
- A cane pipe with fine carving on it and a trunk of books, containing his dissertations written when he was young.
- Two tablets with the characters "An Tự Vinh Quy" (i.e. honourably returning home with great favour and in trappings) bestowed by king Tu Duc. A rolling book with Doctor Dương Khuê's essay of congratulations.
- A pair of wood panels on which the contrast couplet was engraved, offered by the Governor of Ninh Bình and Thái Bình provinces.

Beside those, precious objects can be seen inside and outside the House, such as the rockwork and the ornate sindora wood bed that Nguyễn Khuyến used to lie on in the last years of his life.

The landscape in the area is beautiful: a fruit orchard with various trees such as longans, shaddocks, cocoas, oranges; and numerous flowers: tuberoses, michelians, roses, and cycads. Kumquats and chrysanthemums, adored by the Poet when he was alive, also can be seen in the garden.

The Nguyễn Khuyến worshipping house was acknowledged by the Vietnamese government as a history cultural relic in December, 1991.

== See also ==
- Nguyễn Khuyến
- Hà Nam Province
