= Base 603 =

Spaceport

Coordinates: 30°57′N 119°13′E

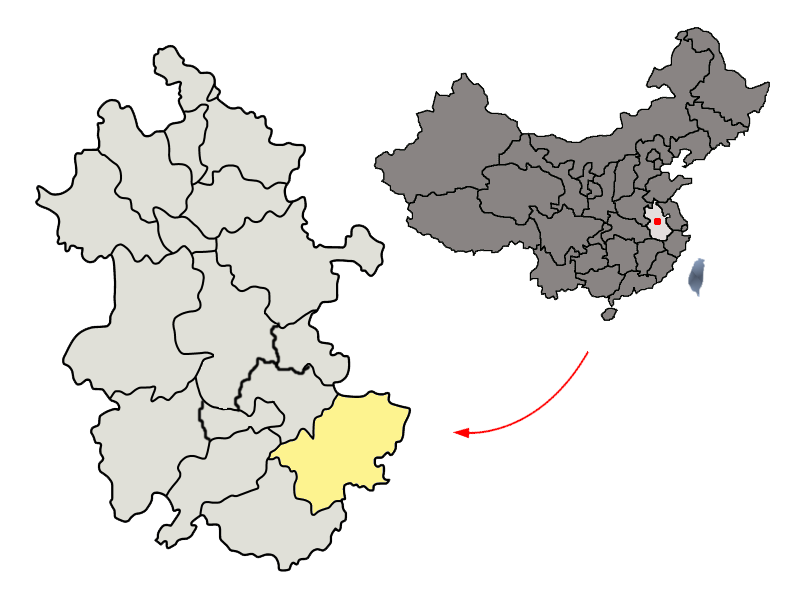
Location of Xuancheng Prefecture.

Guangde Rocket Launch Site (simplified Chinese: 广德火箭发射场; traditional Chinese: 廣德火箭發射場; pinyin: Guǎngdé Huǒjiàn Fāshè Chǎng) also known as Base 603 (603基地) is a suborbital launch site that was operated by the Chinese Academy of Sciences located in Shijiedu (誓节渡), Shijie Town (誓节镇), Guangde County, Xuancheng Prefecture, Anhui province on the Chinese east coast.

The location of the site was surrounded by mountains in four directions, with no roads and no access to resources, but it was chosen as an upgrade to the too limited facilities of the Nanhui Launch Site.

== History ==
The construction of the launch site was started in March 1960 under the direction of Department 581 (including the Second Geophysics Institute), and completed in less than six months, including a weather station, radars, control and tracking stations, launch pad, service tower, propellant storage room, propulsion testing facilities, living quarters, etc.

The launch center was first directed by the Institute of Geology and Geophysics Chinese Academy of Sciences (地球物理所), then in June 1960 by the Shanghai Institute of Mechanical and Electrical Engineering (上海市机电设计研究院). Finally the Fifth Academy of the Ministry of National Defence (国防部第五研究院) took control in 1963.

China launched its first ever successful T-7 sounding rocket in September 1960.

From 1960 to 1966, several of the T-7 and T-7A sounding rockets were launched at the site.

The first successful flight of a biological experimental T-7A/S1 sounding rocket transporting eight white mice was launched and recovered on July 19, 1964.

The last launch was reportedly that of a dog aboard a T-7A/S2 on 28 July 1966.

== See also ==
- Chinese space program
