= Jade Books in Heaven =

Books in Daoist canon

Jade Books (玉書) are described in several scriptures of the Daoist canon as existent primordially in the various divine Heavens. These Jade Books are variously said to be instrumental in creating and maintaining the divine structure of the universe, or as regulating national or personal destiny.

- In the Vacuous Cavern primordium, before the separation of heaven-and-earth, there existed, in the primaeval darkness, the "5-Ancients Jade Chapters" (五老玉篇). The titles of these are :
1. Spirit-generating perfection-treasuring stanzas of the Cavern of Profundity
2. Heaven-penetrating Southern Clouds Treasure Numinous Writ
3. Numinous book of the Nine Heavens of Cavernous Moisture of the Treasure Kalpa
4. Subtle chapter of the Bright Cavern of Golden Perfection
5. Treasured Bright writ of the perfection-generating Primordial Spirit
- In Highest Clarity heaven are the "Jade Tablets of the Wisdom Manuscript" : parts of these reveal the inner names of the 10,000 spirits. (Compare the esoteric Shin-gon list of 10,000 Buddha-s.)
- In the Azure palace in Highest Clarity heaven are jade tablets registering the names and the nomenclatures of those adepts who are destined to ascend to the asterisms in broad daylight.

== "Heaven"-related books composed of other semi-precious stones ==
In Sumerian lore, "(Nisaba) continually gets advice from a tablet of lapis lazuli. ... Nisaba consults a lapis tablet for advice about the 'star-chart' (mul-an) ... . The subject in our text is also consulting the star chart from a tablet made of a precious stone (giš-nu11-gal)". This subject is Pú-ta ('Foundling'), the demonic scribe.

According to traditional teachings of Judaism in the Talmud, the Ten Commandments were engraved on blue sapphire stone as a symbolic reminder of the sky, the heavens, and ultimately of God's throne. Many Torah scholars, however, have opined that the Biblical "sapir" was, in fact, the lapis lazuli (see Exodus 24:10, lapis lazuli is a possible alternate rendering of "sapphire" the stone pavement under God's feet when the intention to craft the tablets of the covenant is disclosed Exodus 24:12).

In Muslim mystical lore, the archangel ʼIsrafʼil is owner of a "jewelled tablet of fate". "The Tablet of Destiny was made out of an immense white pearl, and it has two leaves like those of a door. There are learned men who assert that these leaves are formed out of two red rubies". (Possibly a reference to mercury produced by cinnabar.)

In Hellenistic lore, there is the Emerald Tablet of Hermēs Tris-megistos (Hermēs 'Thrice-Greatest').

The Akashic records in the modern Western philosophies of Edgar Cayce are a similar concept.

== Bibliography ==
- Gil Raz : Creation of Tradition : the Five Talismans of the Numinous Treasure. PhD dissertation, Indiana University, 2004. http://texts.00.gs/Daoism_PhD_diss,_2004.htm
- Shawn Eichman : Converging Paths : Daoism during the Six Dynasties. PhD dissertation, University of Hawai'i, 1999. http://texts.00.gs/Daoism_PhD_diss,_1999.htm
- TEXTE UND MATERIALIEN DER FRAU PROFESSOR HILPRECHT COLLECTION OF BABYLONIAN ANTIQUITIES IM EIGENTUM DER FRIEDRICH SCHILLER-UNIVERSITÄT JENA, Band 6 = Johannes J. A. van Dijk & Markham J. Geller : Ur III Incantations. Harrassowitz Verlag, Wiesbaden, 2003. http://texts.00.gs/Ur_III_Incantations.htm
