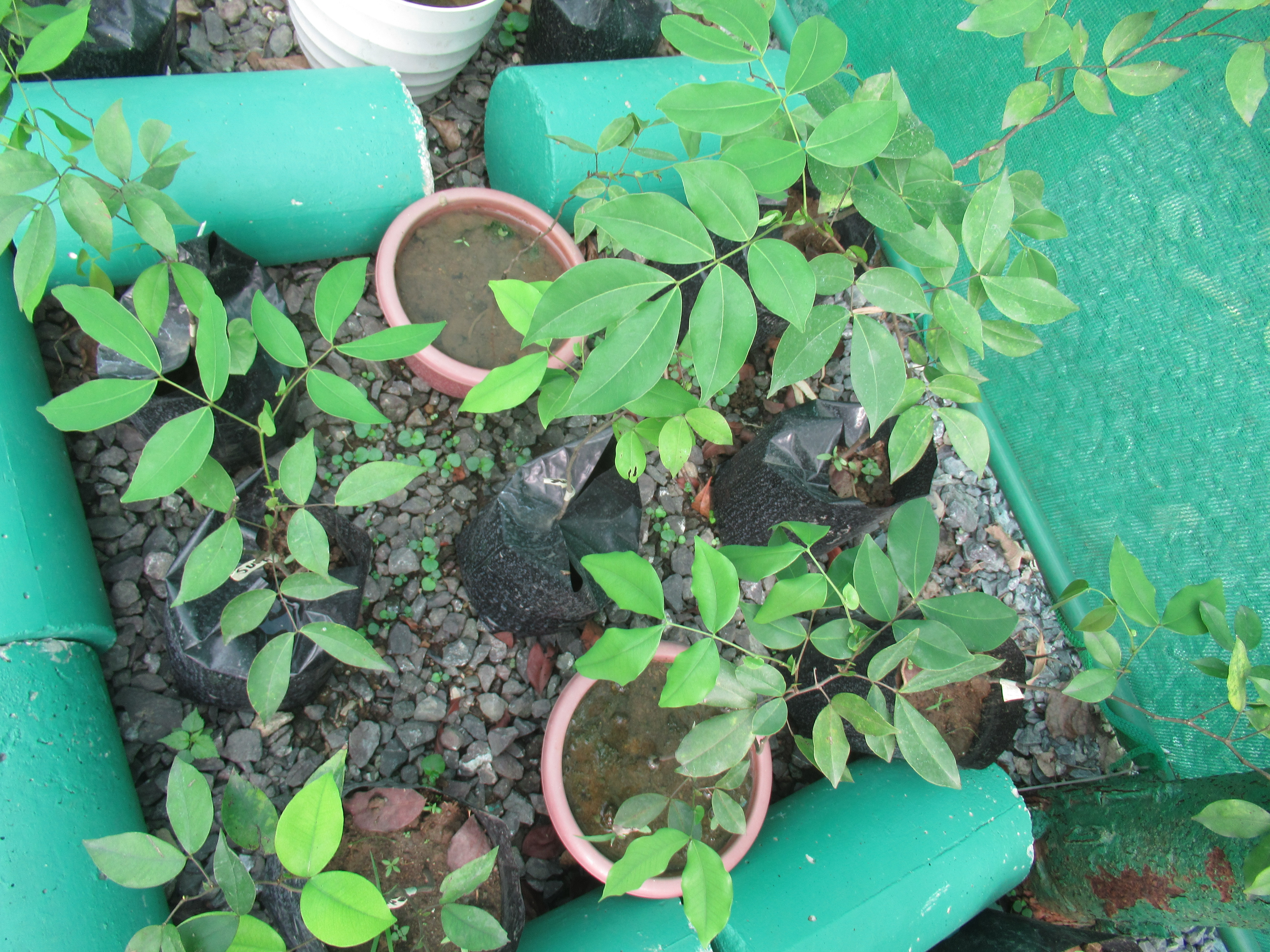

Conservation status
- Vulnerable (IUCN 3.1)

Scientific classification
- Kingdom: Plantae
- Clade: Tracheophytes
- Clade: Angiosperms
- Clade: Eudicots
- Clade: Rosids
- Order: Fabales
- Family: Fabaceae
- Genus: Sindora
- Species: S. supa

Binomial name
- Sindora supa Merr.

= Sindora supa =

Species of legume

Sindora supa is a species of plant in the family Fabaceae. It is endemic to the Philippines. It is threatened by habitat loss.
