= Sindora beccariana =

Conservation status
- Data Deficient (IUCN 2.3)

Scientific classification
- Kingdom: Plantae
- Clade: Tracheophytes
- Clade: Angiosperms
- Clade: Eudicots
- Clade: Rosids
- Order: Fabales
- Family: Fabaceae
- Genus: Sindora
- Species: S. beccariana

Binomial name
- Sindora beccariana Backer ex de Wit

Species of legume

Sindora beccariana is a species of plant in the family Fabaceae. It is a tree found in Borneo. It is threatened by habitat loss.
