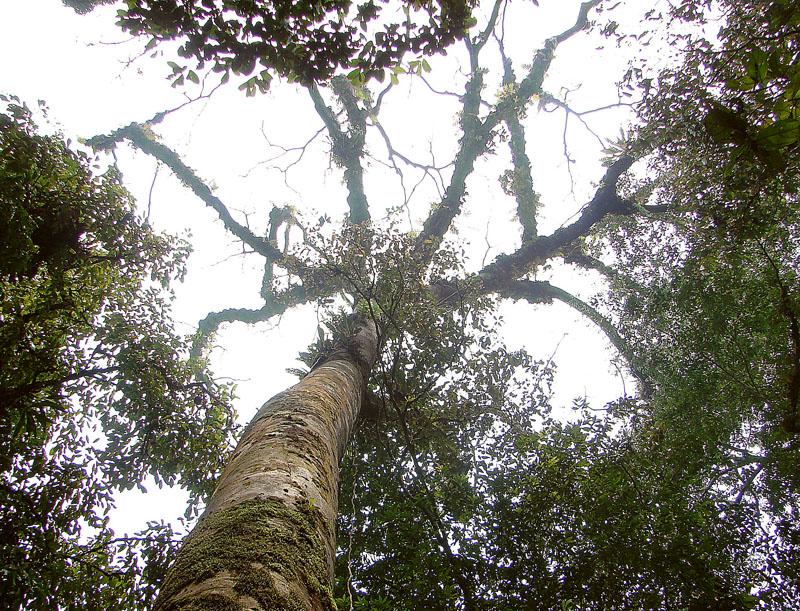
- Sindora sp.

Scientific classification
- Kingdom: Plantae
- Clade: Tracheophytes
- Clade: Angiosperms
- Clade: Eudicots
- Clade: Rosids
- Order: Fabales
- Family: Fabaceae
- Subfamily: Detarioideae
- Tribe: Detarieae
- Genus: Sindora; Miq., 1861

Synonyms
- Echinocalyx Benth.

= Sindora =

Genus of legumes

Sindora is a genus of legume in the family Fabaceae.

== Species ==
Sindora comprises the following species:

- Sindora affinis de Wit
- Sindora beccariana Backer ex de Wit
- Sindora bruggemanii de Wit
- Sindora coriacea (Baker) Prain
- Sindora echinocalyx Prain
- Sindora galedupa Prain
- Sindora glabra Merr. ex de Wit
- Sindora inermis Merr.
- Sindora irpicina de Wit
- Sindora javanica (Koord. & Valeton) Backer ex K.Heyne
- Sindora klaineana Pierre ex Pellegr.
- Sindora laotica Gagnep.
- Sindora leiocarpa Backer ex K.Heyne & de Wit
- Sindora siamensis Teijsm. ex Miq.
- Sindora stipitata Chatan & Promprom
- Sindora sumatrana Miq.
- Sindora supa Merr.
- Sindora tonkinensis A.Chev. ex K.Larsen & S.S.Larsen
- Sindora velutina Baker
- Sindora wallichii Benth.
- Sindora × changiensis L.M.Choo, Loo, W.F.Ang & Er
