= Sindora inermis =

Conservation status
- Vulnerable (IUCN 2.3)

Scientific classification
- Kingdom: Plantae
- Clade: Tracheophytes
- Clade: Angiosperms
- Clade: Eudicots
- Clade: Rosids
- Order: Fabales
- Family: Fabaceae
- Genus: Sindora
- Species: S. inermis

Binomial name
- Sindora inermis Merr.

Species of legume

Sindora inermis is a species of plant in the family Fabaceae. It is a tree found in Sumatra and the Philippines. It is threatened by habitat loss.
