= Nguyễn Khuyến =

Vietnamese poet

- Vietnamese alphabet: Nguyễn Thắng
- Chữ Hán: 阮勝

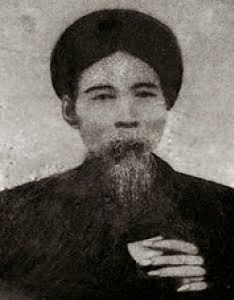
Nguyễn Khuyến in 1905

- Nguyễn Khuyến
- Vietnamese alphabet: Nguyễn Khuyến
- Chữ Hán: 阮勸

Nguyễn Thắng, pen name Nguyễn Khuyến, (15 February 1835 in Ý Yên, Nam Định – 5 February 1910 in Yên Đổ) was a Vietnamese Ruist scholar, poet and teacher living in the 19th century.

== Early life ==
Nguyễn Thắng was born on 15 February 1835 in his mother's hometown Văn Khế village, Hoàng Xá commune, Ý Yên district, Nam Định Province. His father's home town was Và village, Yên Đổ commune, Bình Lục district, Hà Nam Province. His father Nguyễn Tông Khởi (1796–1853) was a teacher. His mother was Trần Thị Thoan (1799–1874) and her father was Trần Công Trạc. Nguyễn Thắng studied to become a mandarin (the governing class of Vietnam). His first teacher was Phạm Văn Nghị. Although he was intelligent and knowledgeable, he did not initially fare well in his examinations. In 1864, he passed the Cử nhân degree (or: Hương Cống, Chinese: 鄉貢, the lowest degree of Vietnamese feudal educational system) at first-rate (Masters level) in Hà Nội. One year later, unfortunately, he failed his doctoral examination Hội examination so he went to Hanoi to study at Quốc Tử Giám (National University).

To instil himself with iron discipline and motivate himself, he changed his given name from Nguyễn Thắng to Nguyễn Khuyến. In the Vietnamese language, Thắng only means success or victory but Khuyến has a stronger meaning implying inspiration or stimulation; Thắng is the result but Khuyến is the way toward the result (Vietnamese people have a tradition named "Khuyến Học"- Study Encouragement). After six years of preparation, he passed the Hội Nguyên degree and the Đình Nguyên degree—his doctorate—continuously in only one year in 1871. This was an extraordinary accomplishment rarely seen throughout history, so people gave him an honourable name: "Tam Nguyên Yên Đổ" (Yên Đổ's first-rate graduate in three times).

== Career ==
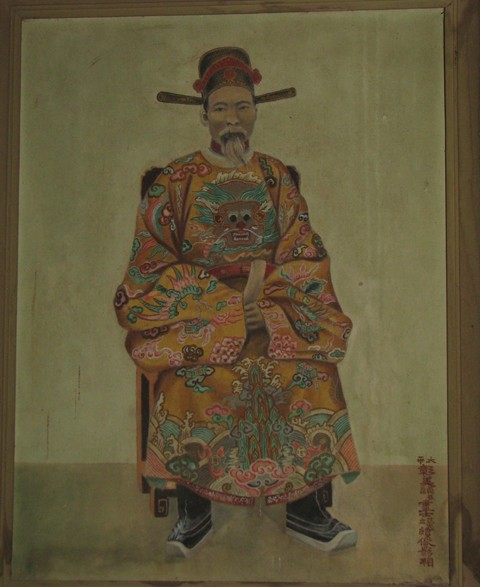
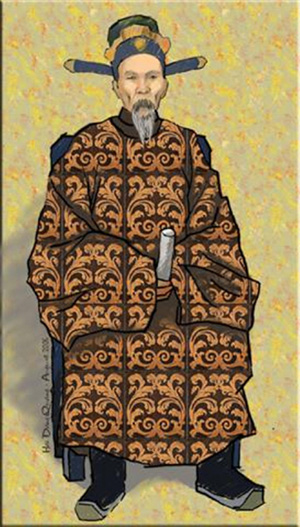
Nguyễn Khuyến wears Quan phục

Nguyễn Khuyến was a mandarin in the age of the French invasions. History unfolded like the text he wrote in his Đình Nguyên examination twelve years before: "As a carriage does not come toward because the horses do not want to pull, the political situation does not improve when the people do not want it to. Are there no talents in life? It is completely untrue." When patriotic movements such as "Cần Vương" ("Helping the King") were extinguished and his dream of "Trị quốc, bình thiên hạ" (leading the country, pacifying the world) was not realized, he landed in an impasse. He recognized his powerlessness to change conditions in the country and was deeply aware of the decline of Vietnamese feudalism. He was one of the first Vietnamese people to criticize Vietnamese feudalism as conservative and unrealistic. In 1884, he withdrew from public life and moved back to his home town Yên Đổ to support the Vietnamese resistance against the French enemy. There he lived a simple and life in the countryside.

== Later life ==
The more adversity he met in his life, the more talented he became in his writing. He was the nexus between classical and modern Vietnamese literature. He was both a prominent lyric poet and an outstanding satirical poet. He reached the peak of Nôm letter's literature. He was the first Vietnamese poet who put opinions about current matters in classical poems. Among his best poems are: "Group of three poems about Autumn: Fishing in Autumn, Drinking in Autumn, Versing on Autumn" which express sadness and loneliness and "Paper Doctor" which ridicules incapable scholars. In addition, he was one of the few upper-class poets who wrote favourably about poor farmers. Throughout his life he taught his children to show deep gratitude toward farmers: "Even if you are a scholar, do not forget rice, beans and eggplants."

He died on 5 February 1910 in his hometown Yên Đổ.

== See also ==
- Phan Đình Phùng
- Tự Đức
- The worshipping house for Nguyen Khuyen
