= Macaque Cave =

Cave on the island of Hainan in China

Coordinates: 18.9490°N 109.0485°E

- 獼猴洞
- Location: Macaque Ridge, Dongfang City, Hainan Province, China
- Geology: Karst
- Entrances: 1

The Macaque Cave (simplified Chinese: 猕猴洞; traditional Chinese: 獼猴洞; pinyin: Míhóu Dòng) is a karst cave located on the Macaque Ridge (猕猴岭) outside Dongfang City, Hainan, People's Republic of China.

== Description ==
The cave covers an area of 2,000 m^{2} (22,000 sq ft) whilst at the entrance there are densely packed Sindora glabra and Chinese redbud trees. About 5 metres (16 ft) inside the cave there is a rock formation that looks like an old woman. There are also stalactites and rocks within the cave in the shape of macaques, lions and tigers. Set into the cave wall there are two chambers that look like the cloisters of a monastery.
