= Old Guangde dialect =

Northern Wu Chinese dialect of Anhui, China

- 老廣德話
- Native to: People's Republic of China
- Region: Guangde county in Anhui province
- Language family: Sino-Tibetan: Sinitic; Wu; Taihu; Su-Jia-Hu; Old Guangde dialect

Language codes
- ISO 639-3: –
- Linguist List: wuu-tai
- Glottolog: None

The Old Guangde dialect is a Northern Wu dialect spoken in southeastern Anhui province in southeastern Guangde county, China. It is now losing ground to the New Guangde dialect, a Jianghuai Mandarin dialect. It is closely related to Shanghainese and the Suzhou dialect, but its closest relative is the Huzhou dialect. It is a Northern Wu dialect exclave surrounded by speakers of Jianghuai Mandarin and Xuanzhou Wu.

== Phonology ==
=== Initials ===
p	布別	pʰ	怕泡	b	步盤	m	門妹	f	飛夫	v	符飯
t	到黨	tʰ	太討	d	同地	l	難路
k	高貴	kʰ	開快	g	葵	ŋ	牙硬	h	灰化	ɦ	話紅
ʨ	精檢主	ʨʰ	秋去醜	ʥ	旗橋	ȵ	女日硯	ɕ	修收書	ʑ	玄蛇
ts	招爭祖	tsʰ	昌倉初	dz	曹蟲鋤			s	三生聲	z	上
Ø	耳姨午雲

=== Finals ===
ɿ	絲支	i	蛇爺天弟飛	u	古午	ʮ	雨書
ɚ	耳兒
a	爬啞	ia	亞架	ua	瓜話
ɛ	袋膽	iɛ	香張	uɛ	怪關
		ie	姐
ɯ	猴盤短岸	iɯ	流手	uɯ	官碗
o	河
ɔ	保桃	iɔ	條繞
ei	被妹	uei	桂灰			yei	水船圓
en	根門	in	心認	un	溫魂	yn	雲閏
aŋ	黨床	iaŋ	將揚	uaŋ	光黃
oŋ	從紅翁	ioŋ	窮雄
aʔ	辣甲 白讀	iaʔ	甲腳藥	uaʔ	刮滑
əʔ	色割白北百	iəʔ	踢鐵熱			yəʔ	缺月
oʔ	綠合落郭	ioʔ	欲約確	uoʔ	谷國活
m̩	姆

== Tones ==
Traditional description	Tone	Examples
陰平 Yin Ping	34(33)	高天三開
陽平 Yang Ping	14	陳盤窮田
陰上 Yin Shang	54(55)	古姐麻娘
陽上 Yang Shang	21	老女近父
去聲 Qu Sheng	324	蓋放岸用 共大樹飯
陰入 Yin Ru	5	急尺藥合
陰上 Yin Shang	12	食讀服實
