= Sindora javanica =

Conservation status
- Endangered (IUCN 3.1)

Scientific classification
- Kingdom: Plantae
- Clade: Embryophytes
- Clade: Tracheophytes
- Clade: Spermatophytes
- Clade: Angiosperms
- Clade: Eudicots
- Clade: Rosids
- Order: Fabales
- Family: Fabaceae
- Genus: Sindora
- Species: S. javanica

Binomial name
- Sindora javanica (Koord. & Valeton) Backer ex K.Heyne

Synonyms
- Sindora sumatrana var. javanica Koord. & Valeton; Sindora sumatrana var. stipulata Moll & Janssonius

Species of legume

Sindora javanica is a species of plant in the family Fabaceae. It is a tree endemic to Java in Indonesia.
