= Luobi Cave =

Cave and archaeological site in China

Coordinates: 18.3304°N 109.5478°E

- Interactive map of Luobi Cave
- Location: Lizhigou Town (荔枝沟镇), Hainan Province, People's Republic of China

Luobi Cave (simplified Chinese: 落笔洞; traditional Chinese: 落筆洞; pinyin: Luòbǐ Dòng; lit. 'hanging pen cave') is a karst cave under the west face of Yin Ridge (印岭) located 7 km (4.3 mi) north east of Lizhigou Town (荔枝沟镇), 15 km (9.3 mi) from Sanya City, Hainan Province, People's Republic of China.

== Features ==
The entrance to the cave is approximately 12 m (39 ft) high and 9 m (30 ft) wide. Inside the apex reaches a height of 18 m (59 ft) with a floor area of about 140 m^{2} (1,500 sq ft) Two large stalactites hang down from the roof like large pens, hence the cave's name.

== History ==
A number of inscriptions carved into the walls of the cave are believed to date to the Yuan Dynasty (1271–1368). One of these refers to the precise date of 1283 CE. Luobi Cave is later mentioned in Ming Dynasty records for Hainan (琼台志) compiled at the time of the Zhengde Emperor (r. 1505–1525 CE) which note the cave's stalactites and their unending flow of water.

== Archaeological finds ==
Between 1992 and 1993, archaeologists carried out a comprehensive excavation and survey of the Luobi Cave over an area of 70 m^{2} (750 sq ft). They discovered eight fossilised human teeth, stone and bone tools, as well as several hundred fossilised animal bones, more than 70,000 sea shells and evidence of ancient fires. Radiocarbon dating techniques show that the finds are from the late Upper Paleolithic era around 10,000 years ago and represent the earliest evidence of human activity in Hainan as well as the southernmost occurrence of stone tools from this period. Very few fossilised fish bones were discovered at the Luobi site, indicating that the inhabitants of the cave had yet to master the skill of fishing. The few fish they did obtain were probably found in rocky pools along the coast having been swept ashore.

Since 2001 the Luobi Cave has been a national protected cultural site.

== Folklore ==
According to legend, anyone coming into contact with water dripping from Luobi Cave's stalactites will become a talented writer whilst a number of large flat rocks scattered across the floor of the cave are said to be inkstones once used by Taoist Immortals. The smaller Xianlang Cave (仙朗洞) nearby is claimed to have been the home of female immortal who descended from heaven and married a man from the local Li minority.

== See also ==
- List of caves in China
- List of longest caves
