= Sindora tonkinensis =

Conservation status
- Data Deficient (IUCN 2.3)

Scientific classification
- Kingdom: Plantae
- Clade: Tracheophytes
- Clade: Angiosperms
- Clade: Eudicots
- Clade: Rosids
- Order: Fabales
- Family: Fabaceae
- Genus: Sindora
- Species: S. tonkinensis

Binomial name
- Sindora tonkinensis A. Chev.

Species of legume

Sindora tonkinensis is a species of legume in the family Fabaceae. This up to 15 m (49 ft) tall tree is native to Cambodia and Vietnam, and it is cultivated in Guangdong in southern China.

A slow-growing tree, sparsely but widely distributed in remaining areas of primary and slightly disturbed forest, Sindora tonkinensis provides high-quality wood which is highly sought after as a material for luxury furniture. It is threatened by habitat loss. IUCN Red List placed its Conservation status at DD (Data Deficient).

== Habitat ==
They are found mostly in tropical evergreen forests on Annamite Range that run along the Vietnamese - Cambodia border. In Vietnam, mountainous areas on the north like Quảng Ninh Province and Bắc Giang Province are also the house of the species. Sindora tonkinensis lives where there are fertile topsoil and good natural irrigation, at the height less than 600m from the sea level.

== Usage ==
The wood of Sindora tonkinensis tree has a dark brown shade with fine grains. It rarely, if at all suffers from termite infestation, and so is mostly used to make luxury furniture.

Vietnamese fishermen have long used Sindora tonkinensis rind, which is rich of Tannin, as a bait for fishes. Also, its flowers are sought by beekeeper who wishes to produce very high-quality honey.
