= Shijie, Anhui =

Town in Guangde City, Anhui, China

Shijie 誓节镇
- Town
- Interactive map of Shijie
- Coordinates: 30°56′19″N 119°13′29″E
- Country: People's Republic of China
- Province: Anhui
- Prefecture-level city: Xuancheng
- County-level city: Guangde
- Time zone: UTC+8 (China Standard)

Shijie (誓节镇) is a town in Guangde City, Anhui, China.
