= Yilong Cave =

Cave in Pingxiang, Jiangxi, China

- Interactive map of Yilong Cave
- Location: Pingxiang City, Jiangxi Province, People's Republic of China
- Length: 4,200 metres (13,800 ft)

Yilong Cave (simplified Chinese: 义龙洞; traditional Chinese: 義龍洞; pinyin: Yìlóng Dòng; lit. 'righteous dragon cave') is a 180-million-year-old karst cave located in Pingxiang City, Jiangxi Province, People's Republic of China. Also known as Nielong Cave (孽龙洞/孽龍洞 literally evil dragon cave), the cave extends to around 4,200 m (13,800 ft) in length. Inside there are unusual rock formations, small streams and waterfalls.

== See also ==
- List of caves in China
- List of longest caves
