= Xianren Cave =

Cave and archaeological site in China

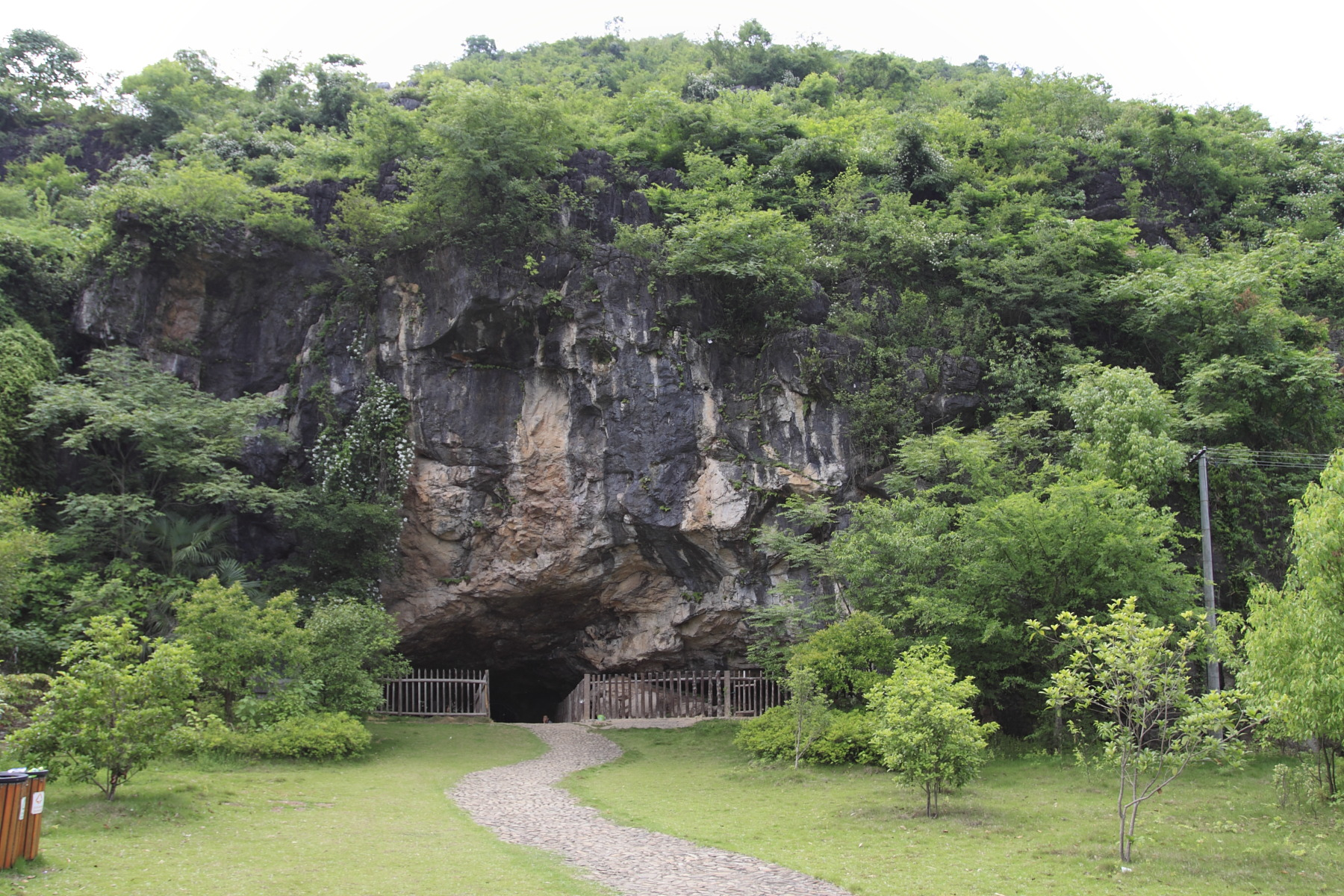

- Location in China
- 28°44′10″N 117°10′25″E
- Periods: Paleolithic China
- Location: Jiangxi
- Region: Southern China

History
- Built: 20,000 BP
- Abandoned: 17,800 BP

Site notes
- Material: Limestone Karst

The Xianren Cave (Chinese: 仙人洞, Xiānréndòng), together with the nearby Diaotonghuan (Chinese: 吊桶环, Diàotǒnghuán) rock shelter, is an archaeological site in Dayuan Township (大源乡), Wannian County in the Jiangxi province, China and a location of historically important discoveries of prehistoric pottery sherds that bears evidence of early rice cultivation. The cave's name refers to the legendary Chinese enlightened people, the Xian "immortals". The cave is 7 m (23.0 ft) high, 11 m (36.1 ft) wide, and 14 m (45.9 ft) deep.

A 2012 publication in the Science journal announced that the earliest pottery yet known anywhere in the world was found at this site dating by radiocarbon to between 20,000 and 19,000 years before present, at the end of the Last Glacial Period. The carbon 14 datation was established by carefully dating surrounding sediments. Many of the pottery fragments had scorch marks, suggesting that the pottery was used for cooking.

These early pottery containers were made well before the invention of agriculture (dated to 10,000 to 8,000 BC), by mobile foragers who hunted and gathered their food during the Late Glacial Maximum.

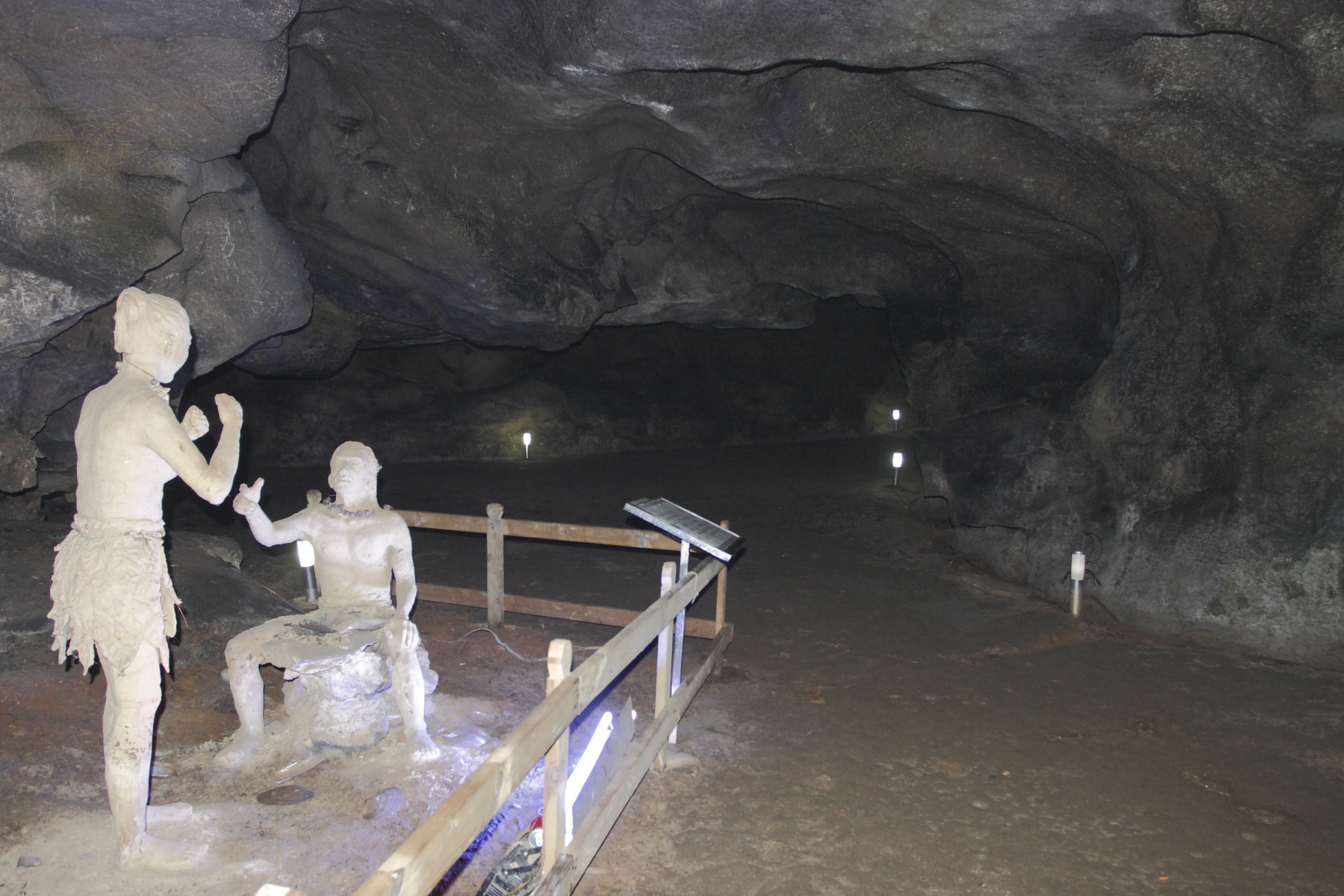
Inside the cave

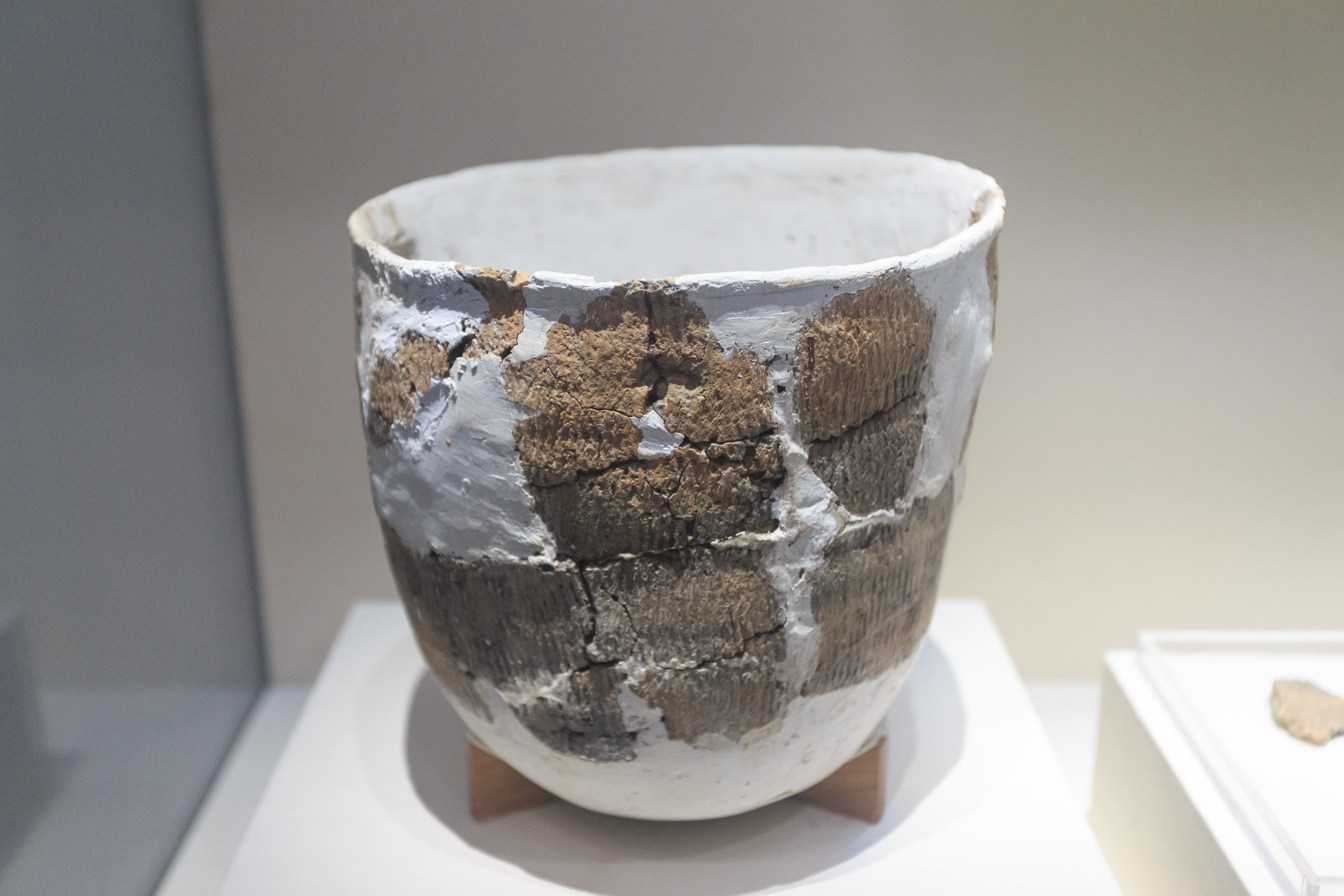
20,000–10,000-year-old pottery found in the cave, with re-construction repairs.

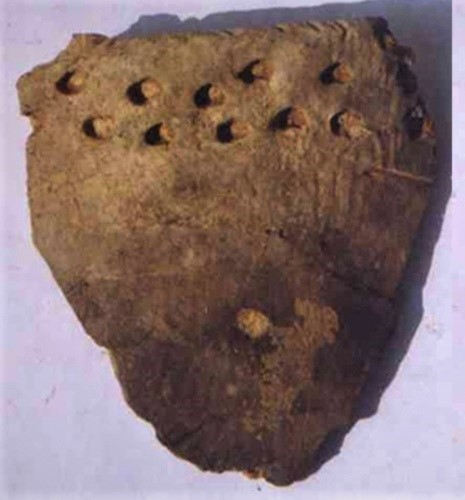
Xianrendong cave pottery fragment, radiocarbon dated to c. 20,000 BP

== See also ==
Location of the Xianren culture
- List of caves in China
- List of Neolithic cultures of China
