= Sindora glabra =

Scientific classification
- Kingdom: Plantae
- Clade: Tracheophytes
- Clade: Angiosperms
- Clade: Eudicots
- Clade: Rosids
- Order: Fabales
- Family: Fabaceae
- Genus: Sindora
- Species: S. glabra

Binomial name
- Sindora glabra Merr. ex. de Wit.

Species of legume

Sindora glabra (Chinese: 油楠; pinyin: Yóunán) is a tree of the family Fabaceae (or Leguminosae) endemic to the People's Republic of China that grows in the provinces of Hainan, Fujian, Guangdong and Yunnan. The species is under second-class national protection in China.

== Habitat and description ==
The species is found growing in mixed forests, on mountain slopes and along riverbanks between sea level and 800 m (2,600 ft). It grows to 8 to 20 metres (26 to 66 ft) tall and has a trunk diameter of 8 to 20 centimetres (3.1 to 7.9 in).

Sindora glabra produces good quality wood used for building houses and making furniture.
