= Binghu Cave =

Karst cave in Zhejiang, China

- 冰壶洞/冰壺洞
- Location within Zhejiang Location within China
- Location: near Jinhua City, Zhejiang, China
- Coordinates: 29.1854036°N 119.6703945°E
- Length: 120 m
- Elevation: 580 m
- Geology: karst

Binghu Cave (simplified Chinese: 冰壶洞; traditional Chinese: 冰壺洞; lit. 'Cold Water Jug Cave') is a karst cave located some 8 km (5.0 mi) from Jinhua City, Zhejiang Province, People's Republic of China.

== Description ==
Access to the site is via a 200 m (660 ft) flight of steps from the adjacent Shuanglong Cave. Together the two caves are known as the "Dragon's Ears" (龙耳/龍耳 Lóng Ĕr). Opened in 1991, the cave lies some 50 m (160 ft) above Shuanglong Cave and takes its name from its shape – that of an old fashioned jade cold water jug. It lies at an altitude of 580 m (1,900 ft) above sea level is about 120 m (390 ft) long. Inside the cave there is a 20 m (66 ft) waterfall whilst overhead there hangs a stalactite that is said to resemble Buddha's hand.

== See also ==
- Shuanglong Cave
