= Shuanglong Cave =

Water-filled karst cave in People's Republic of China

Coordinates: 29°12′10″N 119°37′15″E

Shuanglong Cave (simplified Chinese: 双龙洞; traditional Chinese: 双龍洞; lit. 'Double Dragon Cave') is a water-filled karst cave some 8 km (5.0 mi) from Jinhua City, Zhejiang Province, People's Republic of China.

== Description ==
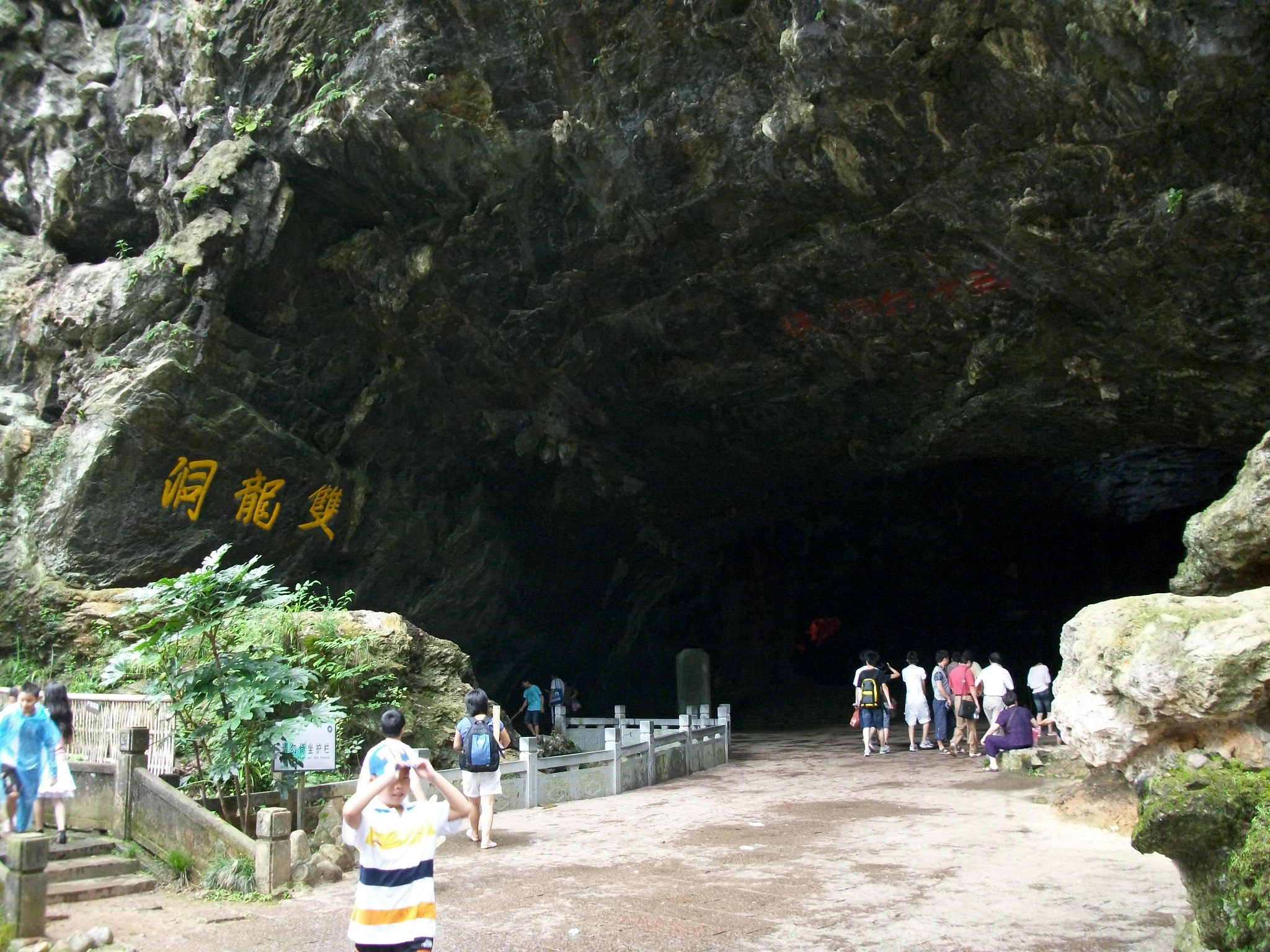
Shuanglong Cave

The cave is 66 m (217 ft) high and 33 m (108 ft) long with a total area in excess of 1,200 m^{2} (13,000 sq ft). Formed around 100 million years ago, the entrance is flanked on both sides by stalactites that resemble dragon heads (龙头/龍头, lóng tóu), hence the Chinese name for the cave. Since the entrance has a clearance of around 30 cm (12 in) above the cave's water level, visitors must lie down in a boat to gain access.

The cave's interior is criss-crossed by stalactites and stalagmites and features an 8 m (26 ft) high stone waterfall.

Shuanglong Cave provides access to the adjacent Binghu Cave via a series of stone steps.

The surrounding Shuanglong Scenic Area (双龙风景名胜区), covering 79.9 km^{2} (30.8 sq mi), is a 5A rated national tourist attraction since 2024 and was 4A since 2007. It contains other karst caves including the Taoyuan Cave (桃源洞), Chaozhen Cave (朝真洞) and Bingbao Cave (冰瀑洞) as well as the following sub-areas:

- Huangdaxian Scenic Area (黄大仙景区)
- Jiafengshan Scenic Area (尖峰山景区)
- Dapantian Scenic Area (大盘天景区)
- Jiayuanli Scenic Area (家园里景区)
- Chisongshan Scenic Area (赤松山景区)

== See also ==
- Binghu Cave
