= Jiangzhou Cave System =

Cave system in Guangxi, China

- Location: Fengshan County, Guangxi, China
- Depth: 357 metres (1,171 ft)
- Length: 53,070 metres (174,110 ft)
- Geology: P,C
- Entrances: 15

Jiangzhou Cave System (Chinese: 江洲洞穴系统) is a cave system near Jiangzhou township, in Fengshan County, Guangxi, China.

This cave has several entrances, with a total of 53.1 km (33.0 mi) of passages having been surveyed. It has an active series running approximately 100 m (330 ft) below the fossil series. It is on the land of Leye-Fengshan Unesco Geopark.

== See also ==
- List of caves in China
- List of longest caves
