= Yiyuan Rong Cave Group =

Cave system in Shandong, China

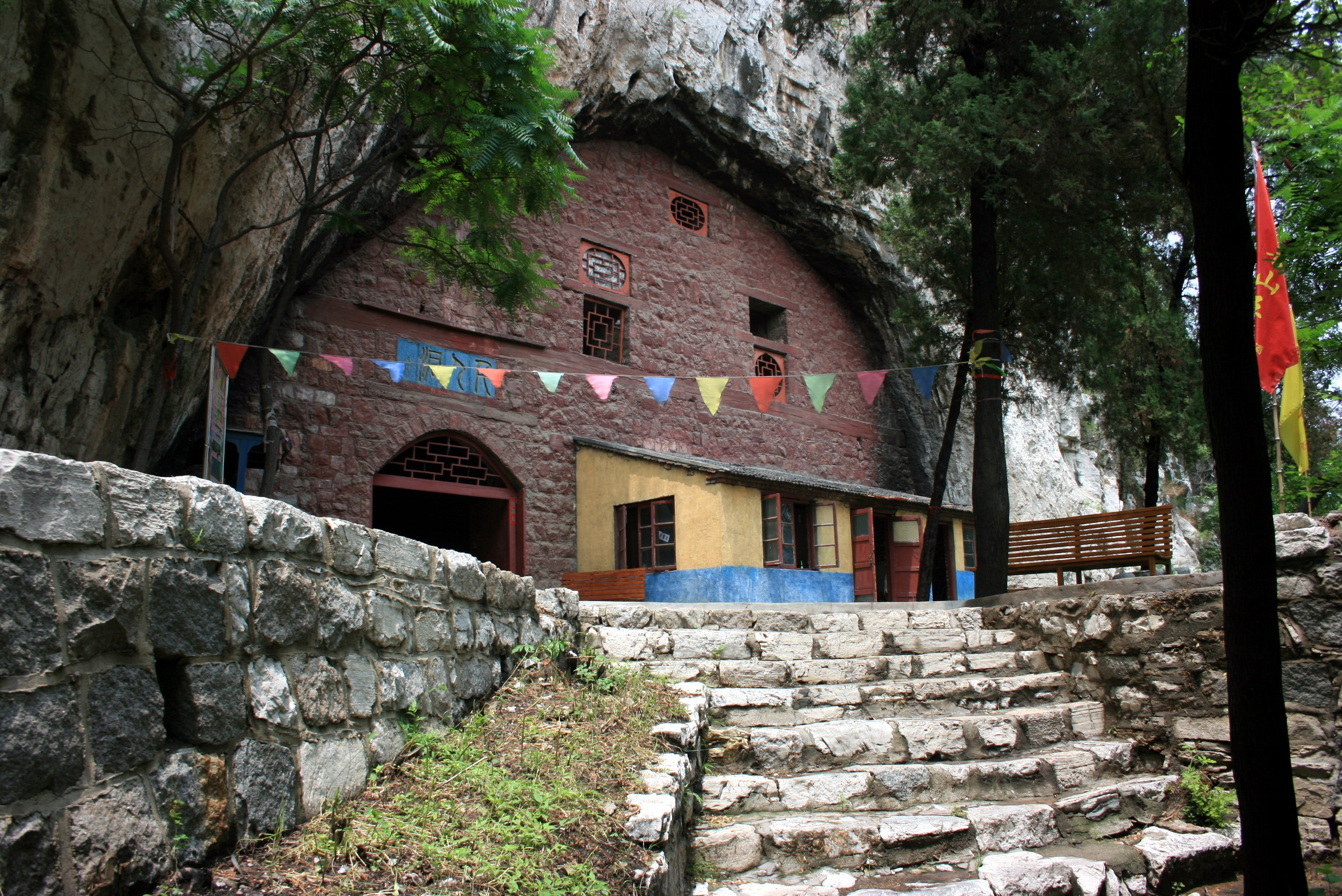
Entrance to the Thousand-Men Cave

The Yiyuan Rong Cave Group (Chinese: 沂源溶洞群; pinyin: Yíyuán Róng Dòng Qún) is a cluster of Ordovician limestone caves in the area under the administration of the city of Zibo, Shandong Province, China. Rong Cave proper (Chinese: 沂源溶洞; pinyin: Yíyuán Róng Dòng, 36.268428°N 118.070669°E) is the namesake of the cave group. It is located about 13 kilometres (8.1 mi) to the north of the town of Tumen (Chinese: 土门镇; pinyin: Tǔmén Zhèn). The cave group contains more than 40 caves in total and is the largest cluster of limestone caves in China north of the Yangtze River. It covers an area of approximately 10 square kilometers. Other major caves in the group are Thousand-Men Cave (Chinese: 千人洞; pinyin: Qiānrén Dòng), Resting Cave (Chinese: 养神洞; pinyin: Yǎngshén Dòng), Stone-Dragon Cave (Chinese: 石龙洞; pinyin: Shílóng Dòng), Xuanyun Cave (Chinese: 玄云洞; pinyin: Xuányún Dòng), Nine-Skies Cave (Chinese: 九天洞; pinyin: Jiǔtiān Dòng), Coral Cave (Chinese: 珊瑚洞; pinyin: Shānhú Dòng), Lingzhi Cave (Chinese: 灵芝洞; pinyin: Língzhī Dòng, after the Lingzhi mushroom), Shenxian Cave (Chinese: 神仙洞; pinyin: Shénxiān Dòng), and Xiaya Cave (Chinese: 下崖洞; pinyin: Xiàyá Dòng, 36.243443°N 118.124399°E). The Thousand-Men Cave was used as an arsenal by the Eighth Route Army from September 1938 to March 1939. Some of the major caves in the group have been made accessible to tourists as they are popular attractions.
