= Guangde =

Guangde 广德市 Kwangteh
- County-level city
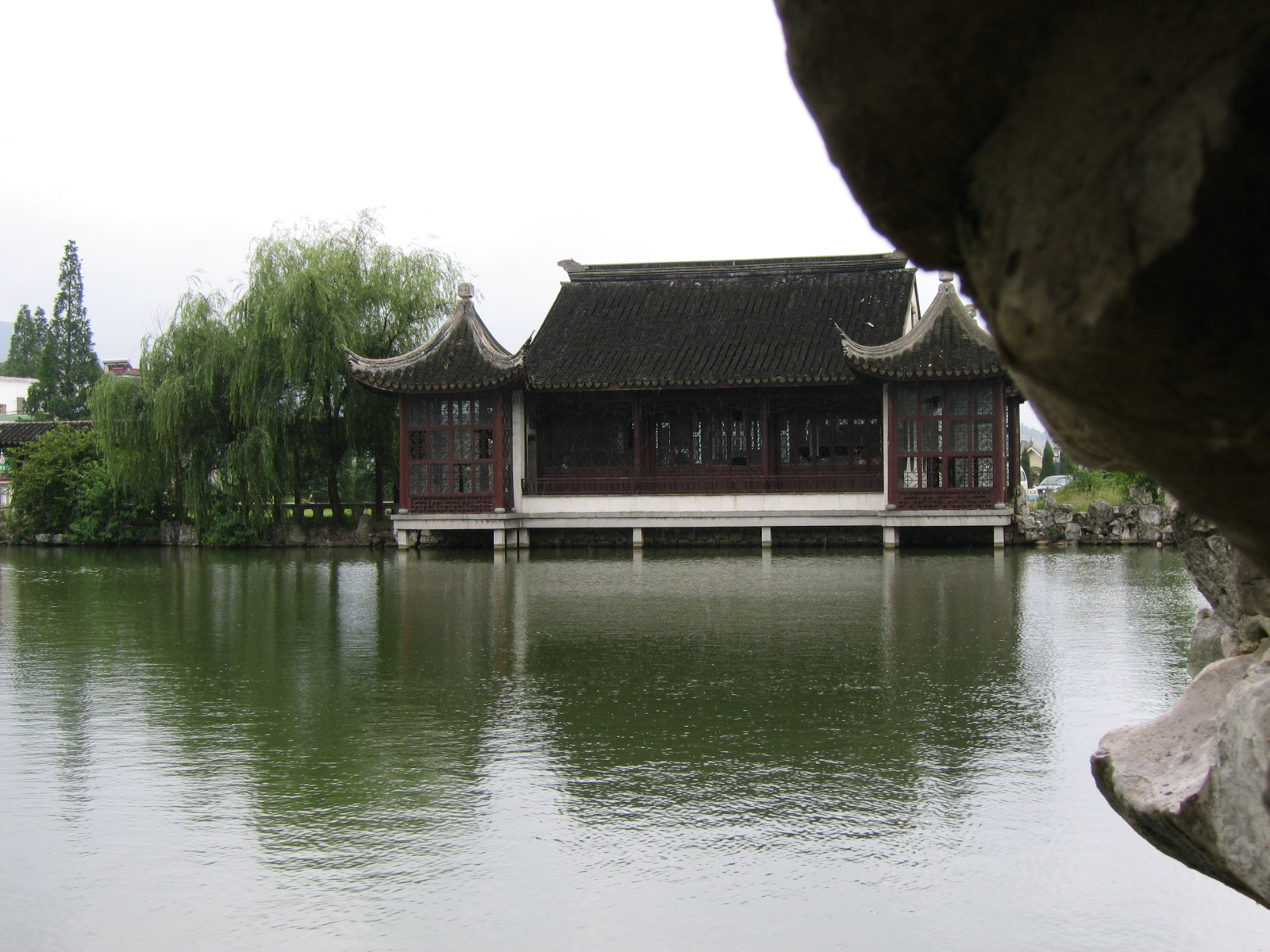
- Taijidong, Guangde, Anhui

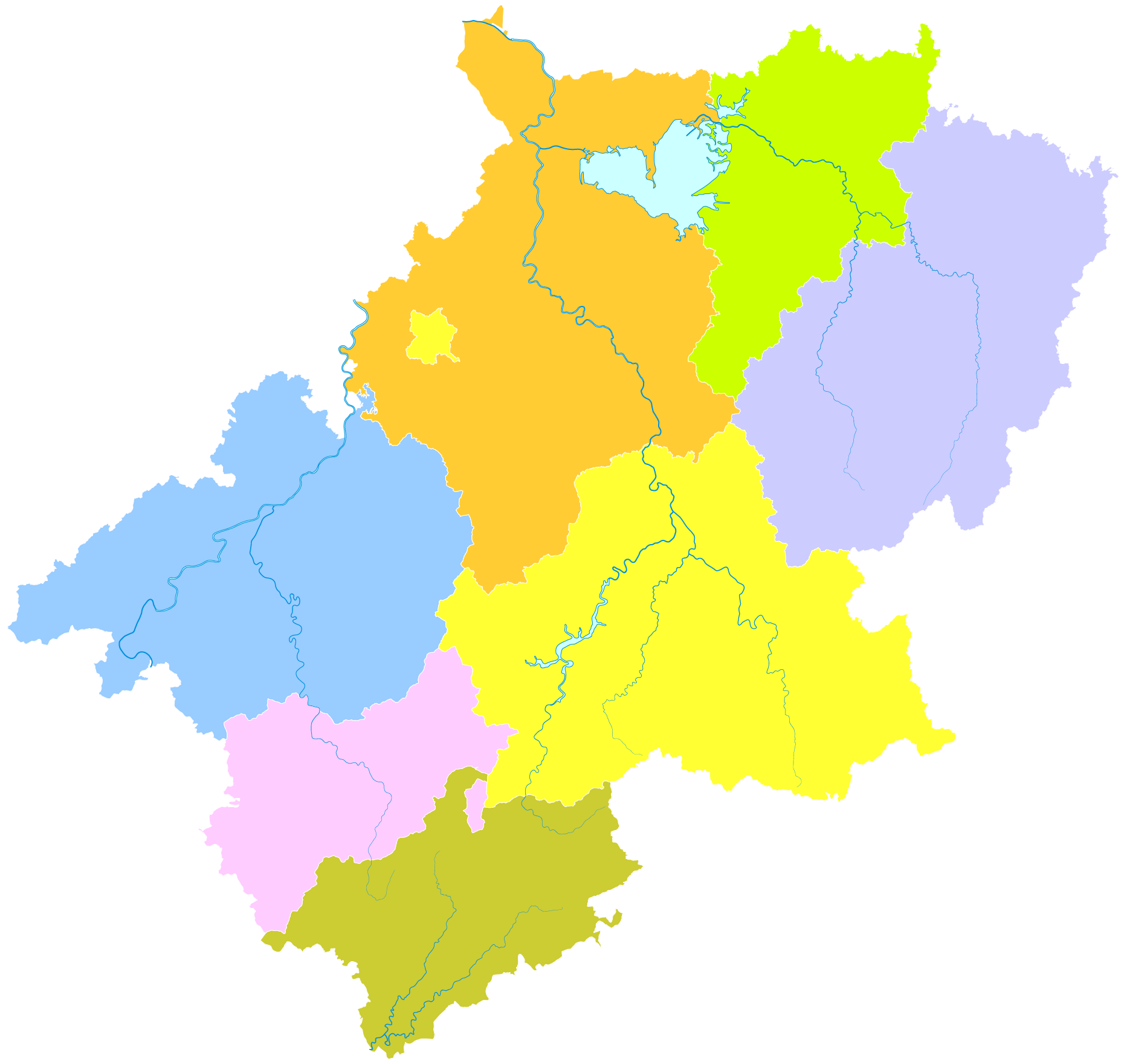
- Guangde is the easternmost division in this map of Xuancheng

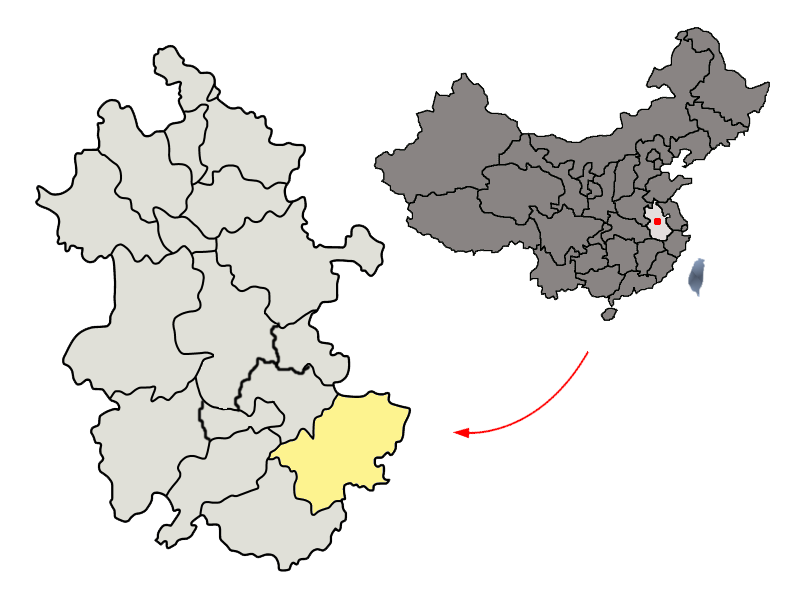
- Xuancheng in Anhui
- Coordinates: 30°52′41″N 119°25′16″E
- Country: People's Republic of China
- Province: Anhui
- Prefecture-level city: Xuancheng

Area
  - Total: 2,165 km^{2} (836 sq mi)

Population (2019)
  - Total: 508,000
  - Density: 235/km^{2} (608/sq mi)
- Time zone: UTC+8 (China Standard)
- Postal code: 242200

Guangde is a county-level city in the southeast of Anhui Province, People's Republic of China, bordering the provinces of Jiangsu to the north and Zhejiang to the east and south. It is the easternmost county-level division of Anhui and is under the jurisdiction of the prefecture-level city Xuancheng within Anhui Province. The city has a population of 510,000 and an area of 2,165 km^{2} (836 sq mi). The seat of government is at Taozhou Town.

Guangde
- Simplified Chinese: 广德
- Traditional Chinese: 廣德
Transcriptions
Standard Mandarin
- Hanyu Pinyin: Guǎngdé
Wu
- Romanization: kuaon teh

Guangde has jurisdiction over six towns and ten townships.

== Administrative divisions ==
Guangde City is divided to 5 towns and 4 townships.

Towns

- Taozhou (桃州镇)
- Xinhang (新杭镇)
- Qiucun (邱村镇)
- Baidian (柏垫镇)
- Shijie (誓节镇)

Townships

- Lucun Township (卢村乡)
- Sihe Township (四合乡)
- Yangtan Township (杨滩乡)
- Dongting Township (东亭乡)

== Industry ==
Guangde provides the terrain for the 5.67-square-kilometer automobile proving ground (31.044266°N 119.425751°E) with 60 km (37 mi) of test roads, opened on September 22, 2012, and managed by Shanghai GM and the Pan Asia Technical Automotive Center (PATAC), both joint ventures of SAIC Motor with GM China.

== Climate ==
Climate data for Guangde, elevation 43 m (141 ft), (1991–2020 normals, extremes 1981–present)
| Month | Jan | Feb | Mar | Apr | May | Jun | Jul | Aug | Sep | Oct | Nov | Dec | Year |
|---|---|---|---|---|---|---|---|---|---|---|---|---|---|
| Record high °C (°F) | 23.3 (73.9) | 28.3 (82.9) | 35.4 (95.7) | 35.1 (95.2) | 36.7 (98.1) | 39.2 (102.6) | 39.5 (103.1) | 39.6 (103.3) | 38.3 (100.9) | 34.6 (94.3) | 29.6 (85.3) | 24.9 (76.8) | 39.6 (103.3) |
| Mean daily maximum °C (°F) | 7.9 (46.2) | 10.6 (51.1) | 15.5 (59.9) | 21.9 (71.4) | 26.7 (80.1) | 29.2 (84.6) | 33.2 (91.8) | 32.5 (90.5) | 28.2 (82.8) | 23.1 (73.6) | 17.1 (62.8) | 10.6 (51.1) | 21.4 (70.5) |
| Daily mean °C (°F) | 3.3 (37.9) | 5.7 (42.3) | 10.0 (50.0) | 16.0 (60.8) | 21.1 (70.0) | 24.5 (76.1) | 28.2 (82.8) | 27.6 (81.7) | 23.2 (73.8) | 17.6 (63.7) | 11.5 (52.7) | 5.4 (41.7) | 16.2 (61.1) |
| Mean daily minimum °C (°F) | 0.0 (32.0) | 2.0 (35.6) | 5.8 (42.4) | 11.1 (52.0) | 16.5 (61.7) | 20.9 (69.6) | 24.4 (75.9) | 24.1 (75.4) | 19.6 (67.3) | 13.5 (56.3) | 7.3 (45.1) | 1.6 (34.9) | 12.2 (54.0) |
| Record low °C (°F) | −12.4 (9.7) | −9.9 (14.2) | −4.0 (24.8) | 0.1 (32.2) | 5.7 (42.3) | 12.5 (54.5) | 17.9 (64.2) | 17.6 (63.7) | 9.2 (48.6) | 0.9 (33.6) | −5.5 (22.1) | −12.2 (10.0) | −12.4 (9.7) |
| Average precipitation mm (inches) | 82.8 (3.26) | 79.2 (3.12) | 119.3 (4.70) | 106.6 (4.20) | 121.9 (4.80) | 240.7 (9.48) | 201.6 (7.94) | 170.5 (6.71) | 98.4 (3.87) | 74.1 (2.92) | 66.5 (2.62) | 52.1 (2.05) | 1,413.7 (55.67) |
| Average precipitation days (≥ 0.1 mm) | 12.3 | 11.8 | 14.6 | 13.0 | 13.5 | 15.1 | 14.1 | 14.5 | 10.6 | 8.6 | 10.6 | 9.5 | 148.2 |
| Average snowy days | 3.8 | 2.4 | 0.8 | 0 | 0 | 0 | 0 | 0 | 0 | 0 | 0.3 | 1.3 | 8.6 |
| Average relative humidity (%) | 79 | 78 | 76 | 74 | 75 | 81 | 81 | 82 | 82 | 79 | 80 | 78 | 79 |
| Mean monthly sunshine hours | 106.9 | 107.7 | 128.5 | 152.2 | 165.2 | 133.8 | 192.8 | 183.5 | 147.0 | 153.2 | 133.7 | 124.7 | 1,729.2 |
| Percentage possible sunshine | 33 | 34 | 34 | 39 | 39 | 32 | 45 | 45 | 40 | 44 | 43 | 40 | 39 |
Source: China Meteorological Administrationall-time May low

== Transport ==
- China National Highway 318; Guangde Nan Highspeed Train station.

== Chinese space program ==
On July 19, 1964, China launched and recovered its first successful experimental biological rocket carrying eight white mice from the Chinese Academy of Sciences Base 603 launch site in Shijie Town (誓节镇) within the city.

== Culture ==
Prior to the late 19th century, most residents spoke a Jianghuai Mandarin dialect. Thereafter many people in the southern and eastern parts of the city began to speak Old Guangde dialect, a Taihu Wu Chinese dialect closely related to that of Suzhou dialect and Shanghainese. Most residents also speak the Southwestern Mandarin Guangde dialect.

== See also ==
- Chinese space program
