= Zhijin Cave =

Karst cave in Guizhou, China

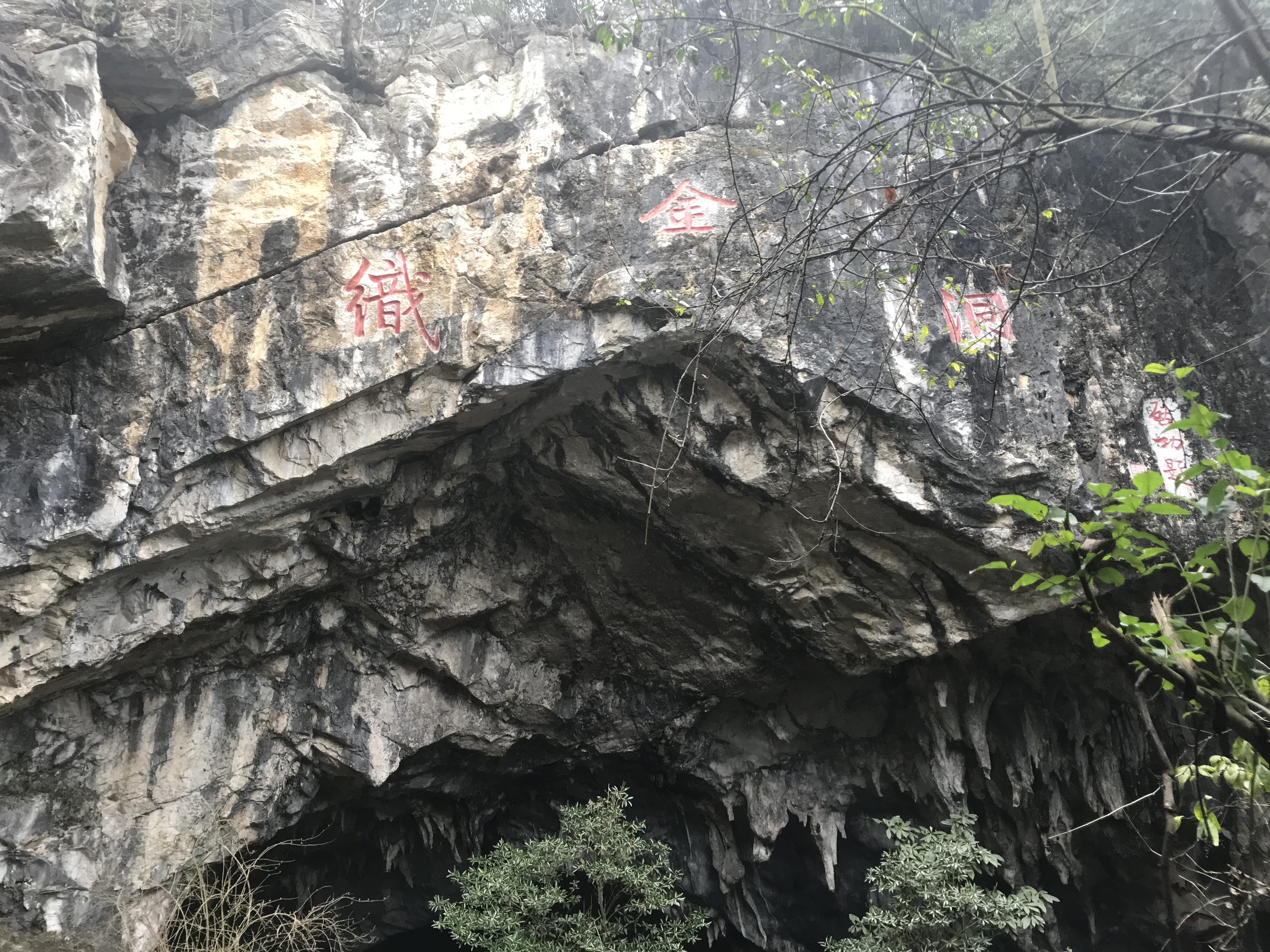
- Main Entrance of Zhijin Cave
- Interactive map of Zhijin Cave
- Coordinates: 26°45′30″N 105°55′51″E

Zhijin Cave (simplified Chinese: 织金洞; traditional Chinese: 織金洞; pinyin: Zhījīn Dòng; lit. 'Weaving Gold Cave') is a karst cave located in Minzhai Village (民寨乡), Zhijin County, Guizhou Province, People's Republic of China. An important tourism area, the site lies 23 km (14 mi) northeast of the county town and 166 km (103 mi) from the provincial capital, Guiyang.

== Description ==
Originally called the Daji Cave (打鸡洞), it was discovered in 1980 by the Zhijin County Tourism Resources Exploration Team. Split into three layers, the cave extends for some 13.5 km (8.4 mi) over a total area of 7 km^{2} (2.7 sq mi) and is believed to possess the largest unsupported roof span of any cave worldwide. More than 120 different crystalline formations are found in the cave's interior along with stalactites and the "Silver Rain Tree" (银雨树), a 17 m (56 ft) tall rare flower-like transparent crystal.

The surrounding area, known as the Guizhou Zhijin Cave Scenic Area (贵州织金洞风景区), was made a national level tourist site by the Chinese State Council in 1988. Other attractions here spread over an area of 307 km^{2} (119 sq mi) and includes Zhijin Old Town (织金古城区) as well as Luojie River Scenic Area (裸结河景区).

== Gallery ==
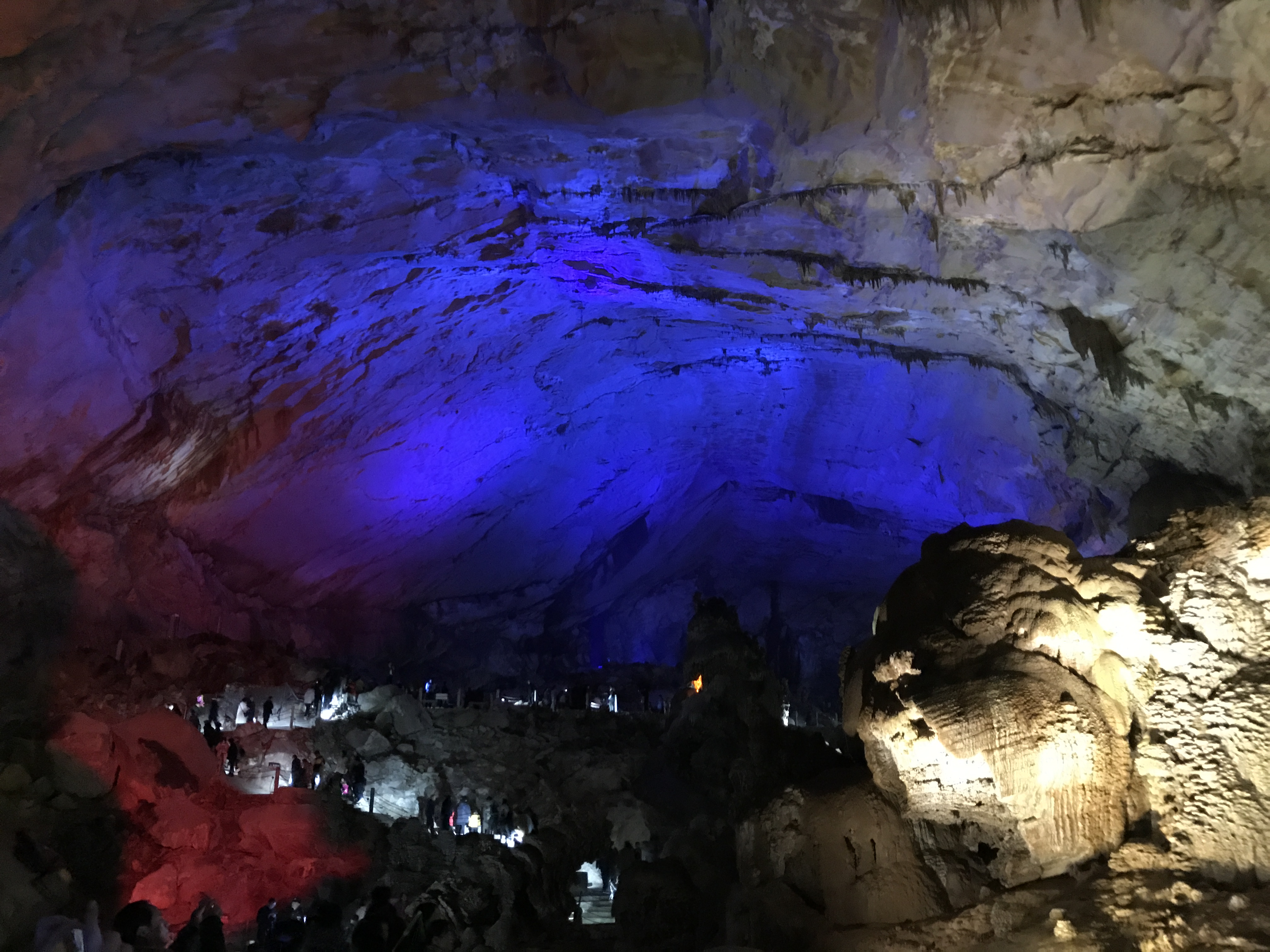
Looking forward towards the main hall of Zhijin Cave.

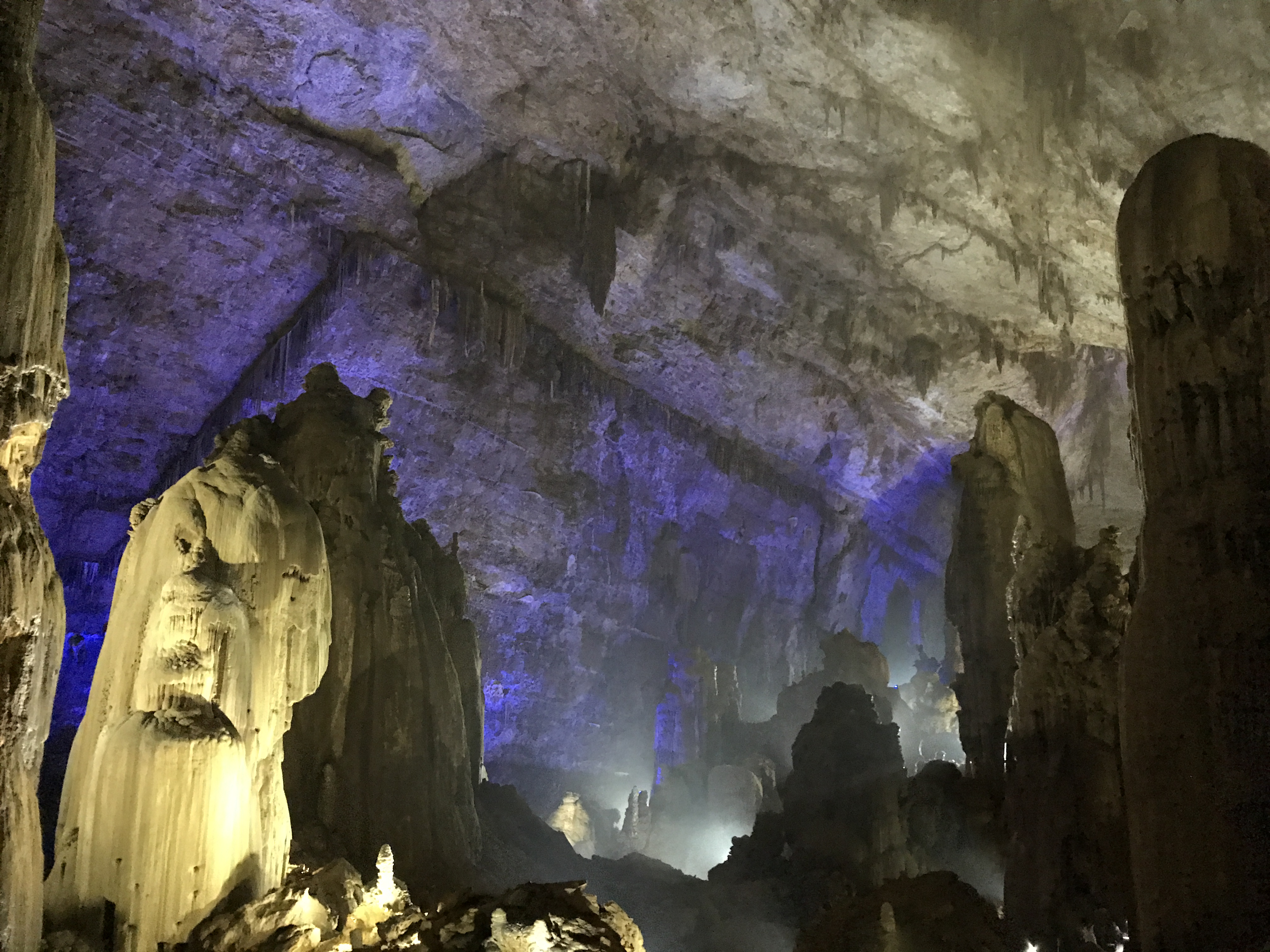
Looking back from near the exit. Here, the roof is up to 100 m (330 ft) high.

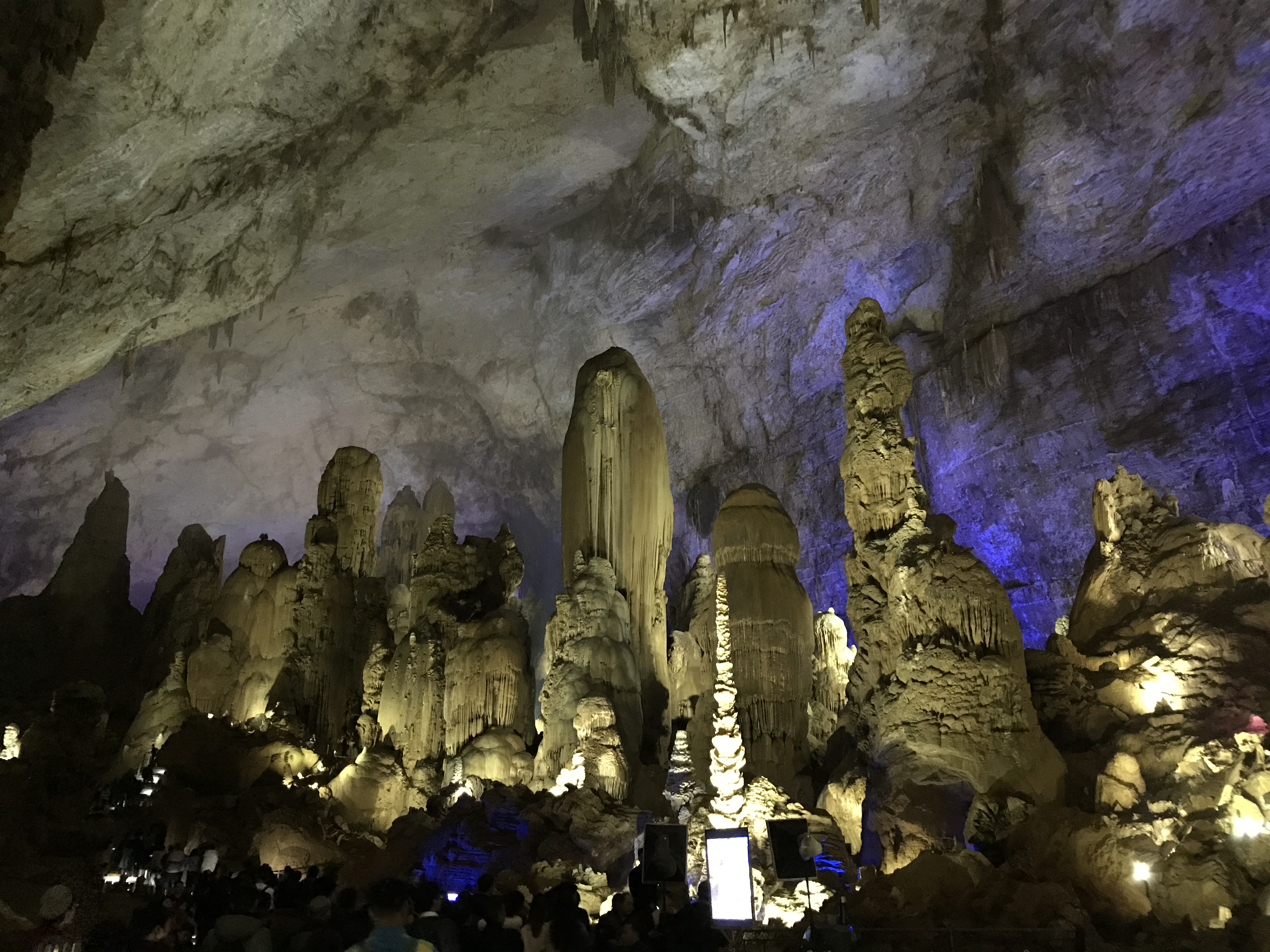
The "Silver Rain Tree" is the brightly lit formation in the foreground.

== See also ==
- List of UNESCO Global Geoparks in Asia
