= Taiji Cave =

Karst cave on Shilong Mountain, in China

- 太极洞
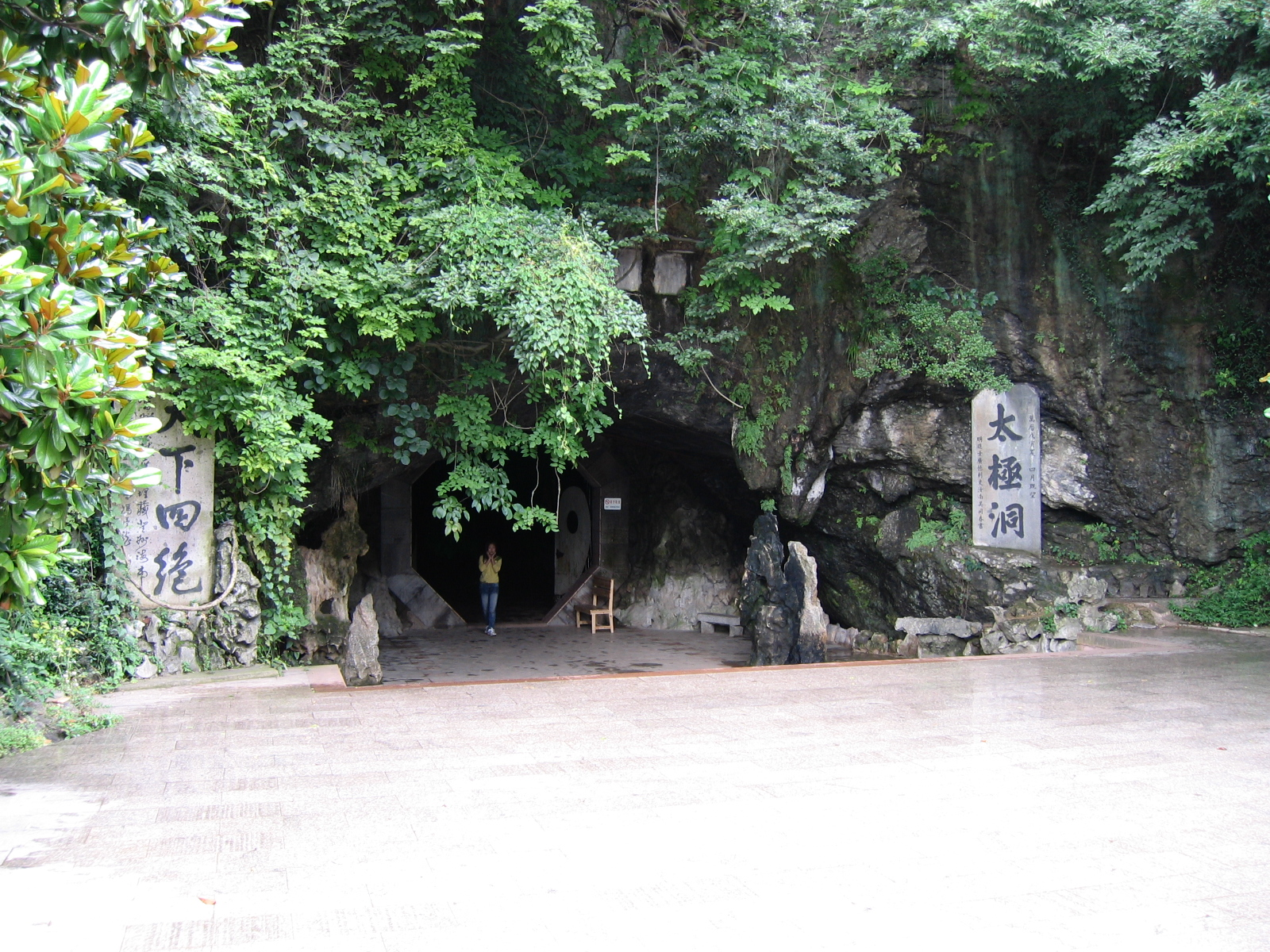
- Exterior of the Taiji Cave
- Interactive map of Taiji Cave
- Location: Guangde County, Xuancheng, Anhui
- Coordinates: 30°55′50″N 119°29′33″E
- Length: 5.4 km (3.4 mi)

Taiji Cave (simplified Chinese: 太极洞; traditional Chinese: 太極洞; pinyin: Tàijí Dòng; lit. 'Cave of the Supreme Ultimate') is a karst cave located on Shilong Mountain (石龙山) in Guangde County, Xuancheng City, Anhui Province, People's Republic of China, where the provinces of Jiangsu, Zhejiang and Anhui meet. Ming dynasty writer and poet Feng Menglong described the cave as one of the "Four Absolutes Under Heaven" (天下四绝 Tīanxià Sìjué). It is also considered a primary "Place of Enlightenment" (道教道场 Dàojiào Dàochǎng) by Taoists, similar to the Bodhimanda of Buddhism. The 200-million-year-old cave is divided into dry and wet layers representing the yin and yang of Chinese philosophy.

In February 2004, the Chinese State Council included the cave on its fifth list of National Scenic Attractions. It is also a 4A rated National Tourism Area.

== Overview ==
At 5.4 kilometres (3.4 mi) in length and covering a surface area of 140,000 m^{2} (1,500,000 sq ft), Taiji Cave is the largest natural limestone cave in East China. The cave's first chamber extends to 1,600 m^{2} (17,000 sq ft) and has a height of 5 to 10 metres (16 to 33 ft). To date nineteen separate chambers have been opened to visitors. There are more than 160 features inside the cave, including the "Ten Large Landscapes" (十大景观 Shí Dà Jǐngguān).

By boat it is possible to explore the water-filled level of the cave where there are many unusual rock formations.

== The "Ten Large Landscapes" ==
These interior features of the cave are largely based on their resemblance to other objects. Some are individual rock formations, whilst others are groups.

- Lord Laozi (太上老君 Tàishàng Lǎojūn)
- Dripping Water Penetrates Stone (滴水穿石 Dīshuĭ Chuānshí)
- Luxuriant Old Tree (槐荫古树 Huáiyìn Gŭshù)
- Capsized Boat of the Immortals (仙舟覆挂 Xiān Zhōu Fùguà)
- Twin Heavenly Towers (双塔凌霄 Shuāng Tǎ Língxiāo)
- Golden Dragon Coiled around Jade Pillar (金龙盘柱 Jīnlóng Pán Zhù)
- Yellow Mountain of the Cave (洞中黄山 Dòngzhōng Huángshān)
- Chamber of the Myriad Rock Formations (万象揽胜 Wànxiàng Lǎn Shèng)
- Mural of the Supreme Ultimate (太极壁画 Tàijí Bìhuà)
- Stalactite of Heaven's Eye (壶天极目 Hú Tiānjí Mù)

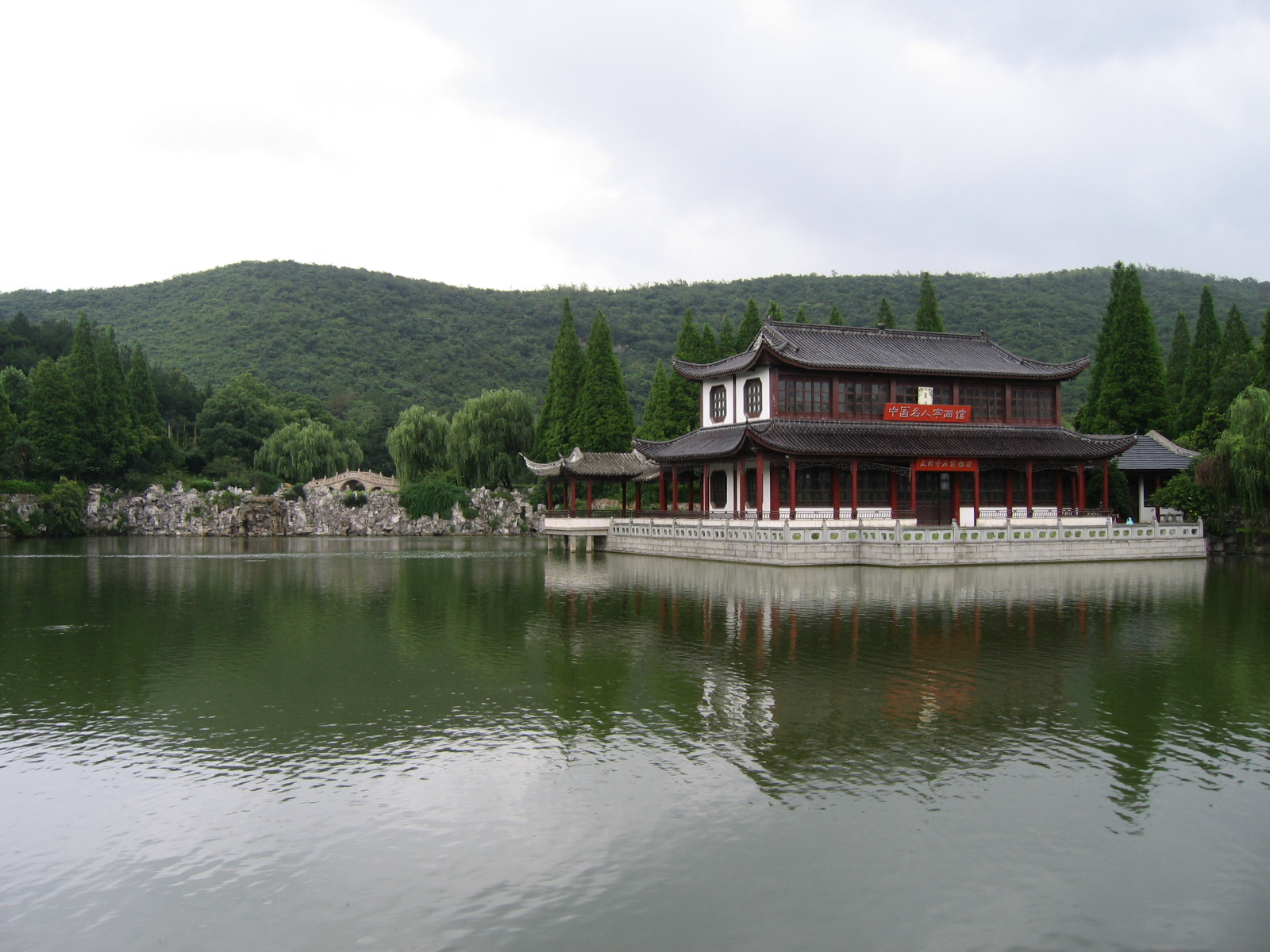
Landscape around the Taiji Cave

== Local places of interest ==
Dotted around the cave there are many places of historic interest including the "Hidden Dragon Bridge" (卧龙桥 Wòlóng Qiáo) where Emperor Guangwu (5 BCE–29 CE) took refuge during the Han dynasty, the military command platform (将军台 Jiāngjūn Tái) of General Lu Meng (178–220 CE) and the "Sabre Gorge Stone" (剑峡石) of Song dynasty patriot Yue Fei (1103–1142 CE). Outside the cave lies the Inkstone Lake (砚池湖 Yànchí Hú), said to be the location where Song dynasty politician and writer Fan Zhongyan washed his inkstone.
