= Shuangqiao District =

Shuangqiao District may refer to the following districts in China:

- Shuangqiao District, Chengde, a district in Chengde City, Hebei Province
- Shuangqiao District, Chongqing, a former district now merged into Dazu District of Chongqing Direct-Controlled Municipality, China
