= CACH =

CACH may refer to:

- China Academy of Cultural Heritage
- Chicago Area Consolidation Hub
