= Dazu Lotus Manor =

Lotus farm in Chongqing, China

Coordinates: 29.747°N 105.759°E

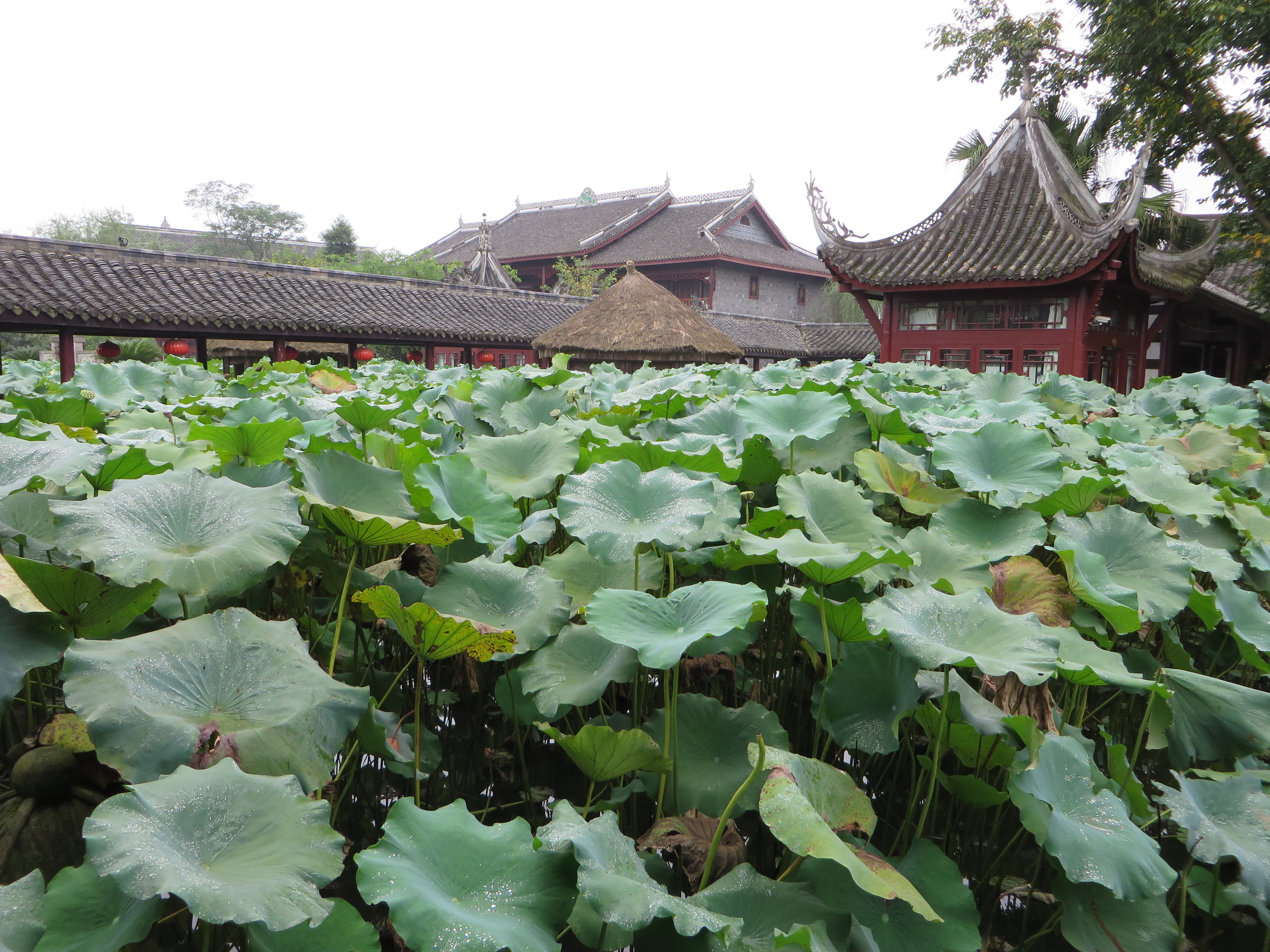
Lotus plants at Dazu Lotus Manor with traditional-style buildings in the background.

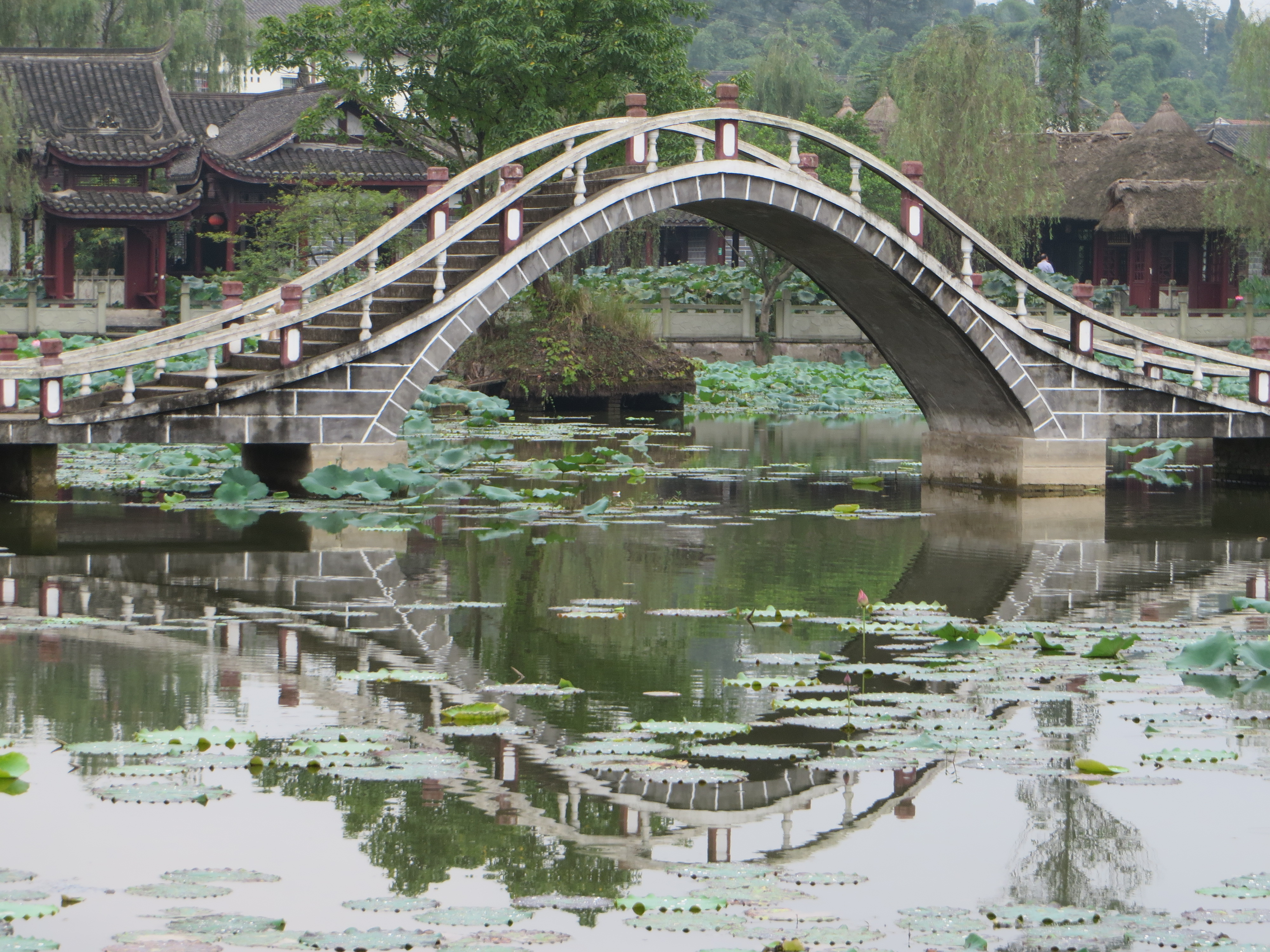
Bridge at Dazu Lotus Manor.

Dazu Lotus Manor (大足荷花山庄) is a lotus farm attraction in Dazu, Chongqing, China.

The attraction was established in 1992 and is owned by Luo Dengqiang. It covers 33 hectares and is located in Baoding Township, Dazu District. It is a holiday resort with floral plants on display, especially aquatic species, and other recreational facilities. The site included some reconstructed traditional buildings. It is close to the Dazu Rock Carvings World Heritage Site.

Seeds of lotus plants on the site have been taken into space, with mutations claimed as a result. 3,000 seeds were sent into space by the Beijing Space Satellite Application Company. Luo Dengqiang was the first Chinese individual to undertake such a space programme.

== See also ==
- Dazu Rock Carvings
