= China Academy of Cultural Heritage =

Archive organization in Beijing, China

- 中国文化遗产研究院
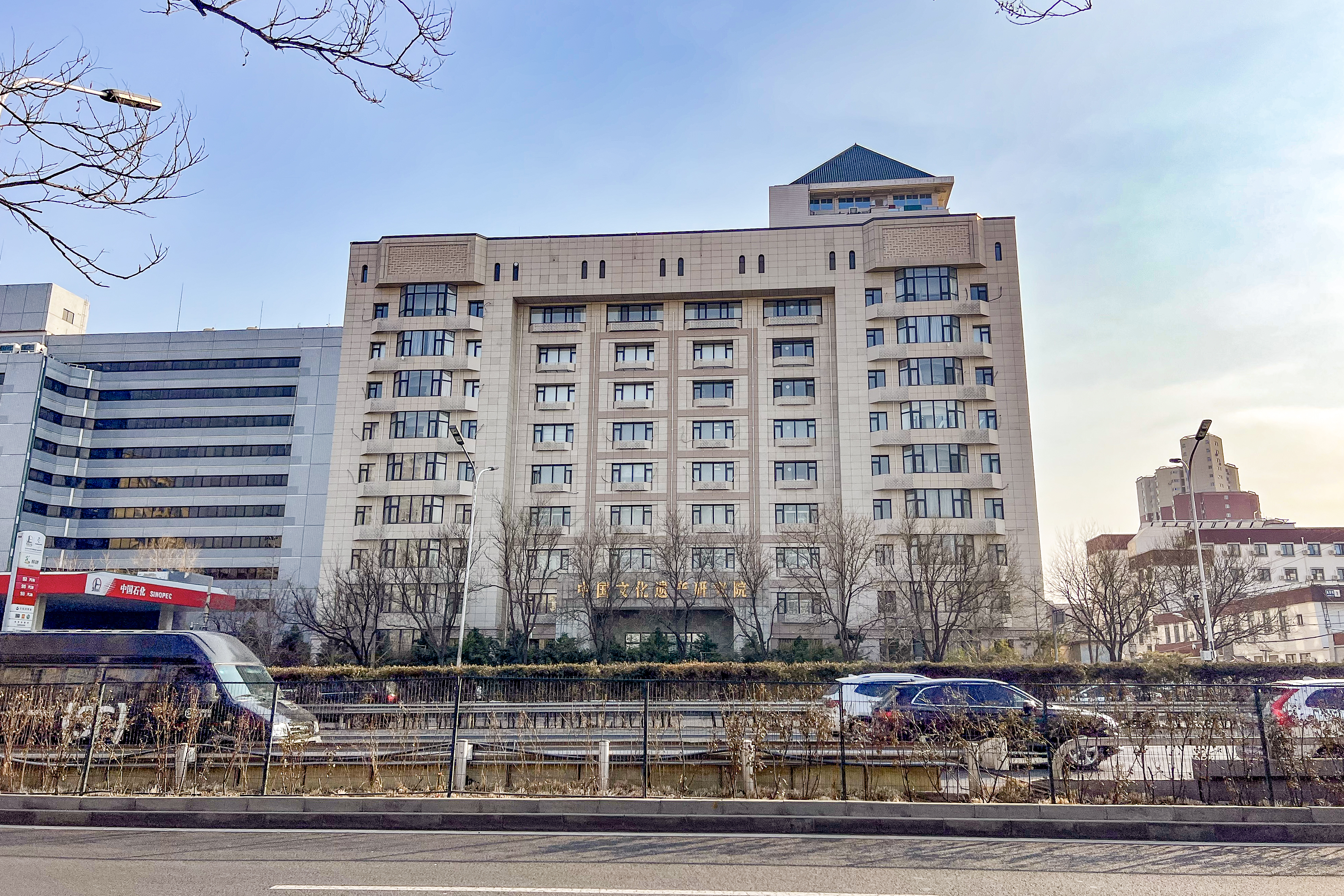
- Main building
- Formation: 1935; 91 years ago
- Type: Public institute
- Headquarters: 2 Gaoyuan Street, North Fourth Ring East Road, Chaoyang, Beijing, China
- Location: China
- Parent organization: National Cultural Heritage Administration
- Website: www.cach.org.cn

The China Academy of Cultural Heritage (CACH; Chinese: 中国文化遗产研究院) is a public institute dedicated to the protection, preservation, and restoration of cultural heritage. It operates under the direct leadership of the National Cultural Heritage Administration of China. The China Academy of Cultural Heritage is a scientific research organization in the People's Republic of China that focuses on cultural heritage protection. It is one of the leading professional forces in the country in this field.

== Main responsibilities ==
The main responsibilities of the China Academy of Cultural Heritage include cultural heritage research, conservation, restoration, and training.

== History ==
In 1935, under the Nationalist Government Executive Yuan in the Ping Political Organisation Committee, "the old capital of the cultural relics finishing committee" was formally established. In 1949, it was renamed the "Beijing Cultural Relics Restoration Committee" and was transferred to the Cultural Relics Bureau of the Ministry of Culture of the People's Republic of China. In 1973, it was renamed the "Institute of Cultural Relics Protection Science and Technology." In 1990, it merged with the Ancient Documents Research Office of the Ministry of Culture to become the "Institute of Cultural Relics of China." In August 2007, it was renamed "China Academy of Cultural Heritage.”

== Organisational setup ==
The China Academy of Cultural Heritage mainly consists of seven operational departments including the Institute of Cultural Relics, the Institute of Cultural Relics Conservation and Engineering, the China World Cultural Heritage Centre, the Institute of Cultural Relics Conservation and Restoration, the Institute of Education and Training, the Documentation and Research Office (Library), and the Editorial Office of the Chinese Cultural Heritage; three managerial departments and one safeguard department. There are three other affiliations, namely the Secretariat of the ICOMOS China National Committee, the Secretariat of the Committee for Standardization of Cultural Heritage Protection, and the Secretariat of the Steering Committee for Vocational Education and Teaching in the Cultural Heritage Protection Sector.

== Research conditions ==
Scientific research directions include heritage protection science, technology, and other related disciplines. In the People's Republic of China, qualifications in archaeological excavation and other related cultural relics protection are required. The laboratory space is approximately 1,600 square meters and contains 211 instruments and pieces of equipment.

As of 2014, the hospital had 140 staff members, including 70 with senior professional and technical qualifications. Three of these staff members have been honored by foreign governments with the Prince Claus Award of the Netherlands. December 2022, Cambodia's Deputy Prime Minister and Minister of Parliamentary Liaison and Supervision, Mae Seng Anh, 16, for the protection of Angkor monuments have made outstanding contributions to the representatives of various countries to award medals, from the China Academy of Cultural Heritage, Jin Zhaoyu, Yuan Mengxie was awarded the Knight of the Order of the Kingdom of Cambodia.

== Conservation and scientific research results ==
=== National Cultural Heritage Protection Project ===
The China Academy of Cultural Heritage has presided over or participated in more than 1,000 scientific research projects at all levels, including more than 30 major state-level special projects, and has completed more than 100 major cultural relics protection and restoration projects. For example:

Cultural Heritage Protection Project	Time of implementation
Renovation of Longxing Temple in Zhengding, Hebei	1953-1955
Beijing Ming tombs protection, maintenance and reconstruction project	1985-1992
Shanxi Yungang Grottoes Protection Project	1974-1998
Tibet Potala Palace Maintenance and Protection Project	(One: 1989-1994 Two: 2002-2007)

=== Technical studies ===
It has undertaken and completed more than 500 national heritage conservation projects (including more than 100 major projects). For example:

Project Level	Project	Implementation time
National Science and Technology Support Project	Integrated Protection Technology Research for Iron Cultural Relics（铁质文物综合保护技术研究）	2006-2009
National Science and Technology Support Project	Research on the Application of Spatial Information Technology in the Conservation of Large Archaeological Sites: A Case Study of the Grand Canal (Beijing-Hangzhou)	2007-2008
Other projects at the national level	Key Technologies Research on Conservation and Restoration of Gilded and Caihua Stone Carvings in Southern China—A Case Study of the Emergency Conservation of the Thousand-Armed Guanyin Statue at Dazu Rock Carvings	2008-2010
Other projects at the national level	Protection and Research of Excavated Documents in Xinjiang	2009-2010
Subjects of the State Administration of Cultural Heritage	A Study on the Requirements of the First Phase of the Grand Canal Heritage Conservation Plan	2008
The National Cultural Heritage Administration commissioned project	Feasibility Study on Establishing an International Standardization Organization Committee for Cultural Heritage Protection Technology	2008-2009
The National Cultural Heritage Administration commissioned project	Research on the Conservation Status of the Thousand-Armed Guanyin Statue at Dazu Rock Carvings in Chongqing	2007-2008
Research topic in other fields	Study on the Conservation and Restoration History of Ta Keo Temple in Angkor, Cambodia	2010-2011
Research topic in other fields	Collection, Compilation, and Preliminary Research on Archaeological Materials Related to Cultural Relics in the South China Sea Islands	2010-2011

=== Academic works ===
==== Monographs on engineering and scientific and technological conservation ====
- Techniques for the Protection and Restoration of Chinese Cultural Relics《中国文物保护修复技术》
- World Heritage: Angkor Monuments in Cambodia - Chau Say Tevoda Temple《世界遗产•柬埔寨吴哥古迹•周萨神庙》
- Ancient Chinese Architecture: Dule Temple in Jixian《中国古代建筑——蓟县独乐寺》

==== Monographs on groundwork ====
- Catalogue of Local Chronicles Held by the China Academy of Cultural Heritage《中国文化遗产研究院藏地方志书目》
- Epitaphs Unearthed in New China《新中国出土墓志》
- Wu Jian of the Three Kingdoms, Changsha. Bamboo Slip《长沙走马楼三国吴简.竹简》

=== Periodicals ===
Journals sponsored by the China Academy of Cultural Heritage are:

- Annual magazine launched in 1985《出土文献研究》
- Annual magazine launched in 2003《文物科技研究》
- Quarterly magazine launched in 2006《中国文物科学研究》(Co-sponsored with the Chinese Society of Cultural Heritage)

== Cooperating Partners ==
The China Academy of Cultural Heritage (CACH) has initiated scientific cooperation with many renowned research institutes, universities, and local governments worldwide. In 2009, we successively conducted cooperation and exchanges with relevant institutions in the United States, the United Kingdom, France, Germany, Switzerland, Malaysia, Israel, Spain, Italy, the Czech Republic, Cambodia, South Korea, Japan, India, Taiwan, and other countries. In 2009, 40 scientific researchers at the institute participated in international conferences and went abroad for training.

Socially, cooperation framework agreements have been signed with organizations, institutions, and local governments such as the Beijing Fangshan Yunju Temple Cultural Relics Management Office, Dazu Rock Carving Research Institute, Inner Mongolia Autonomous Region Cultural Relics Bureau, Jinggangshan Administration Bureau, and Lancang County People's Government.
