= Dazu, Chongqing =

Dazu 大足区
- District
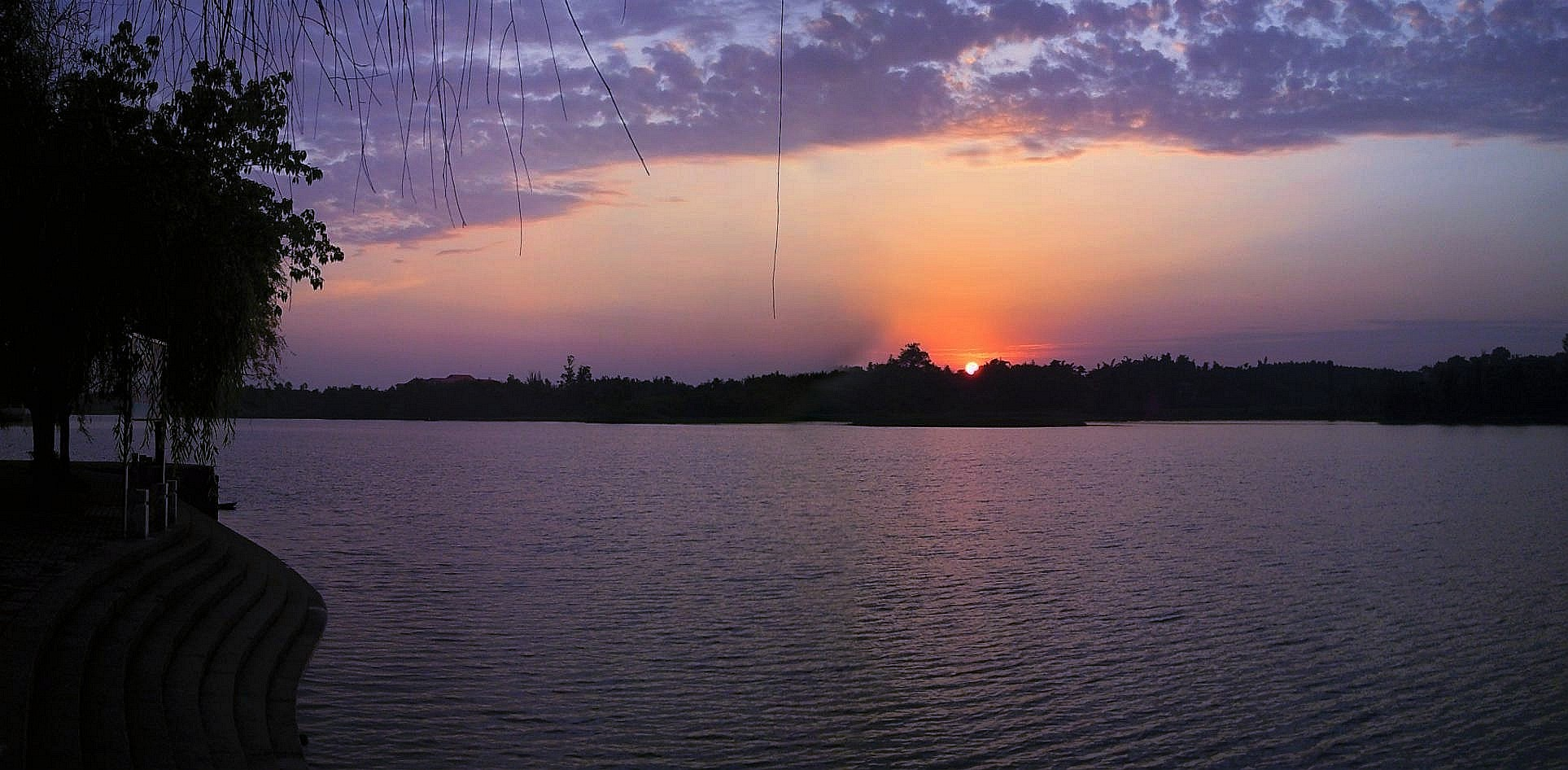
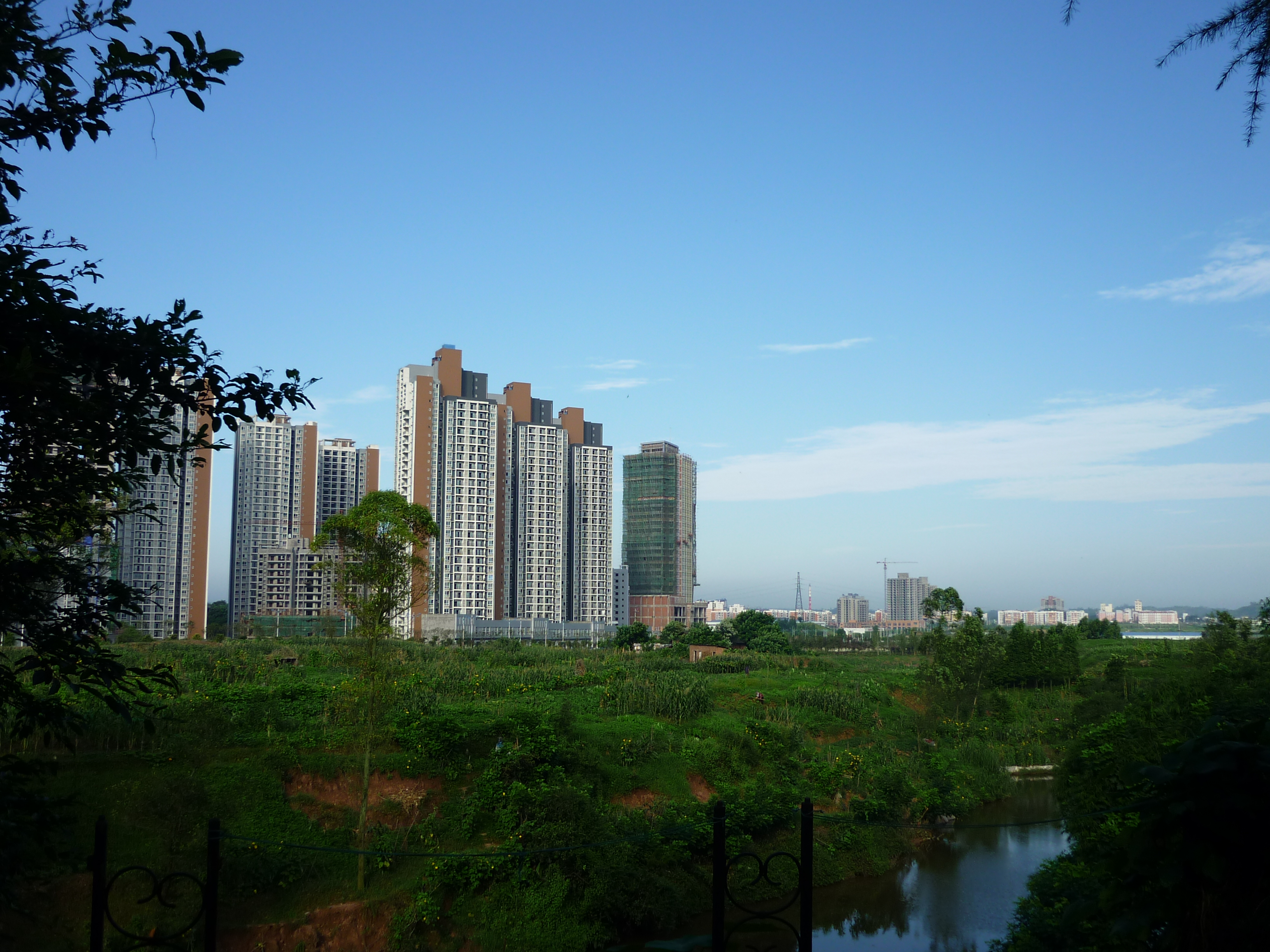
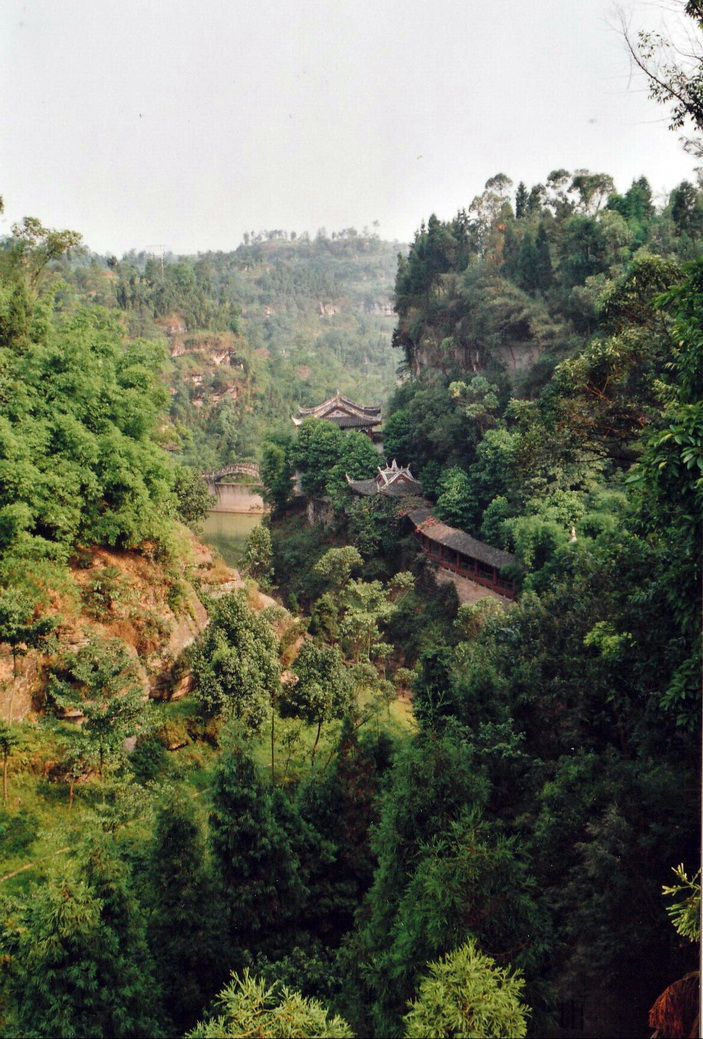
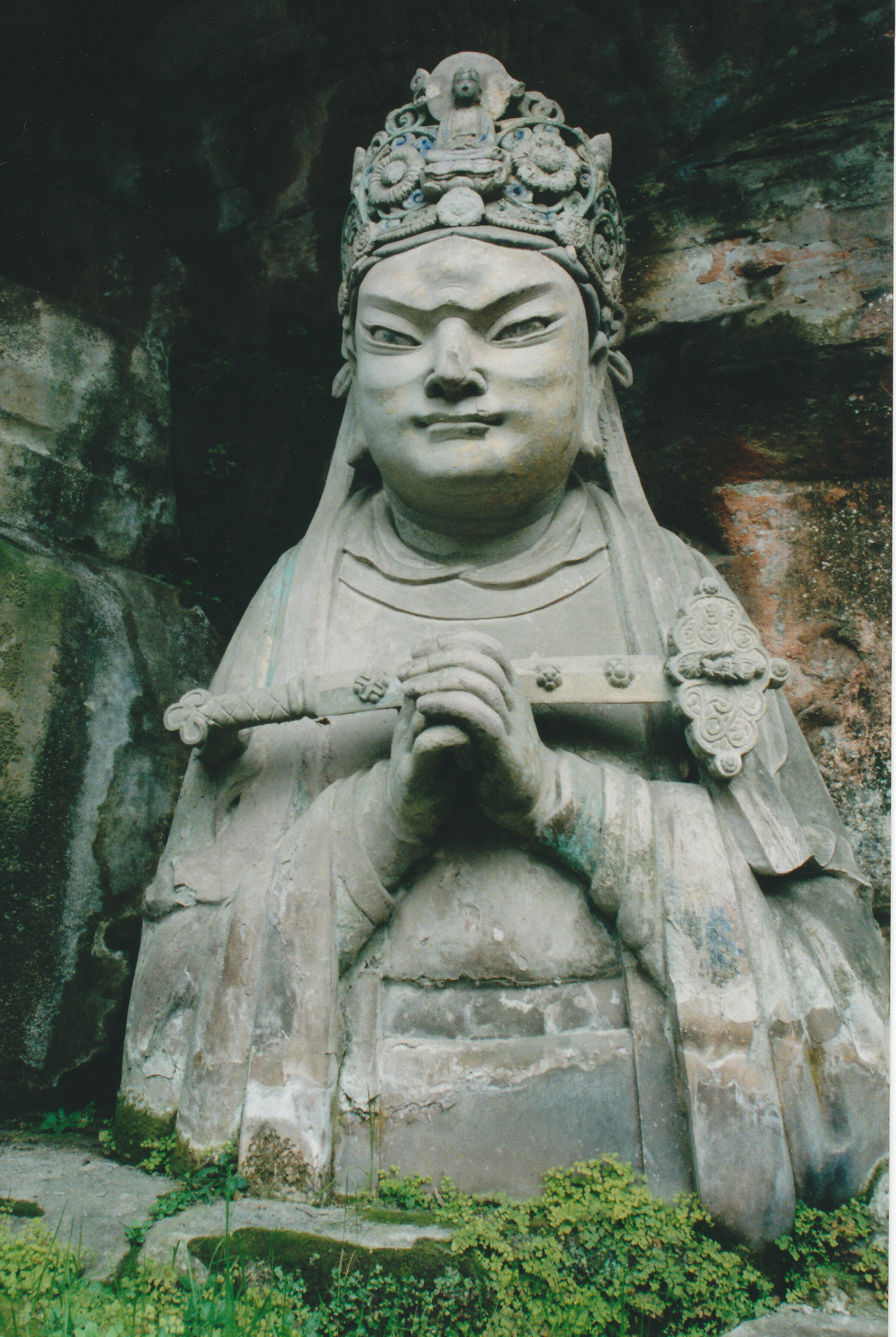
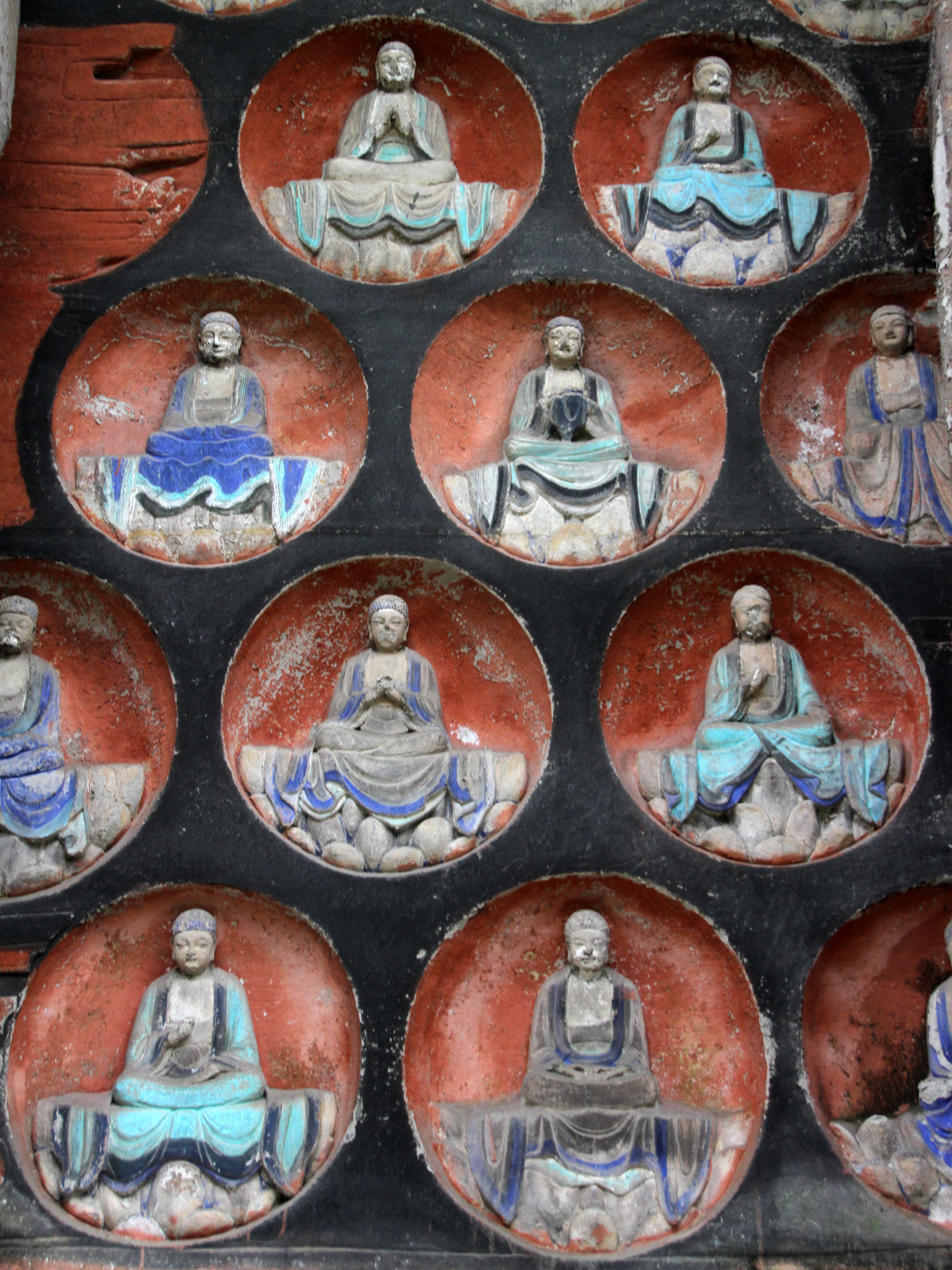
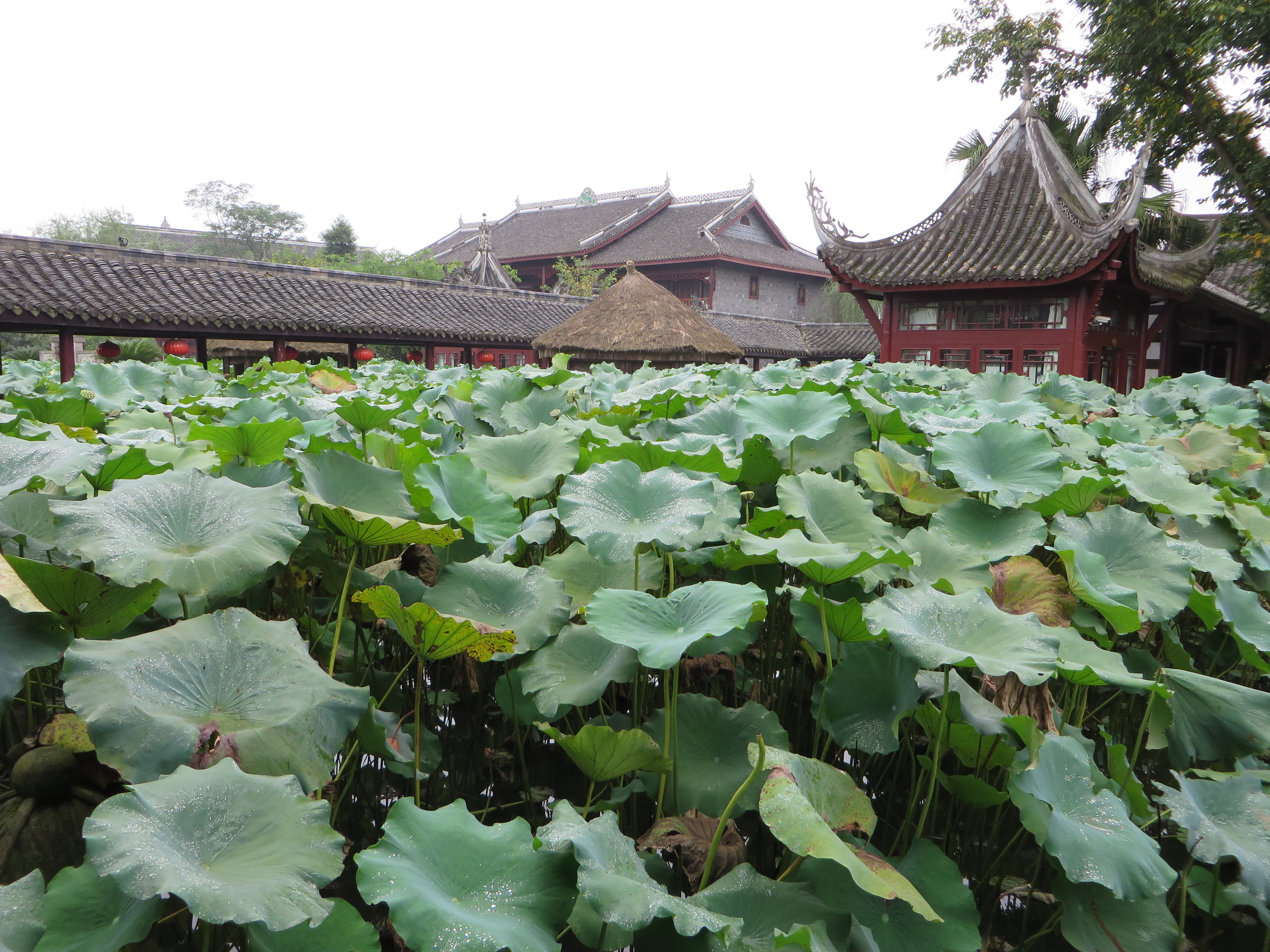
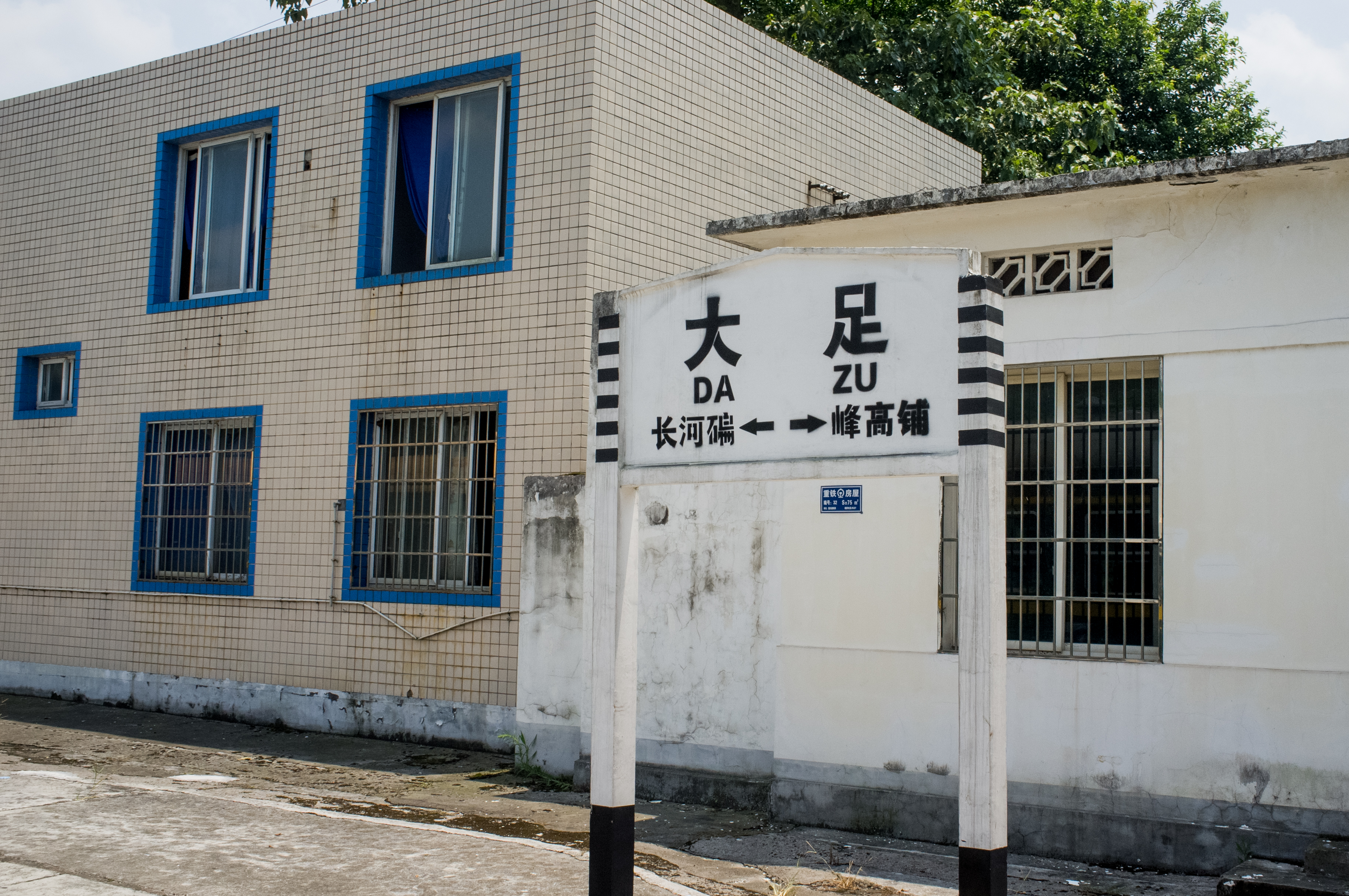
- Longshui Lake Dazu City Baodingshan Dazu Grottoes Dazu Rock Carvings Lotus Manor Dazu Station

- Dazu in Chongqing
- Interactive map of Dazu
- Coordinates: 29°42′N 105°43′E
- Country: People's Republic of China
- Municipality: Chongqing

Area
  - Total: 1,433 km^{2} (553 sq mi)

Population (2020 census)
  - Total: 834,592
  - Density: 582.4/km^{2} (1,508/sq mi)
- Time zone: UTC+8 (China Standard)
- Division code: DZX

Dazu District (Chinese: 大足区; pinyin: Dàzú Qū) is a district of Chongqing, China, bordering Sichuan province to the northwest. It is where the famous Dazu Rock Carvings, a UNESCO World Heritage Site, is located. Dazu Lotus Manor is a tourist attraction with many lotus plants, some bred from seeds sent to space.

== History ==
In the late 19th century, Dazu was the site of major violence led by the Elder Brothers Society against local Catholic Christians who were accused of controlling the local coal market, and resented for the large church built between two major temples devoted to Lingguan on the main market square. This church was destroyed multiple times in the 1880s and 1890s. The violence displaced thousands of people, with one incident, in 1890 leading to the deaths of 12 Christians who refused to bow to statues of Lingguan.

In October 2011, Dazu County and Shuangqiao District were merged to form the new Dazu District.

== Transport ==
- Dazushike railway station on Chengdu-Chongqing Central line high-speed railway is currently under construction

== Administrative divisions ==
Name	Chinese (S)	Hanyu Pinyin	Population (2010)	Area (km^{2})
Longgang Subdistrict	龙岗街道	Lónggǎng Jiēdào	74,605	43.83
Tangxiang Subdistrict	棠香街道	Tángxiāng Jiēdào	66,325	60.2
Longtanzi Subdistrict	龙滩子街道	Lóngtānzi Jiēdào	13,258	
Longshui town	龙水镇	Lóngshuǐ Zhèn	121,609	81
Zhifeng town	智凤镇	Zhìfèng Zhèn	28,467	67.17
Baoding town	宝顶镇	Bǎodǐng Zhèn	17,591	63.78
Zhong'ao town	中敖镇	Zhōng'áo Zhèn	31,118	113.62
Sanqu town	三驱镇	Sānqū Zhèn	28,563	76
Baoxing town	宝兴镇	Bǎoxìng Zhèn	18,963	51.49
Yulong town	玉龙镇	Yùlóng Zhèn	16,072	51.07
Shima town	石马镇	Shímǎ Zhèn	22,820	51.6
Shiwan town	拾万镇	Shíwàn Zhèn	16,103	49
Huilong town	回龙镇	Huílóng Zhèn	12,974	49
Jinshan town	金山镇	Jīnshān Zhèn	11,034	38
Wangu town	万古镇	Wàngǔ Zhèn	28,871	66.5
Guoliang Town	国梁镇	Guóliáng Zhèn	11,392	38.97
Yongxi Town	雍溪镇	Yōngxī Zhèn	15,213	39.92
Zhuxi town	珠溪镇	Zhūxī Zhèn	34,113	83
Longshi town	龙石镇	Lóngshí Zhèn	10,477	31.4
Youting town	邮亭镇	Yóutíng Zhèn	44,363	107
Tieshan town	铁山镇	Tiěshān Zhèn	15,669	59.97
Gaosheng town	高升镇	Gāoshēng Zhèn	13,995	48
Jijia town	季家镇	Jìjiā Zhèn	10,941	53.6
Gulong town	古龙镇	Gǔlóng Zhèn	6,442	18
Gaoping town	高坪镇	Gāopíng Zhèn	13,523	46
Shuanglu town	双路镇	Shuānglù Zhèn	26,582	
Tongqiao town	通桥镇	Tōngqiáo Zhèn	10,276	18.5

== Climate ==
Climate data for Dazu, elevation 395 m (1,296 ft), (1991–2020 normals, extremes 1981–2010)
Month	Jan	Feb	Mar	Apr	May	Jun	Jul	Aug	Sep	Oct	Nov	Dec	Year
Record high °C (°F)	17.8 (64.0)	23.7 (74.7)	32.3 (90.1)	34.0 (93.2)	36.7 (98.1)	36.5 (97.7)	38.8 (101.8)	41.9 (107.4)	40.6 (105.1)	33.7 (92.7)	26.0 (78.8)	18.2 (64.8)	41.9 (107.4)
Mean daily maximum °C (°F)	9.5 (49.1)	12.7 (54.9)	17.6 (63.7)	23.0 (73.4)	26.5 (79.7)	28.6 (83.5)	32.1 (89.8)	32.2 (90.0)	27.1 (80.8)	21.1 (70.0)	16.4 (61.5)	10.8 (51.4)	21.5 (70.6)
Daily mean °C (°F)	6.5 (43.7)	9.0 (48.2)	13.0 (55.4)	17.9 (64.2)	21.4 (70.5)	24.0 (75.2)	27.0 (80.6)	26.6 (79.9)	22.6 (72.7)	17.5 (63.5)	13.0 (55.4)	8.0 (46.4)	17.2 (63.0)
Mean daily minimum °C (°F)	4.3 (39.7)	6.4 (43.5)	9.7 (49.5)	14.2 (57.6)	17.8 (64.0)	20.8 (69.4)	23.3 (73.9)	22.8 (73.0)	19.7 (67.5)	15.3 (59.5)	10.7 (51.3)	6.0 (42.8)	14.2 (57.6)
Record low °C (°F)	−2.9 (26.8)	−1.2 (29.8)	0.6 (33.1)	5.3 (41.5)	8.5 (47.3)	13.6 (56.5)	16.6 (61.9)	17.1 (62.8)	13.2 (55.8)	5.4 (41.7)	0.1 (32.2)	−2.7 (27.1)	−2.9 (26.8)
Average precipitation mm (inches)	15.3 (0.60)	19.4 (0.76)	39.3 (1.55)	78.0 (3.07)	112.2 (4.42)	183.1 (7.21)	170.5 (6.71)	154.0 (6.06)	107.6 (4.24)	83.6 (3.29)	35.0 (1.38)	17.2 (0.68)	1,015.2 (39.97)
Average precipitation days (≥ 0.1 mm)	10.6	9.6	10.7	13.6	15.1	16.1	12.6	12.8	14.1	17.0	11.1	10.0	28.2
Average snowy days	0.6	0.3	0	0	0	0	0	0	0	0	0	0.3	1.2
Average relative humidity (%)	86	82	79	79	79	84	81	80	84	88	87	87	83
Mean monthly sunshine hours	28.2	37.8	74.1	99.1	106.8	92.4	154.7	152.5	89.8	47.0	44.1	25.8	952.3
Percentage possible sunshine	9	12	20	26	25	22	36	38	25	13	14	8	21
Source: China Meteorological Administration

== Demographics ==
According to the Seventh National Census in 2020, the city's Permanent Population was 834,592. Compared with 721,359 people in the Sixth National Census in 2010, an increase of 113,233 people, an increase of 15.70%, an average annual growth rate of 1.47%, and an average birth rate of 8.063% in the next ten years.The male resident population was 424206, accounting for 50.83%; The female resident population was 410,386, accounting for 49.17%. The sex ratio of the total resident population (100 females, male to female ratio) was 103.37, which was 0.23 lower than that of the sixth national census in 2010, and the male to female ratio gradually reached an equilibrium level.
