= Tieshan, Chongqing =

Tieshan 铁山镇
- Town
- Location in Chongqing
- Coordinates: 29°41′26″N 105°30′12″E
- Country: People's Republic of China
- Direct-administered municipality: Chongqing
- District: Dazu District
- Time zone: UTC+8 (China Standard)

Tieshan (simplified Chinese: 铁山; traditional Chinese: 鐵山; pinyin: Tiěshān) is a town in Dazu District, Chongqing province, China. As of 2020, it administers the following two residential communities and twelve villages:

- Shuanghe Street Community (双河街社区)
- Jinyuan Street Community (晋元街社区)
- Shuangqiao Village (双桥村)
- Youfang Village (油坊村)
- Lianke Village (连科村)
- Xibei Village (西北村)
- Jiguang Village (继光村)
- Qilin Village (麒麟村)
- Duobao Village (多宝村)
- Gaolong Village (高龙村)
- Jianjiao Village (建角村)
- Guixiang Village (桂香村)
- Sanzhai Village (三寨村)
- Shengfeng Village (胜丰村)

== See also ==
- List of township-level divisions of Chongqing
