= Shuangqiao, Chongqing =

Coordinates: 29.4925°N 105.78°E

Shuangqiao District 双桥区
- District
- Shuangqiao District in Chongqing
- Country: People's Republic of China
- Region: Chongqing
- Time zone: UTC+8 (China Standard)

Shuangqiao District (simplified Chinese: 双桥区; traditional Chinese: 雙橋區; pinyin: Shuāngqiáo Qū) is a former district of Chongqing, China.

In October 2011, Shuangqiao was merged into Dazu County to form the new Dazu District.
