= Lingguan =

Dream of the Red Chamber character

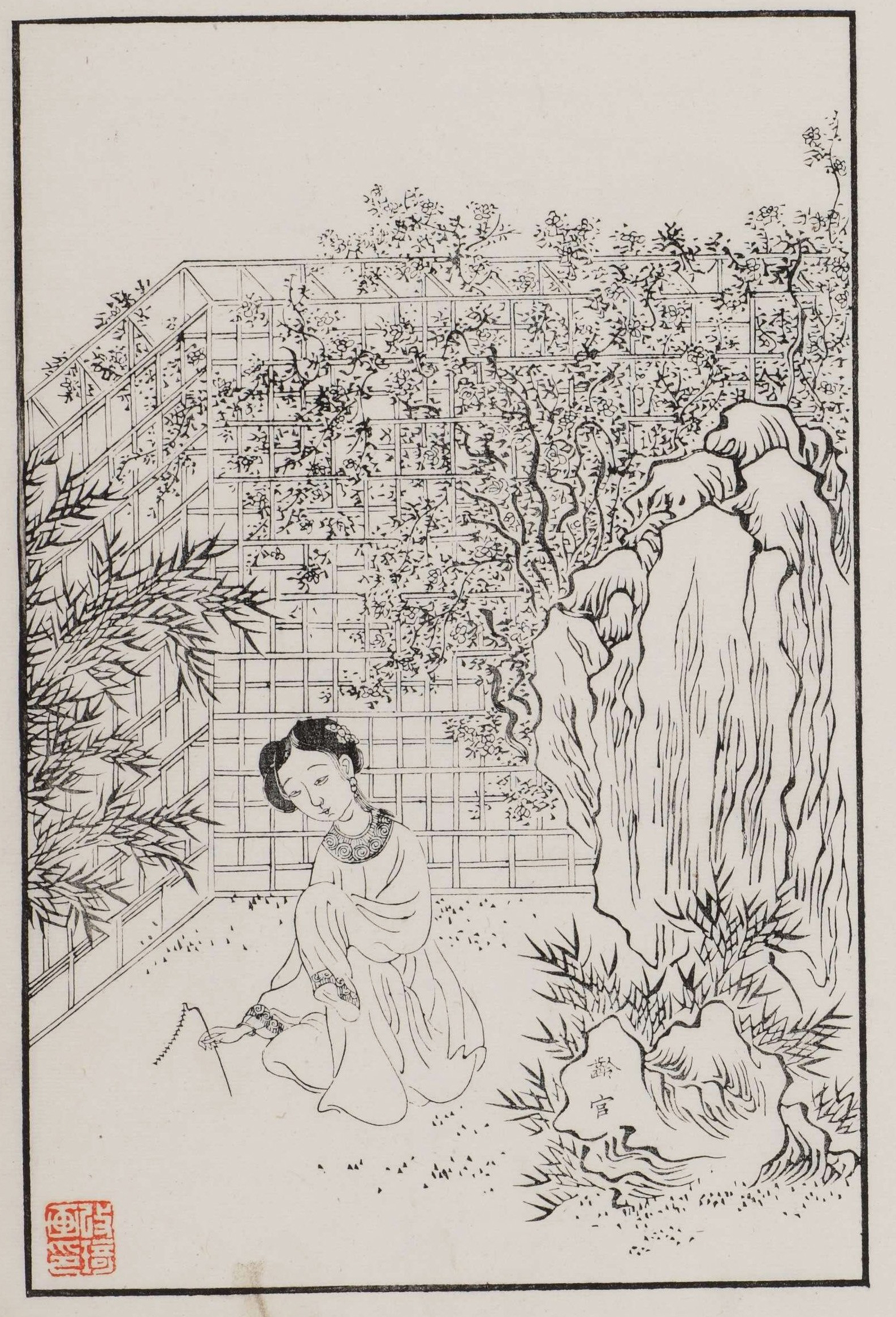
Lingguan, illustrated by Gai Qi.

Lingguan (Chinese: 齡官, rendered Charmante in David Hawkes' translation) is the stage name of a fictional Chinese opera actress from the Chinese novel Dream of the Red Chamber. She is one of the most strong-willed characters in the novel. Critics consider both Lingguan and Qingwen as doubles of Lin Daiyu.

Described as beautiful and graceful, Lingguan is also the best singer in the 12-girl troupe belonging to the Jia household. She is only about ten years old and specializes in xiaodan roles. She makes her first appearance in Chapter 18, when she refuses Jia Yuanchun's request to perform two arias from A Thorn Hairpin: she performs arias from The Peony Pavilion instead. Later, Jia Baoyu notices the love she has for Jia Qiang which impresses him.

Lingguan leaves the Jia household once the theatrical group is disbanded. Her fate after that is unknown.
