= Dazu Rock Carvings =

UNESCO World Heritage Site
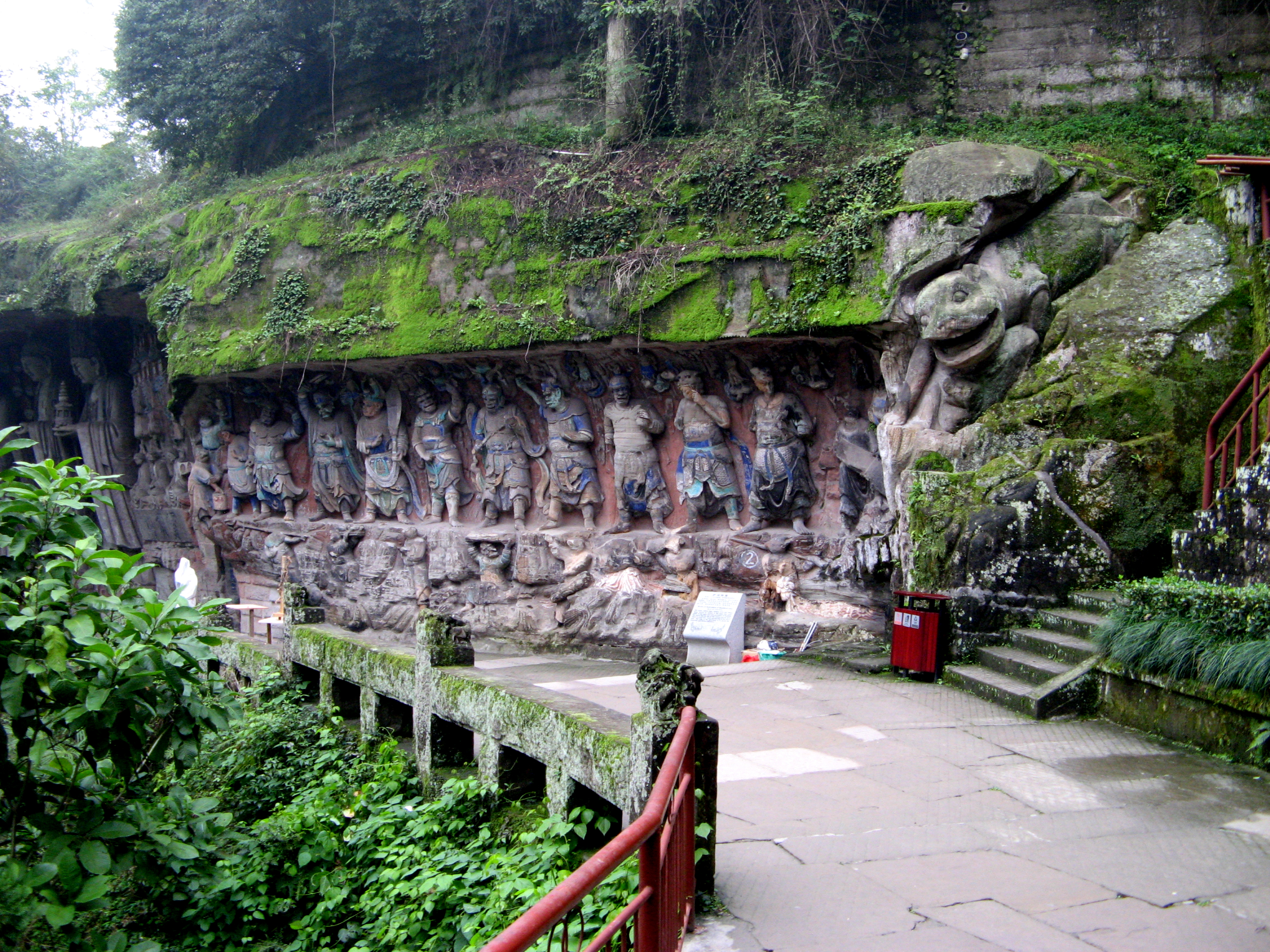
- Dazu Rock Carvings on Mount Baoding

- Location within Chongqing Location within China
- Location: Dazu District, Chongqing, China
- Includes: 1. Beishan; 2. Baodingshan; 3. Nanshan; 4. Shizhuanshan; 5. Shimenshan
- Criteria: Cultural: (i), (ii), (iii)
- Reference: 912
- Inscription: 1999 (23rd Session)
- Area: 20.41 ha (0.0788 sq mi)
- Buffer zone: 211.12 ha (0.8151 sq mi)
- Coordinates: 29°42′4″N 105°42′18″E

The Dazu Rock Carvings (Chinese: 大足石刻; pinyin: Dàzú Shíkè) are a series of Chinese religious sculptures and carvings and UNESCO World Heritage Site located in Dazu District, Chongqing, China. The carvings date back as far as the 7th century AD, depicting and influenced by Buddhist, Confucian and Taoist beliefs. Some are in rock-cut cave shrines, in the usual Chinese Buddhist style, but many others are rock reliefs carved into the open rock faces. Listed as a World Heritage Site in 1999, the Dazu Rock Carvings are made up of 75 protected sites containing some 50,000 statues, with over 100,000 Chinese characters forming inscriptions and epigraphs. The sites are located in Chongqing Municipality within the steep hillsides throughout Dazu District, located about 165 kilometers west of the urban area of Chongqing. The highlights of the rock grotto are found on Mount Baoding and Mount Beishan.

== Description ==
The Dazu Rock Carvings comprise 5 locations in Dazu District, Chongqing Municipality: Beishan, Baodingshan, Nanshan, Shizhuanshan, and Shimenshan.

- Beishan (North Mountain) contains two groups of rock carvings and sculptures along a cliff face stretching for 300 meters. These date from the 9th to the 12th century and portray Tantric Buddhist and Taoist themes.
- Baodingshan (Baoding Mountain) includes carvings in a U-shaped valley near the Longevity Pavilion, dating from the 12th and 13th centuries. Stretching for 500 meters, the carved figures depict themes from Tantric Buddhism in addition to secular life.
- At Nanshan (South Mountain), the rock art dates from the Song Dynasty during the Shaoxing era, depicting Taoist themes and symbols. In addition, there is a stele recording the history of Sichuan after a Mongol invasion in the 13th century.
- Shizhuanshan (Shizhuan Mountain) carvings are dated from the early 12th century, uniquely integrating rock-hewn sculptures and carvings depicting Taoism, Confucianism, and Buddhism together. The most prominent of the grotto sculptures are thought to have been sculpted by Wen Wijian, a famous sculptor of the time.
- Shimenshan (Shimen Mountain) contains carvings that date from the 12th century, including statues of the Jade Emperor and several gods.

== History ==
The technique for rock carvings may have originated in ancient India. The earliest carvings were begun in 650 AD during the early Tang dynasty, but the main period of their creation began in the late 9th century, when Wei Junjing, Prefect of Changzhou, pioneered the carvings on Mount Beishan, and his example was followed after the collapse of the Tang dynasty by local and gentry, monks and nuns, and ordinary people during the Five Dynasties and Ten Kingdoms period (907–65). In the 12th century, during the Song dynasty, a Buddhist monk named Zhao Zhifeng began work on the elaborate sculptures and carvings on Mount Baoding, dedicating 70 years of his life to the project. Unlike most collections of rock carvings, the Dazu rock carvings include statues representing all three major religions: Buddhism, Taoism, and Confucianism.

Off limits to visitors for many years, the carvings were opened to Chinese travelers in 1961 and foreign visitors in 1980. Until 1975, there was only a muddy path between the town of Dazu and the main cluster of carvings.

The carvings were listed as a World Heritage Site in 1999, citing "…their aesthetic quality, their rich diversity of subject matter, both secular and religious, and the light that they shed on everyday life in China during this period. They provide outstanding evidence of the harmonious synthesis of Buddhism, Taoism and Confucianism."

== Panorama ==
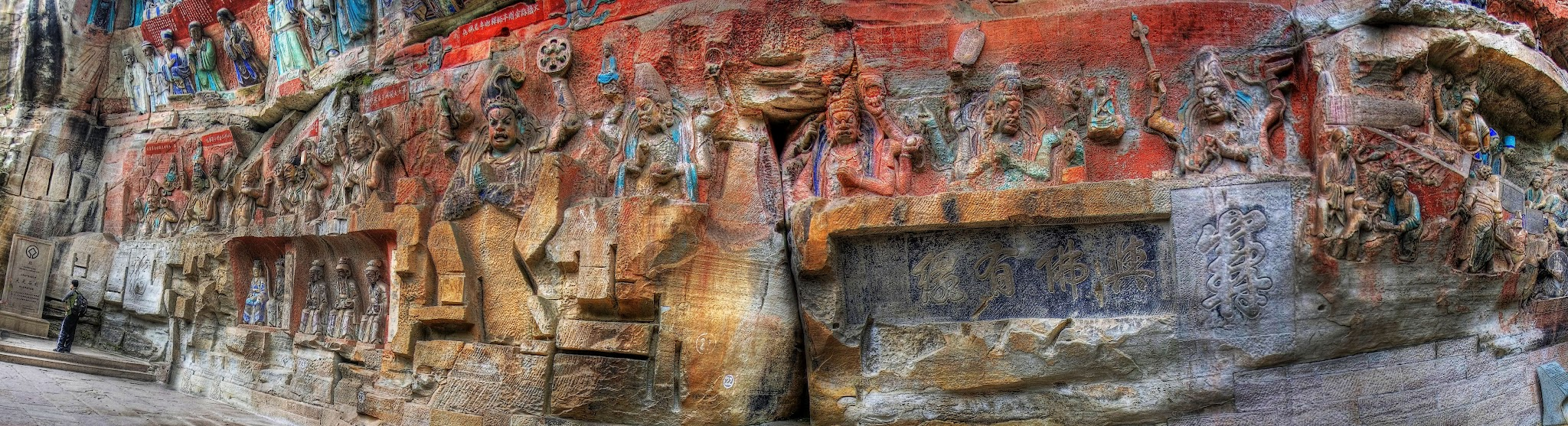
Panorama of a short segment of the carvings, showing figures such as the Ten Wisdom Kings, including Acala, Hayagriva, Ucchusma, Trailokyavijaya, Yamāntaka and Kuṇḍali.
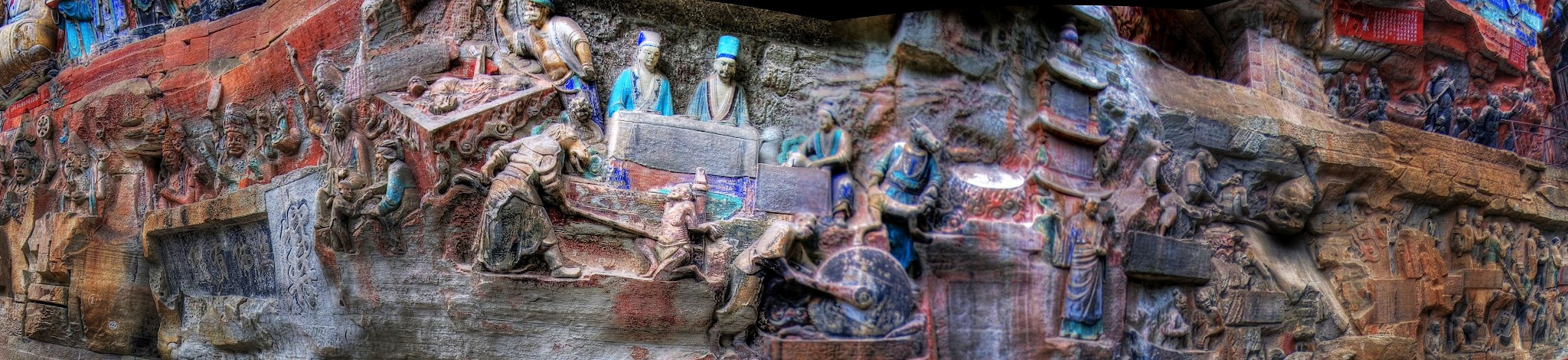
Panorama of a short segment of the carvings, showing various Buddhist figures as well as figures from Chinese history.
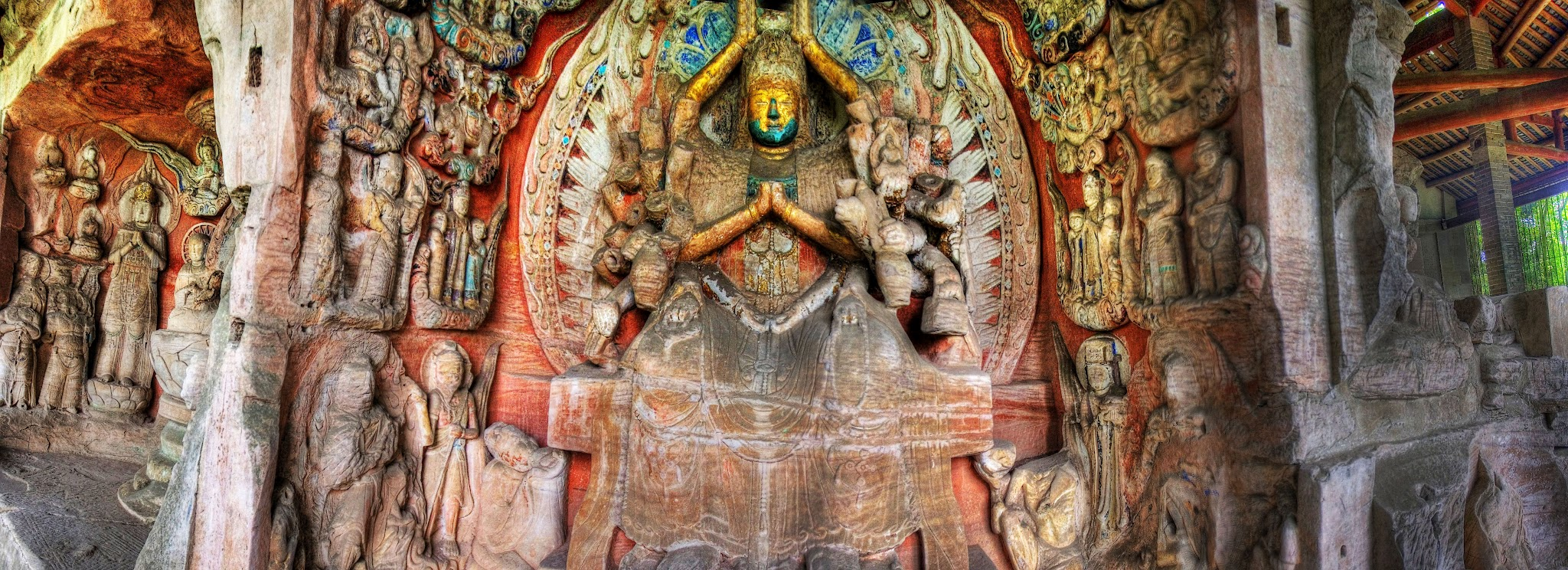
Panorama of a niche in the carvings, with the main image being that of the Thousand-armed manifestation of the Bodhisattva Guanyin, surrounded by various devas.

== Gallery ==
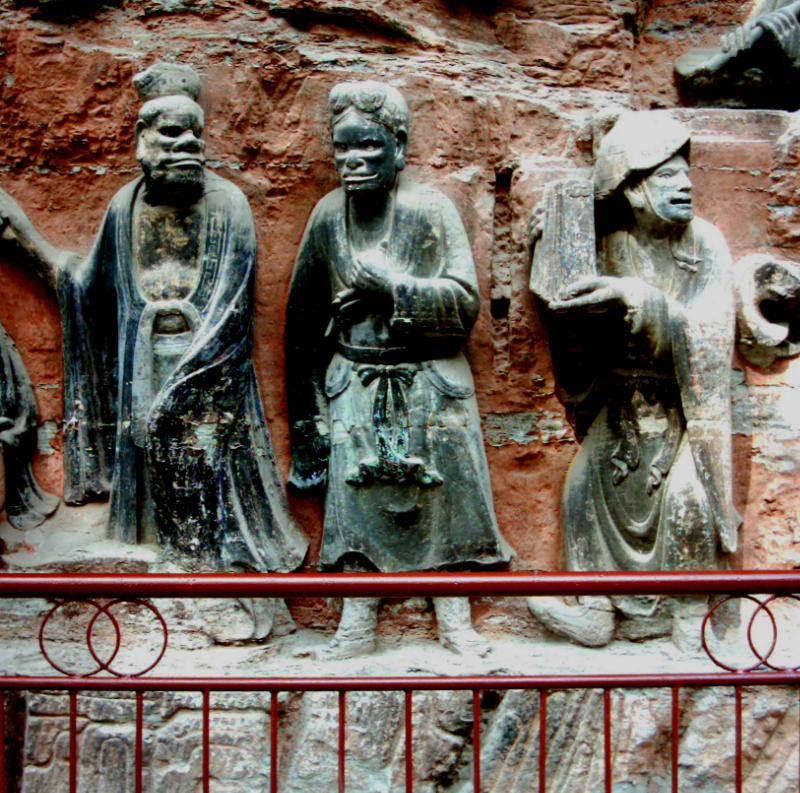
Dazu rock carving at Baodingshan

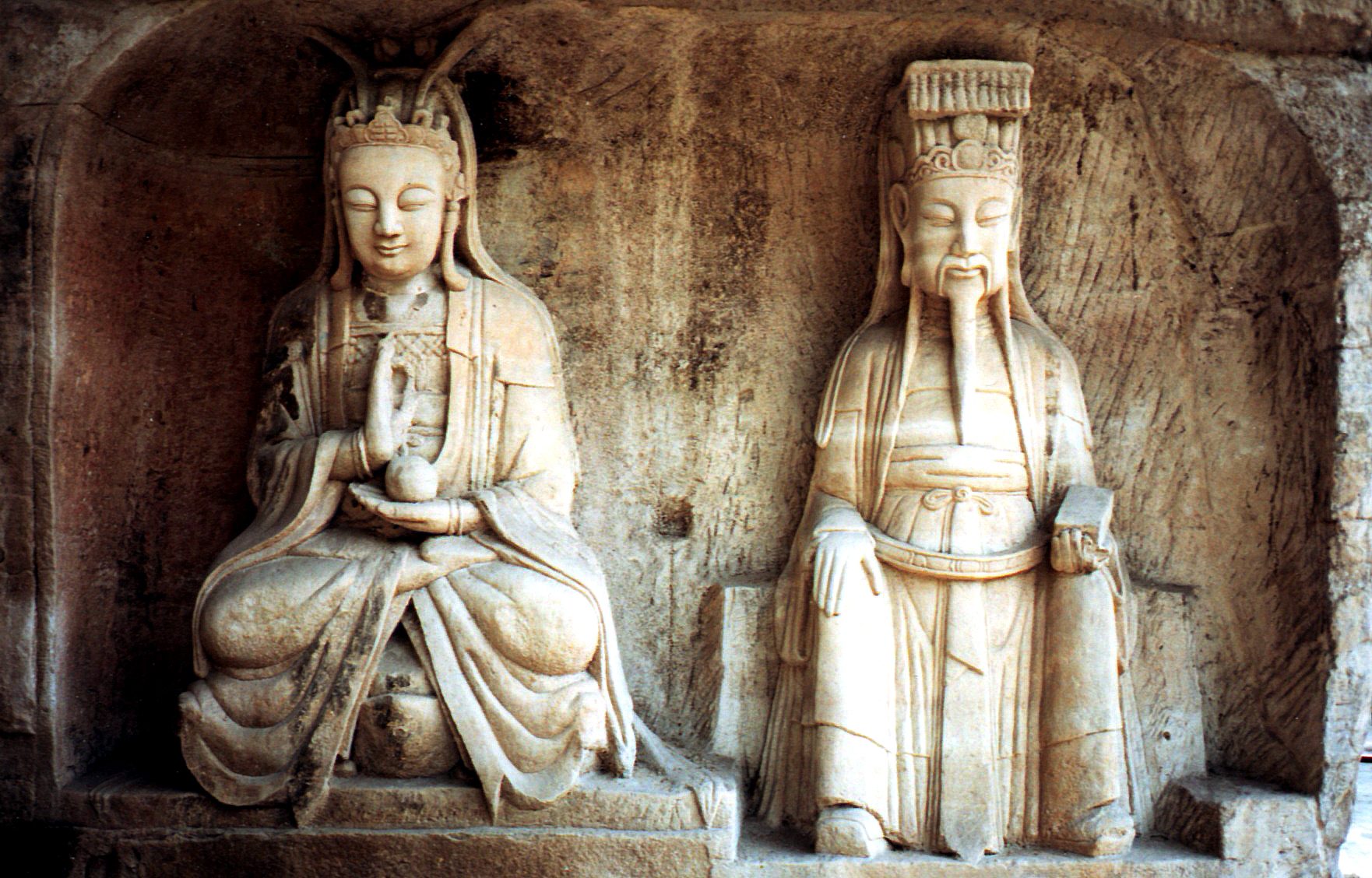
Dazu rock carvings at Baodingshan

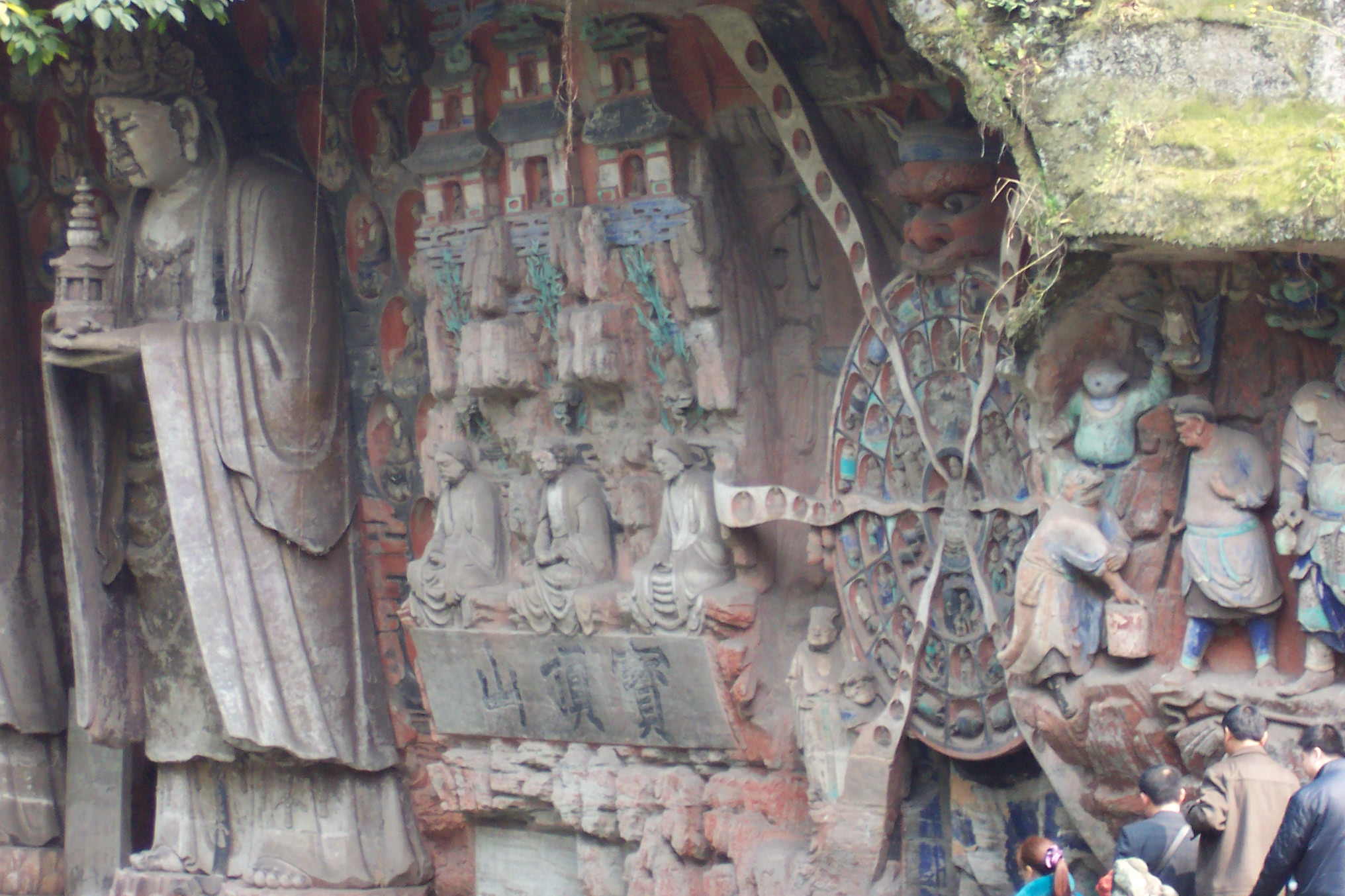
Statues of various Buddhas at Baodingshan

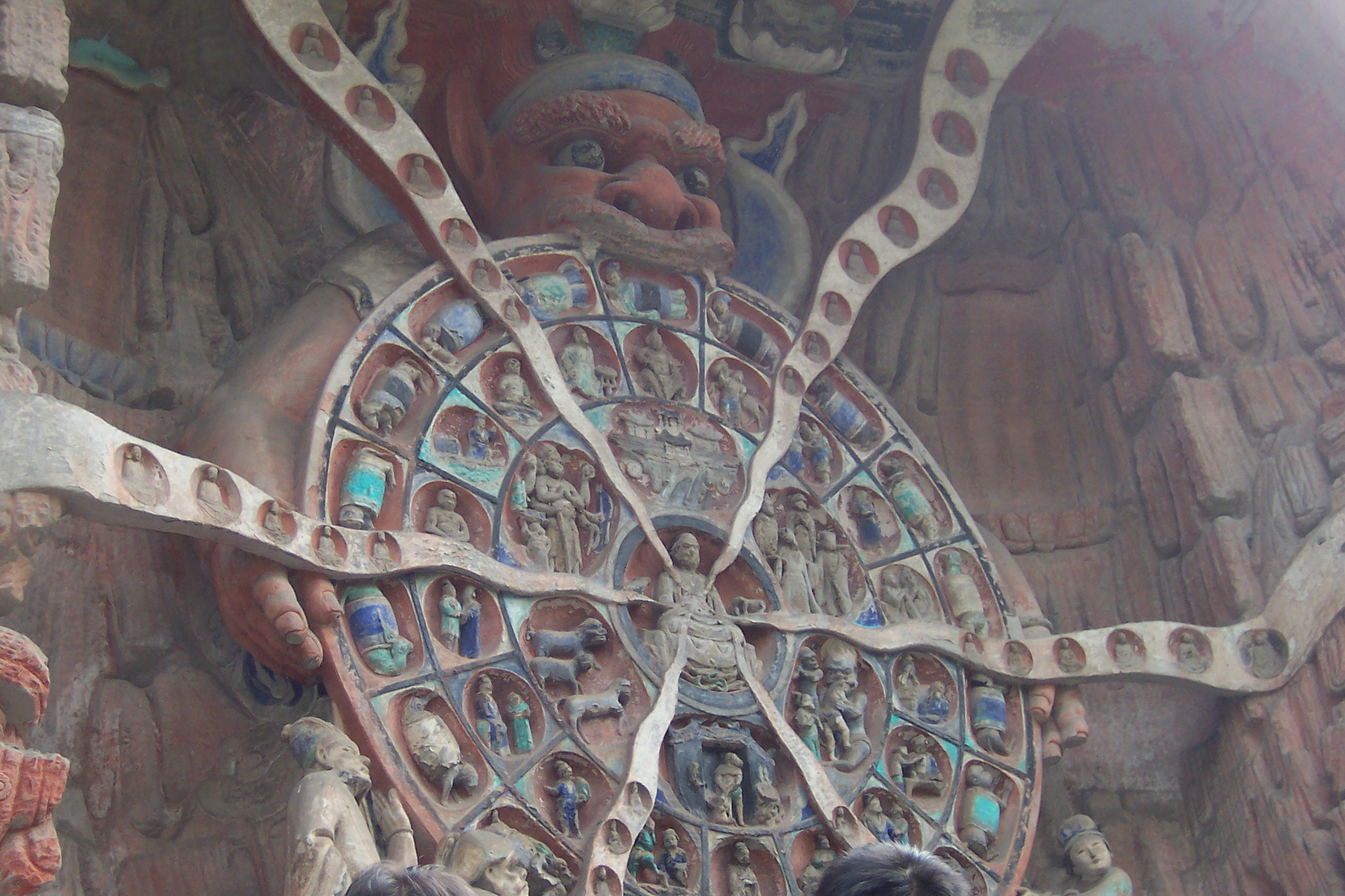
A Bhavacakra depicting the realms of samsara at Baodingshan

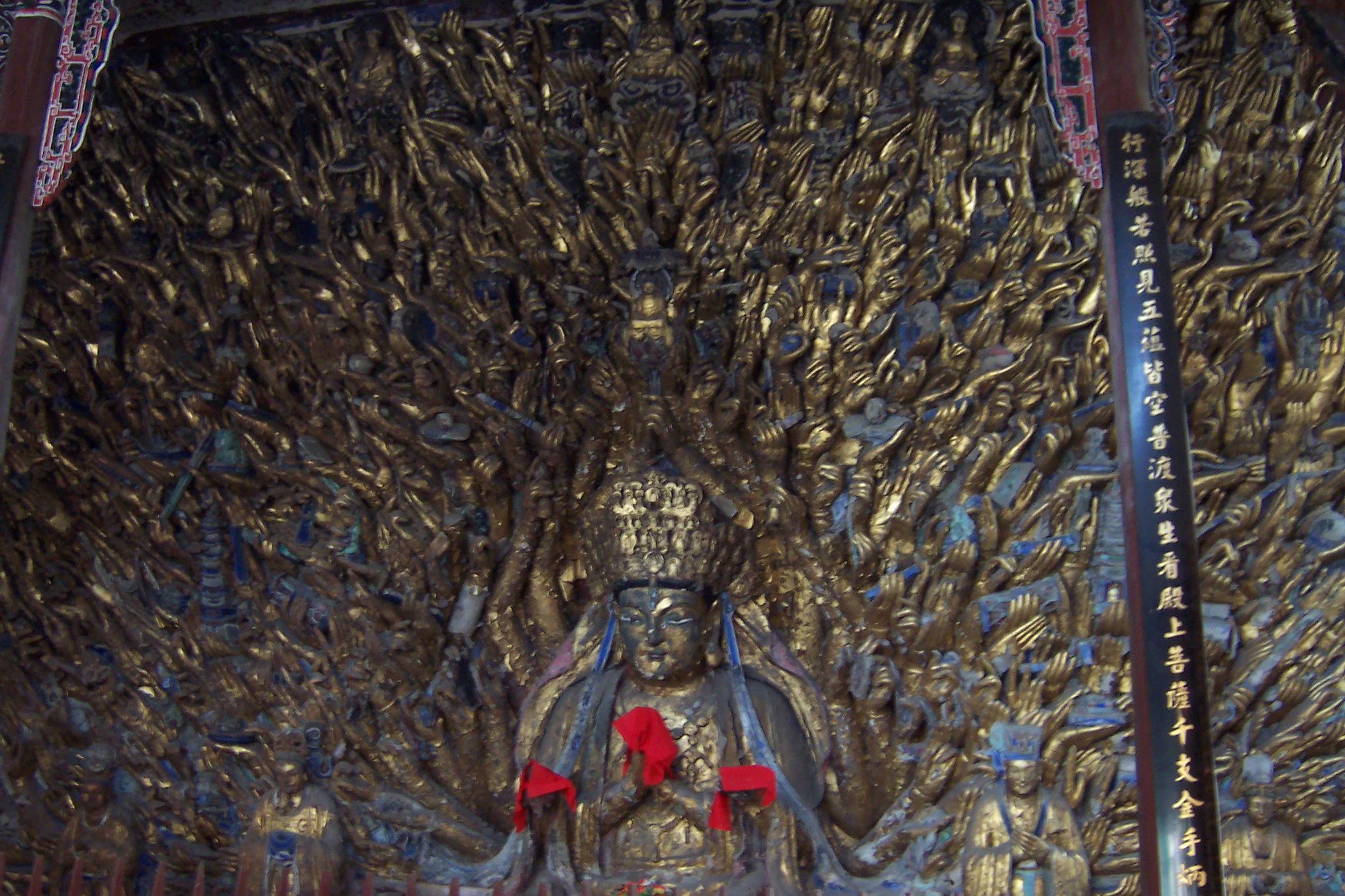
The Thousand-armed manifestation of Guanyin at Baodingshan

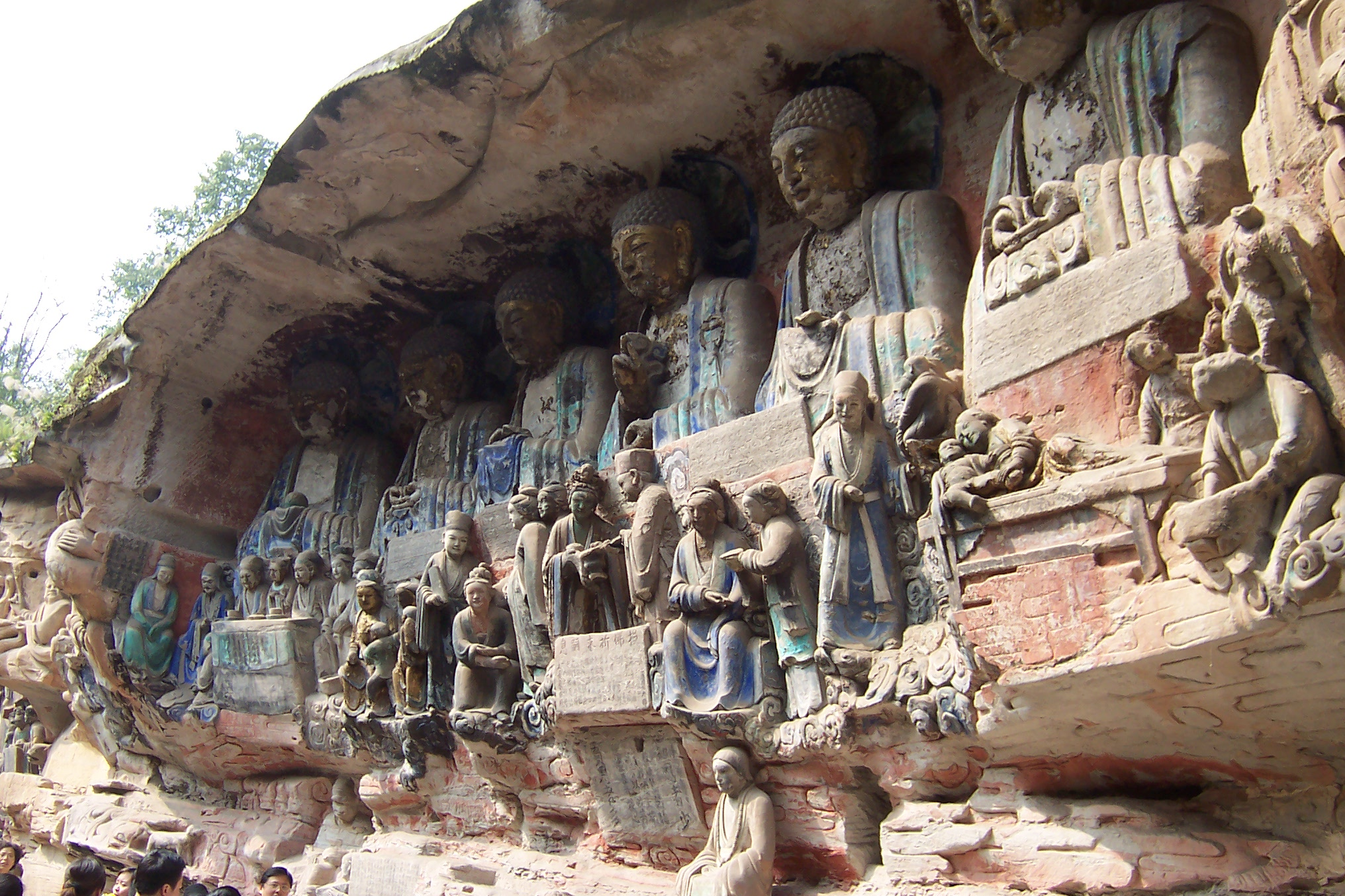
Baodingshan Buddha statues

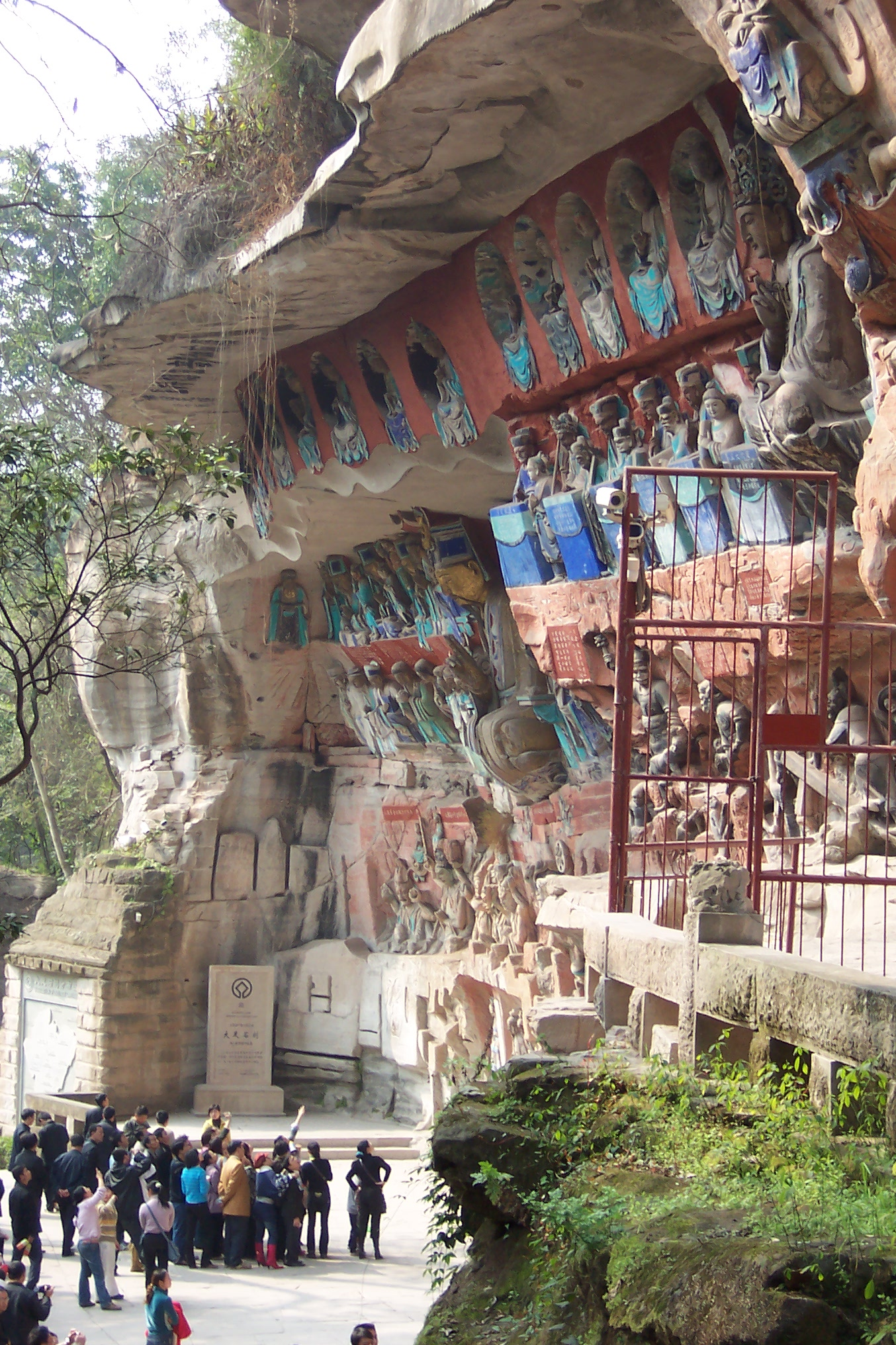
Baodingshan panorama of the eighteen layers of hell

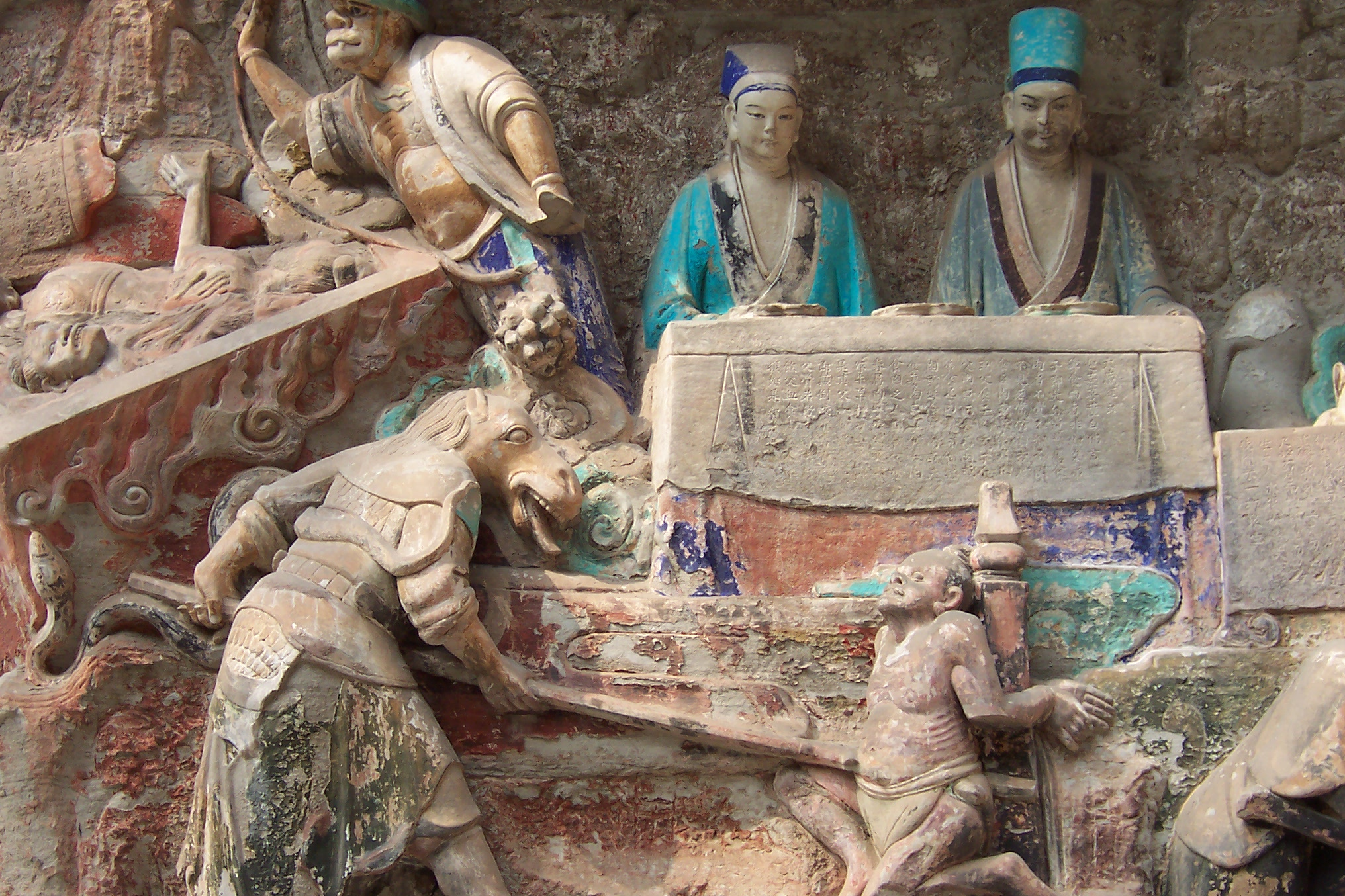
Statues of demons and officials of hell

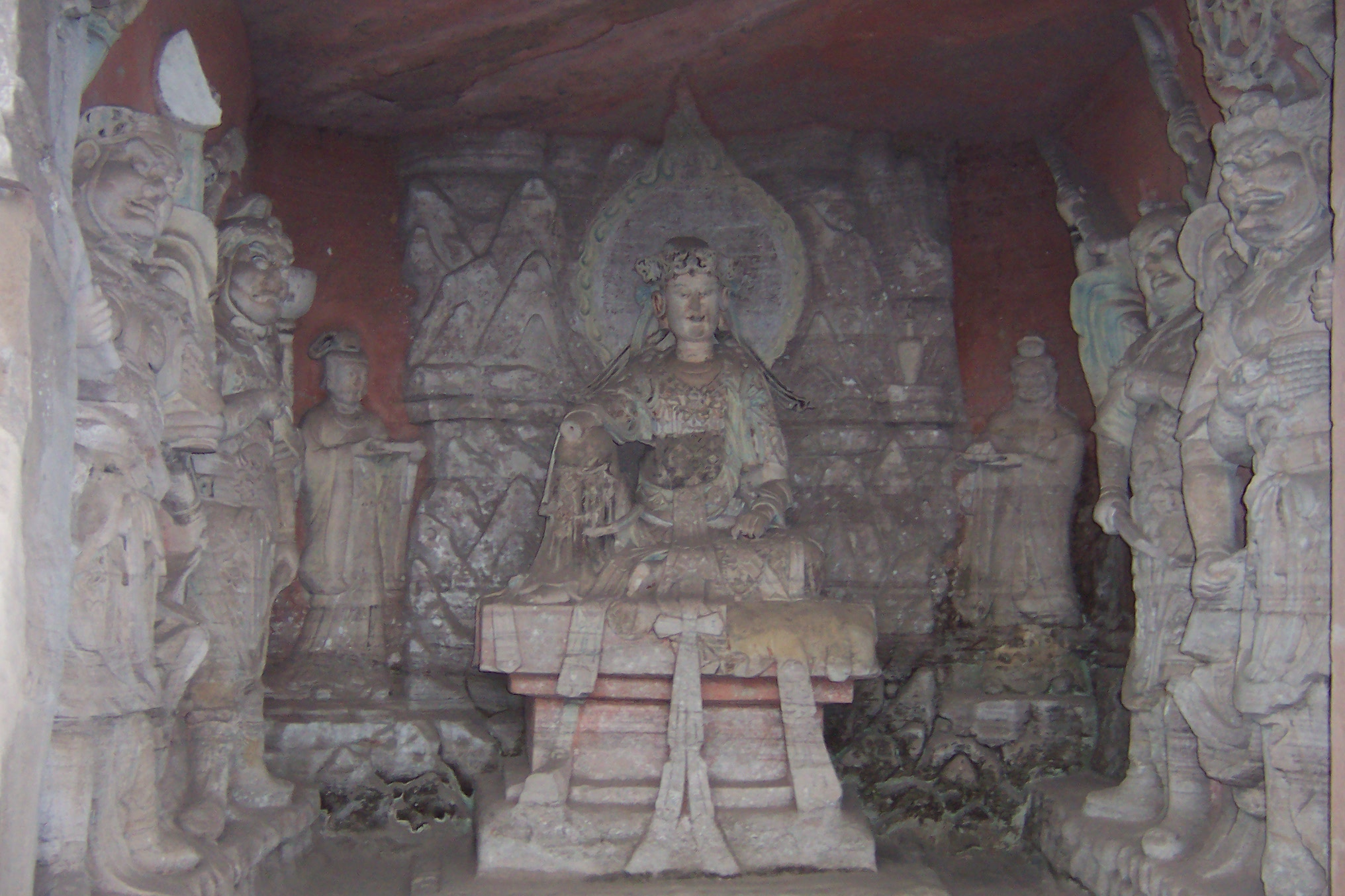
Statue of the bodhisattva Guanyin at Beishan

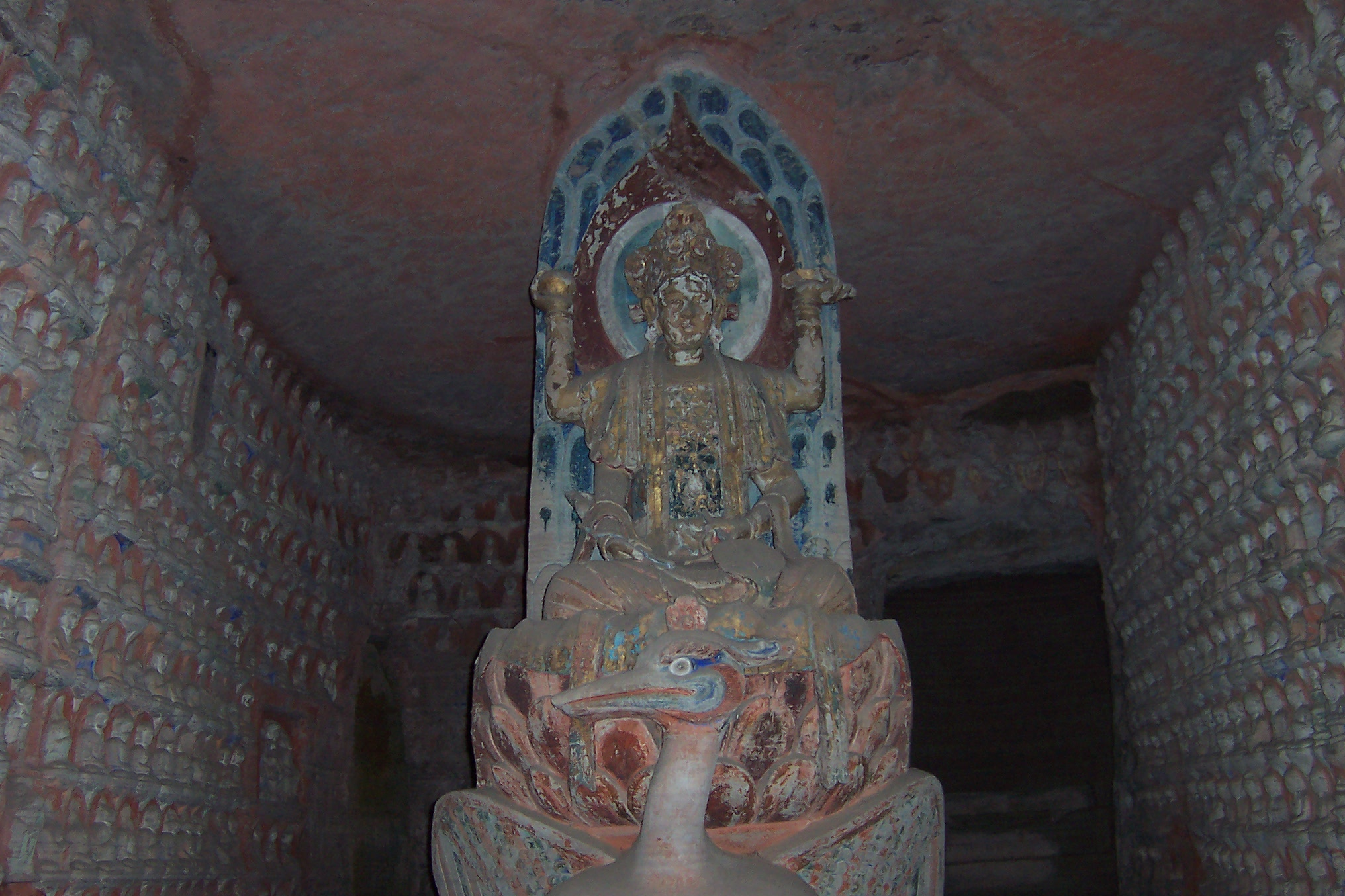
The Wisdom King Mahamayuri riding on her peacock mount

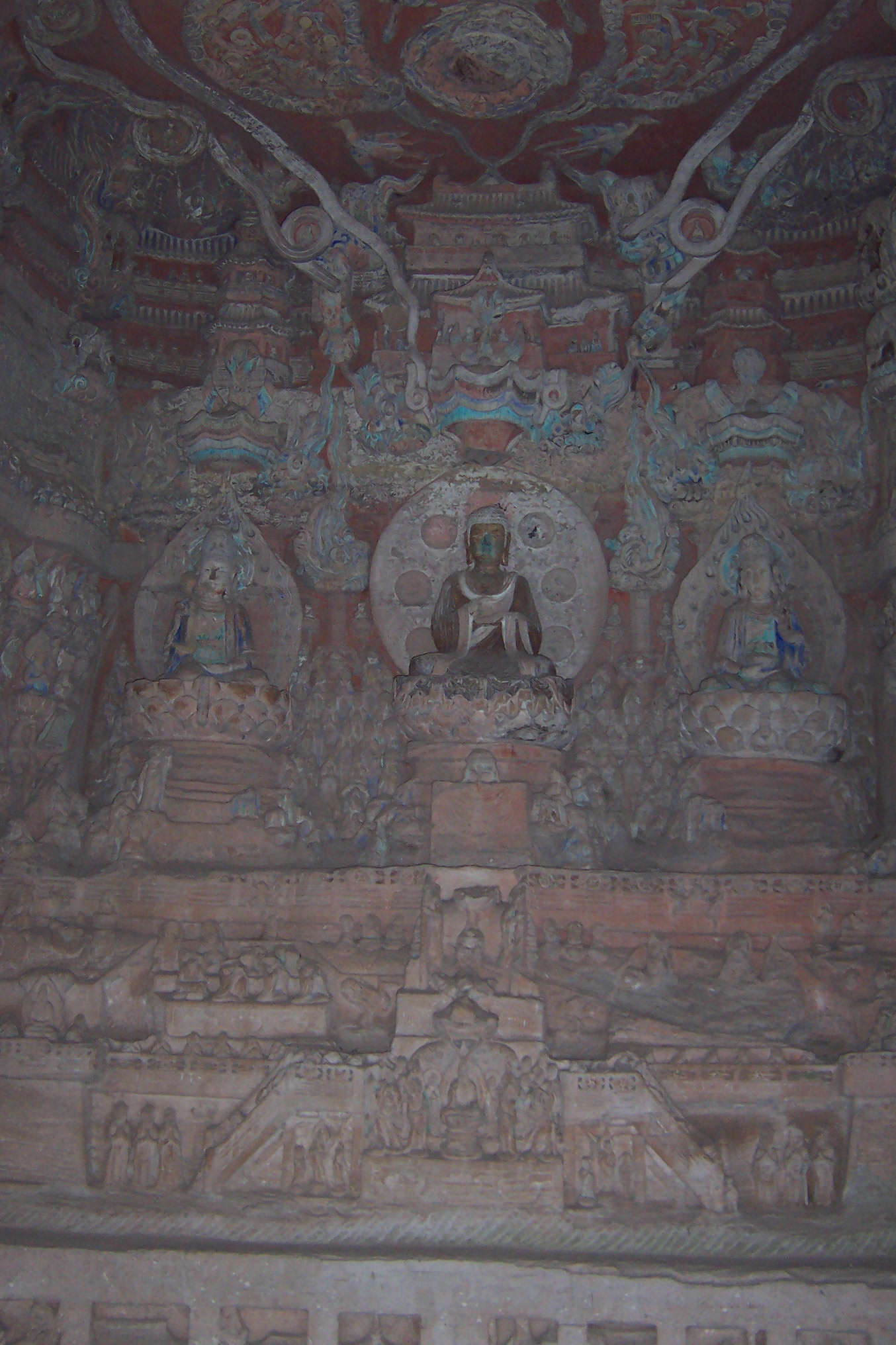
Various Buddhas at Beishan

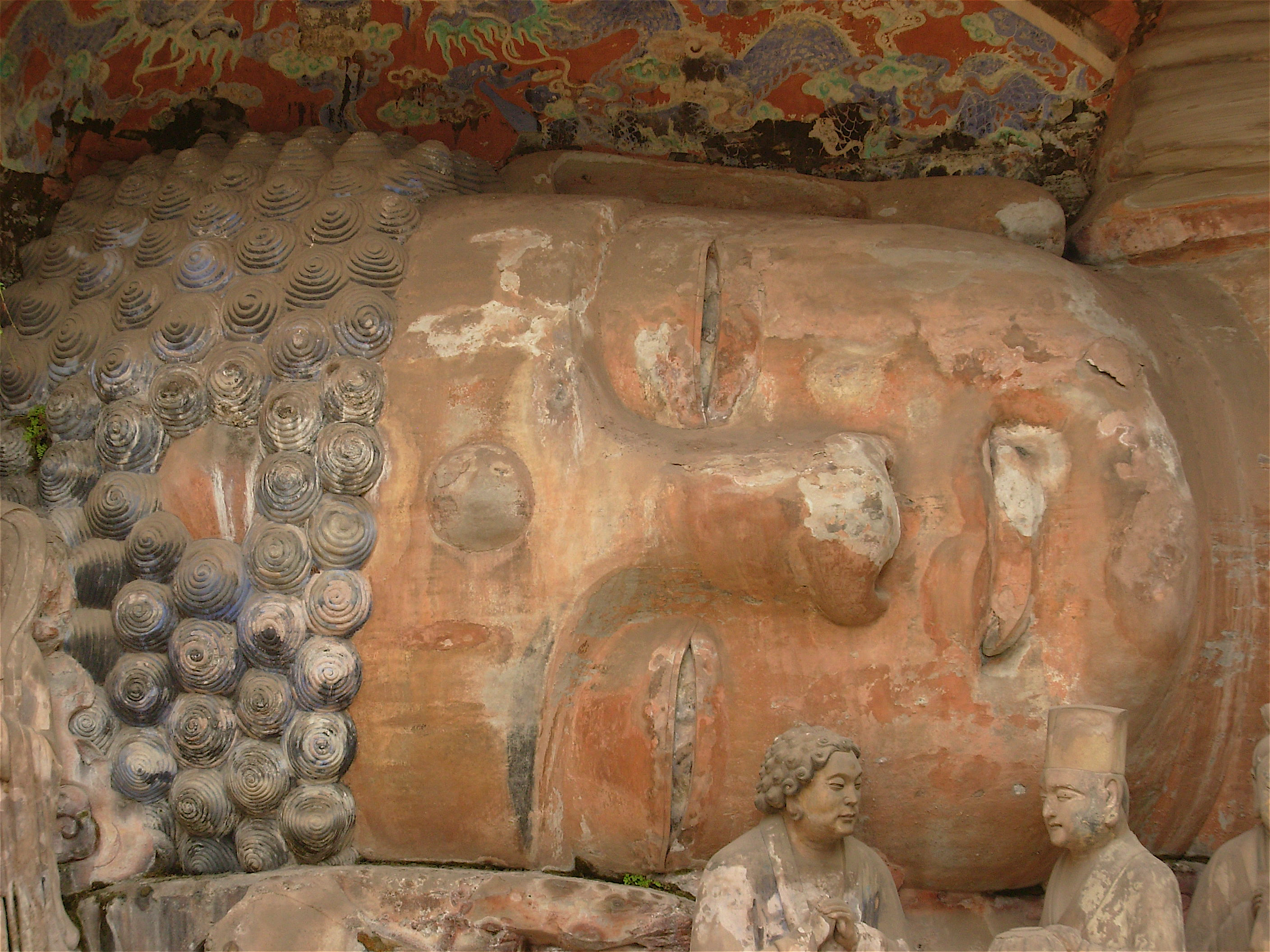
Statue depicting Sakyamuni Buddha entering Nirvana at Beishan

== Transport ==
- Dazushike railway station on Chengdu-Chongqing Central line high-speed railway is currently under construction

== See also ==
- Dazu Lotus Manor, a nearby attraction
- Tianlongshan Grottoes
