= Chinatown =

Ethnic enclave of Chinese expatriates

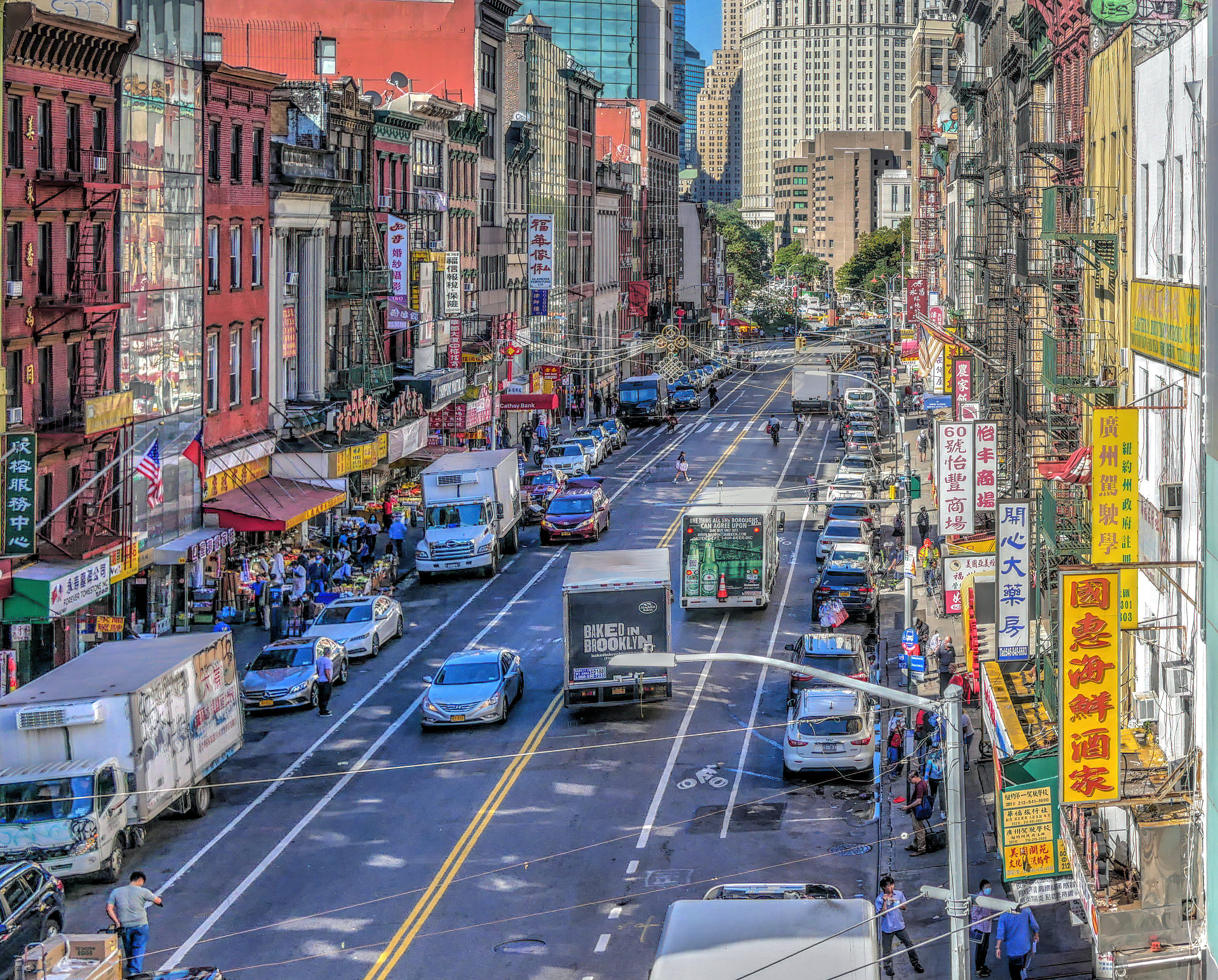
- New York's Manhattan Chinatown has the highest concentration of Chinese people outside of Asia.
- Chinese: 唐人街
- Literal meaning: "Tang people street"
Transcriptions
Standard Mandarin
- Hanyu Pinyin: Tángrénjiē
- Bopomofo: ㄊㄤˊ ㄖㄣˊ ㄐㄧㄝ
- Wade–Giles: Tʻang^{2} jen^{2} chieh^{1}
- IPA: [tʰǎŋ.ɻə̌n.tɕjé]
Wu
- Romanization: Daon^{平} nin^{平} ka^{平}
Hakka
- Romanization: Tongˇ nginˇ gieˊ
Yue: Cantonese
- Yale Romanization: Tòhngyàhngāai
- Jyutping: Tong4 jan4 gaai1
- IPA: [tʰɔŋ˩ jɐn˩ kaj˥]
Southern Min
- Hokkien POJ: Tông-jîn-ke
Eastern Min
- Fuzhou BUC: Tòng-ìng-kĕ

Alternative Chinese name
- Traditional Chinese: 中國城
- Simplified Chinese: 中国城
- Literal meaning: "China-town"
Transcriptions
Standard Mandarin
- Hanyu Pinyin: Zhōngguóchéng
- Bopomofo: ㄓㄨㄥ ㄍㄨㄛˊ ㄔㄥˊ
- Wade–Giles: Chung^{1}-kuo^{2} chʻeng^{2}
- IPA: [ʈʂʊ́ŋ.kwǒ.ʈʂʰə̌ŋ]
Wu
- Romanization: Tson^{平} koh^{入} zen^{平}
Hakka
- Romanization: Zungˊ guedˋ sangˇ
Yue: Cantonese
- Yale Romanization: Jūnggwoksìhng
- Jyutping: Zung1 gwok3 sing4
- IPA: [tsʊŋ˥.kʷɔk̚˧.sɪŋ˩]
Southern Min
- Hokkien POJ: Tiong-kok-siânn
Eastern Min
- Fuzhou BUC: Dŭng-guók-siàng

Second alternative Chinese name
- Traditional Chinese: 華埠
- Simplified Chinese: 华埠
- Literal meaning: "Chinese district"
Transcriptions
Standard Mandarin
- Hanyu Pinyin: Huábù
- Bopomofo: ㄏㄨㄚˊ ㄅㄨˋ
- Wade–Giles: Hua^{2} pu^{4}
- IPA: [xwǎ.pû]
Wu
- Romanization: Gho^{平} bu^{去}
Hakka
- Romanization: Faˇ pu
Yue: Cantonese
- Yale Romanization: Wàhfauh
- Jyutping: Waa4 fau6
- IPA: [wa˩ fɐw˨]
Southern Min
- Hokkien POJ: Hôa-bú
Eastern Min
- Fuzhou BUC: Huà-pú

Chinatown (Chinese: 唐人街) is a common term used to describe an ethnic enclave of Chinese people located outside of Mainland China, Hong Kong, Macau, and Taiwan, typically situated in an urban area. Chinatowns can be found around the world, including in Europe, Asia, Africa, Oceania, and the Americas. The history of Chinatowns date back to the Tang dynasty in the 10th century, arising from the nation's important role in global trade.

Binondo in Manila, established in 1594, is recognized as the world's oldest standing Chinatown. Notable early examples outside Asia include San Francisco's Chinatown in the United States and Melbourne's Chinatown in Australia, which were founded in the early 1850s during the California and Victoria gold rushes, respectively. A more modern example, in Montville, Connecticut, was caused by the displacement of Chinese workers in New York's Manhattan Chinatown following the September 11th attacks in 2001.

== Definition ==
Oxford Dictionaries defines "Chinatown" as "... a district of any non-Asian town, especially a city or seaport, in which the population is predominantly of Chinese origin". However, some Chinatowns may have little to do with China. Some "Vietnamese" enclaves are in fact a city's "second Chinatown", and some Chinatowns are in fact pan-Asian, meaning they could also be counted as a Koreatown or Little India. One example includes Asiatown in Cleveland, Ohio. It was initially referred to as a Chinatown but was subsequently renamed due to the influx of non-Chinese Asian Americans who opened businesses there. Today the district acts as a unifying factor for the Chinese, Taiwanese, Korean, Japanese, Filipino, Indian, Vietnamese, Cambodian, Laotian, Nepalese and Thai communities of Cleveland.

Further ambiguities with the term can include Chinese ethnoburbs which by definition are "... suburban ethnic clusters of residential areas and business districts in large metropolitan areas An article in The New York Times blurs the line further by categorizing very different Chinatowns such as Chinatown, Manhattan, which exists in an urban setting as "traditional"; Monterey Park's Chinatown, which exists in a "suburban" setting (and labeled as such); and Austin, Texas's Chinatown, which is in essence a "fabricated" Chinese-themed mall. This contrasts with narrower definitions, where the term only described Chinatown in a city setting.

== History ==
Trading centers populated predominantly by Chinese men and their native spouses have long existed throughout Southeast Asia. Emigration to other parts of the world from China accelerated in the 1860s with the signing of the Treaty of Peking (1860), which opened China's borders to free movement. Early emigrants came primarily from the coastal provinces of Guangdong (Canton, Kwangtung) and Fujian (Fukien, Hokkien) in southeastern China – where the people generally speak Toishanese, Cantonese, Hakka, Teochew (Chiuchow), and Hokkien. In the late 19th century and early 20th century, a significant amount of Chinese emigration to North America originated from four counties called Sze Yup, located west of the Pearl River Delta in Guangdong province, making Toishanese a dominant variety of the Chinese language spoken in Chinatowns in Canada and the United States.

As conditions in China have improved in recent decades, many Chinatowns have lost their initial mission, which was to provide a transitional place into a new culture. As net migration has slowed in them, the smaller Chinatowns have slowly decayed, often to the point of becoming purely historical and no longer serving as ethnic enclaves.

=== In Asia ===
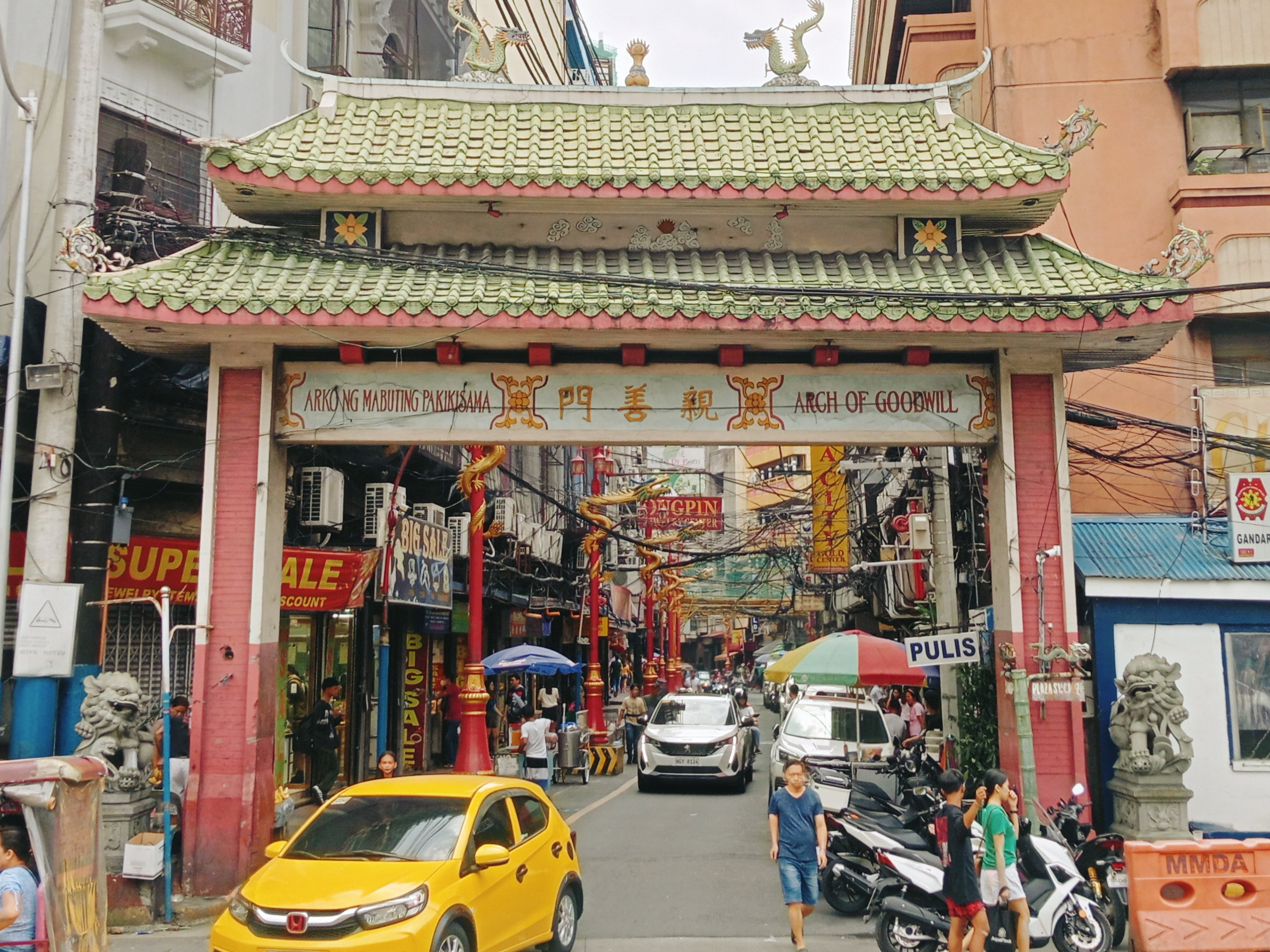
Established in 1594, Binondo in Manila is home to the world's oldest Chinatown.

In the Spanish Philippines, where the oldest surviving Chinatowns are located, the district where Chinese migrants (sangleyes) were required to live is called a parián, which were originally a marketplace for trade goods. Most of them were established in the late 16th century and became settlements of Chinese migrants due to the early Spanish colonial policy of ethnic segregation. There were numerous pariáns throughout the Philippines in various locations, the names of which still survive into modern district names. This include the Parián de Arroceros of Intramuros, Manila (which was eventually moved several times, ending up in Binondo). The term was also carried into Latin America by Filipino migrants. The central market place of Mexico City (now part of Zócalo) selling imported goods from the Manila galleons in the 18th and early 19th centuries was called "Parián de Manila" (or just "Parián").

Along the coastal areas of Southeast Asia, several Chinese settlements existed as early as the 16th century according to Zheng He and Tomé Pires' travel accounts. Melaka during the Portuguese colonial period, for instance, had a large Chinese population in Campo China. They settled down at port towns under the authority's approval for trading. After the European colonial powers seized and ruled the port towns in the 16th century, Chinese supported European traders and colonists, and created autonomous settlements.

Several Asian Chinatowns, although not yet called by that name, have a long history. Those in Nagasaki, Kobe, and Yokohama, Japan, Binondo in Manila, Hoi An and Bao Vinh in central Vietnam all existed in 1600. Glodok, the Chinese quarter of Jakarta, Indonesia, dates to 1740.

Chinese presence in India dates back to the 5th century CE, with the first recorded Chinese settler in Calcutta named Young Atchew around 1780. Chinatowns first appeared in the Indian cities of Kolkata, Mumbai, and Chennai.

The Chinatown centered on Yaowarat Road in Bangkok, Thailand, was founded at the same time as the city itself, in 1782.

=== Outside of Asia ===
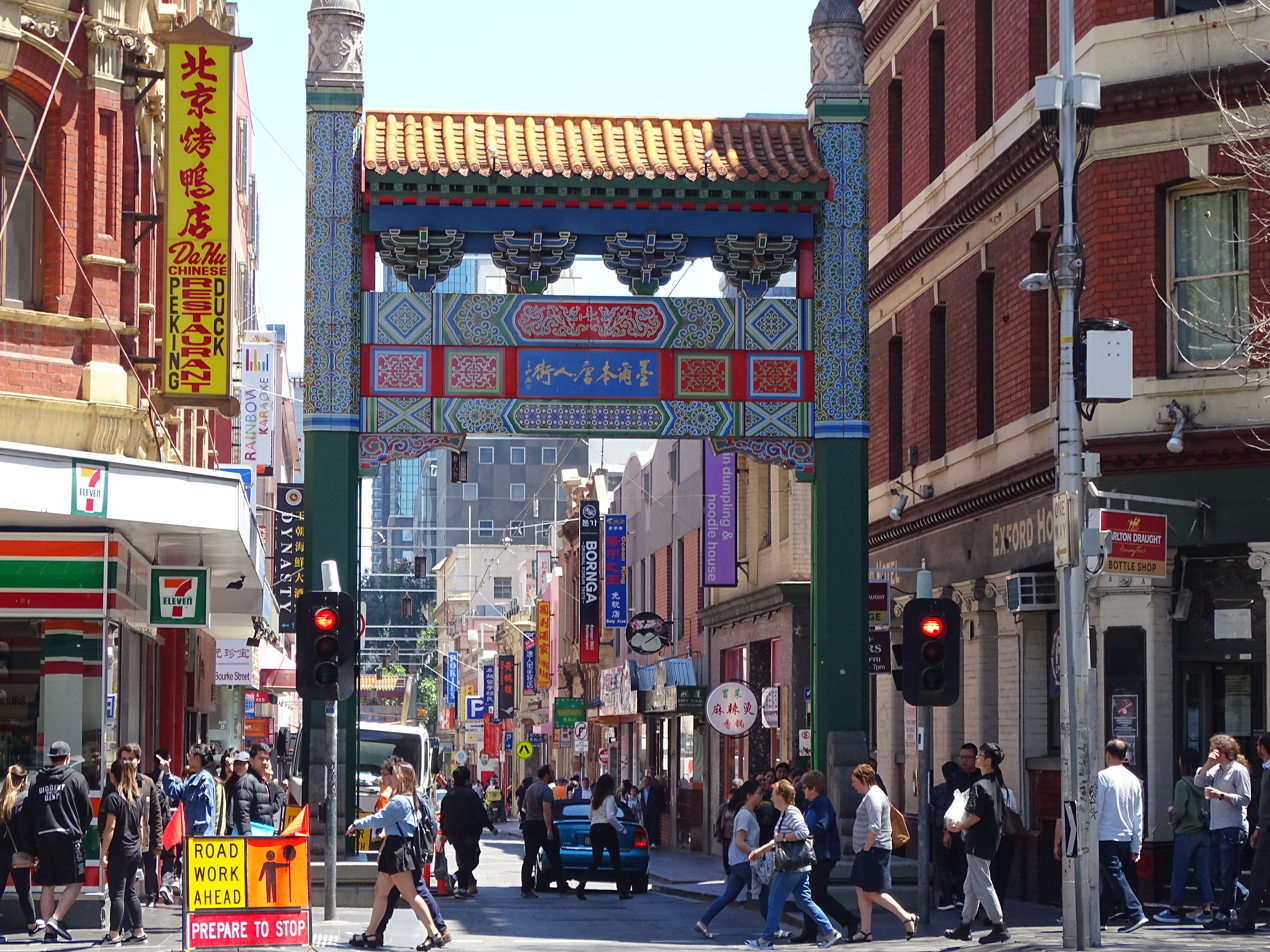
Chinatown, Melbourne is the longest continuous Chinese settlement in the Western World and the oldest Chinatown in the Southern Hemisphere.

Many Chinese immigrants arrived in Liverpool in the late 1850s in the employ of the Blue Funnel Shipping Line, a cargo transport company established by Alfred Holt. The commercial shipping line created strong trade links between the cities of Shanghai, Hong Kong, and Liverpool, mainly in the importation of silk, cotton, and tea. They settled near the docks in south Liverpool, this area was heavily bombed during World War II, causing the Chinese community moving to the current location Liverpool Chinatown on Nelson Street.

The Chinatown in San Francisco is one of the largest in North America and the oldest north of Mexico. It served as a port of entry for early Chinese immigrants from the 1850s to the 1900s. The area was the one geographical region deeded by the city government and private property owners which allowed Chinese persons to inherit and inhabit dwellings within the city. Many Chinese found jobs working for large companies seeking a source of labor, most famously as part of the Central Pacific on the Transcontinental Railroad. Since it started in Omaha, that city had a notable Chinatown for almost a century. Other cities in North America where Chinatowns were founded in the mid-nineteenth century include almost every major settlement along the West Coast from San Diego to Victoria. Other early immigrants worked as mine workers or independent prospectors hoping to strike it rich during the 1849 Gold Rush.

Economic opportunity drove the building of further Chinatowns in the United States. The initial Chinatowns were built in the Western United States in states such as California, Oregon, Washington, Idaho, Utah, Colorado and Arizona. As the transcontinental railroad was built, more Chinatowns started to appear in railroad towns such as St. Louis, Chicago, Cincinnati, Pittsburgh and Butte, Montana. Chinatowns then subsequently emerged in many East Coast cities, including New York City, Boston, Philadelphia, Providence and Baltimore. With the passage of the Emancipation Proclamation, many southern states such as Arkansas, Louisiana and Georgia began to hire Chinese for work in place of slave labor.

The history of Chinatowns was not always peaceful, especially when labor disputes arose. Racial tensions flared when lower-paid Chinese workers replaced white miners in many mountain-area Chinatowns, such as in Wyoming with the Rock Springs Massacre. Many of these frontier Chinatowns became extinct as American racism surged and the Chinese Exclusion Act was passed.

In Australia, the Victorian gold rush, which began in 1851, attracted Chinese prospectors from the Guangdong area. A community began to form in the eastern end of Little Bourke Street, Melbourne by the mid-1850s; the area is still the center of the Melbourne Chinatown, making it the oldest continuously occupied Chinatown in a western city (since the San Francisco one was destroyed and rebuilt). Gradually expanding, it reached a peak in the early 20th century, with Chinese business, mainly furniture workshops, occupying a block wide swath of the city, overlapping into the adjacent 'Little Lon' red light district. With restricted immigration it shrunk again, becoming a strip of Chinese restaurants by the late 1970s, when it was celebrated with decorative arches. However, with a recent huge influx of students from mainland China, it is now the center of a much larger area of noodle shops, travel agents, restaurants, and groceries. The Australian gold rushes also saw the development of a Chinatown in Sydney, at first around The Rocks, near the docks, but it has moved twice, first in the 1890s to the east side of the Haymarket area, near the new markets, then in the 1920s concentrating on the west side. Nowadays, Sydney's Chinatown is centered on Dixon Street.

Other Chinatowns in European capitals, including Paris and London, were established at the turn of the 20th century. The first Chinatown in London was located in the Limehouse area of the East End of London at the start of the 20th century. The Chinese population engaged in business which catered to the Chinese sailors who frequented the Docklands. The area acquired a bad reputation from exaggerated reports of opium dens and slum housing.

Chinese communities in France developed through several migration streams, including the arrival of Chinese laborers during the First World War and the settlement of merchants and other migrants from southern Zhejiang, particularly Wenzhou and Qingtian. Later migration from former French Indochina, especially during the refugee crisis sparked by the end of the Vietnam War contributed to the growth of Chinatown and wider Asian communities in Belleville and the 13th arrondissement of Paris.

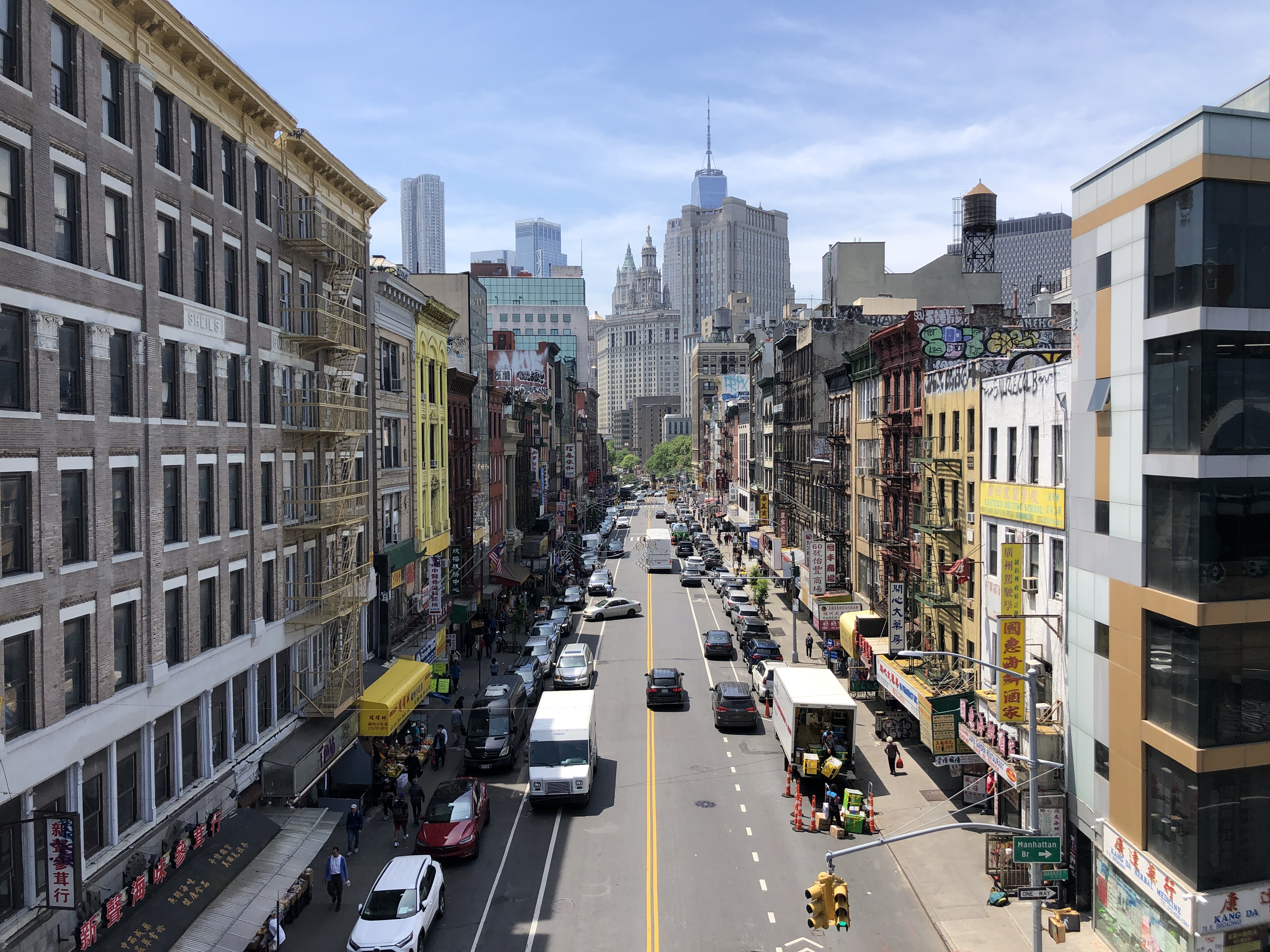
Manhattan's Chinatown, the largest concentration of Chinese people in the Western Hemisphere and one of nine Chinatown neighborhoods in New York City, as well as one of twelve in the surrounding New York metropolitan area

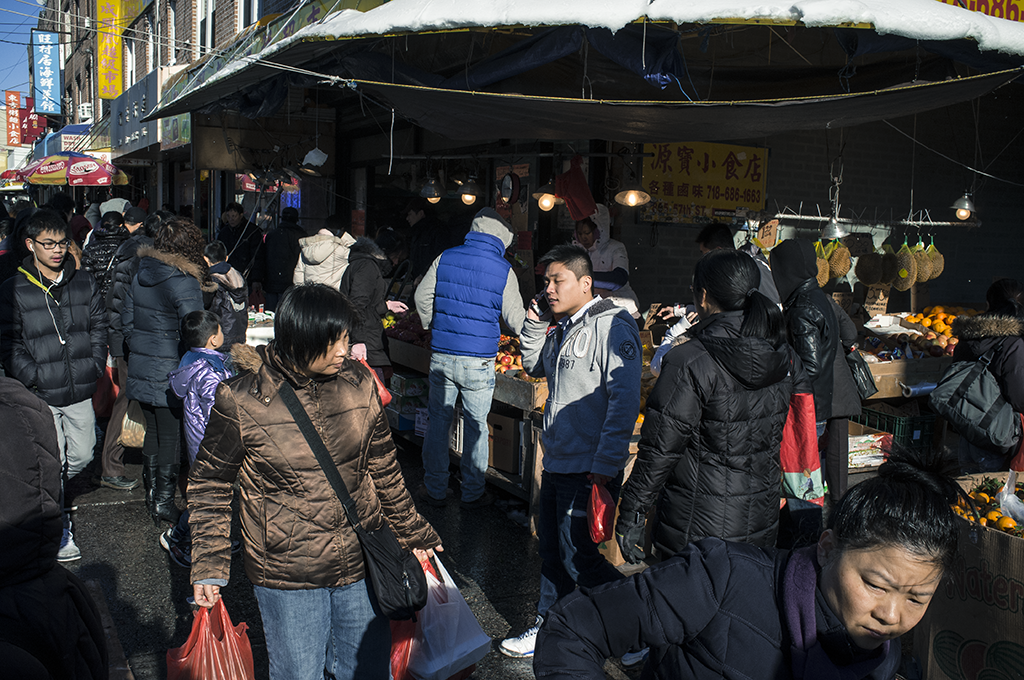
Brooklyn, the borough with the highest number of Chinatowns in New York City

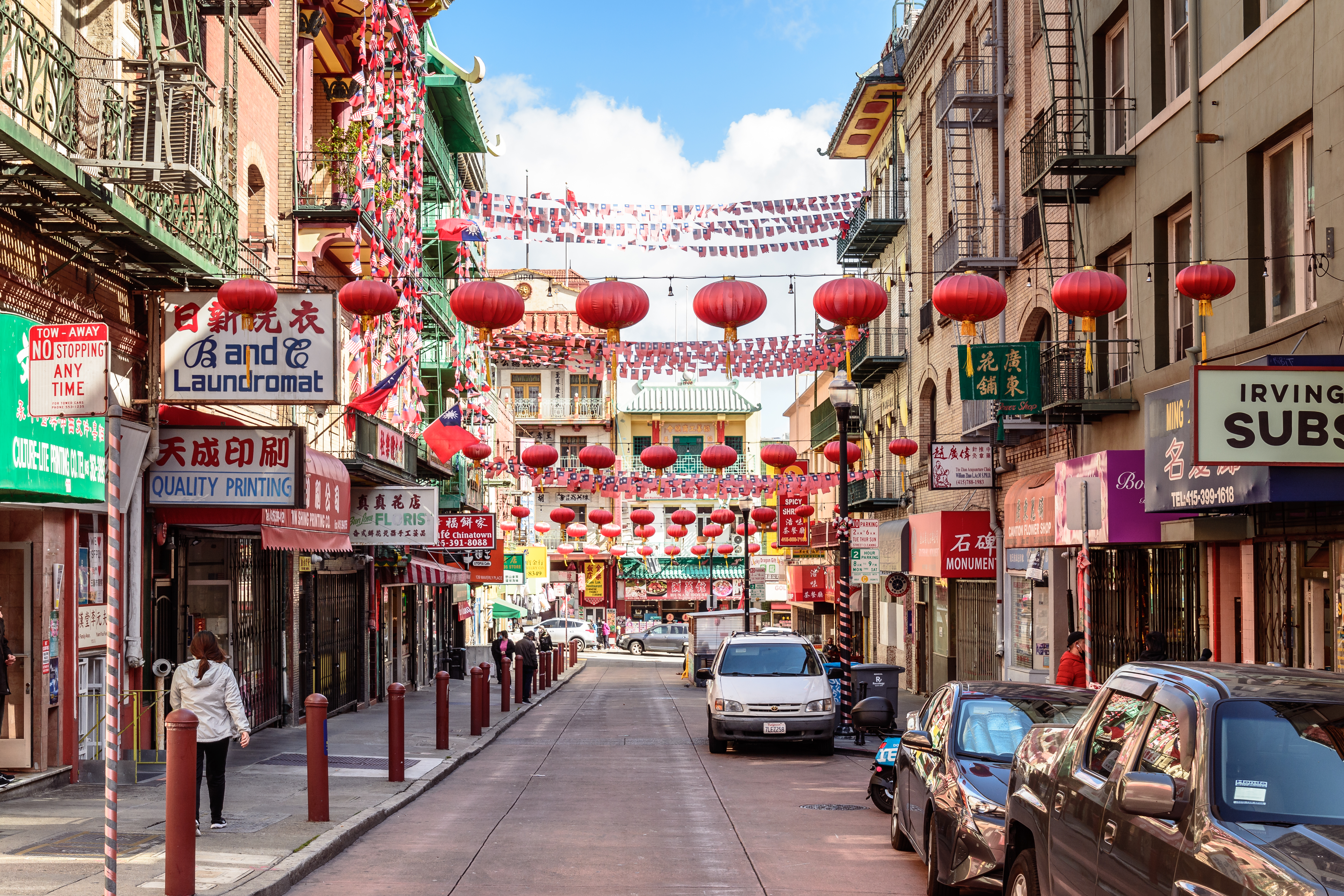
Chinatown, San Francisco, the oldest Chinatown in the US

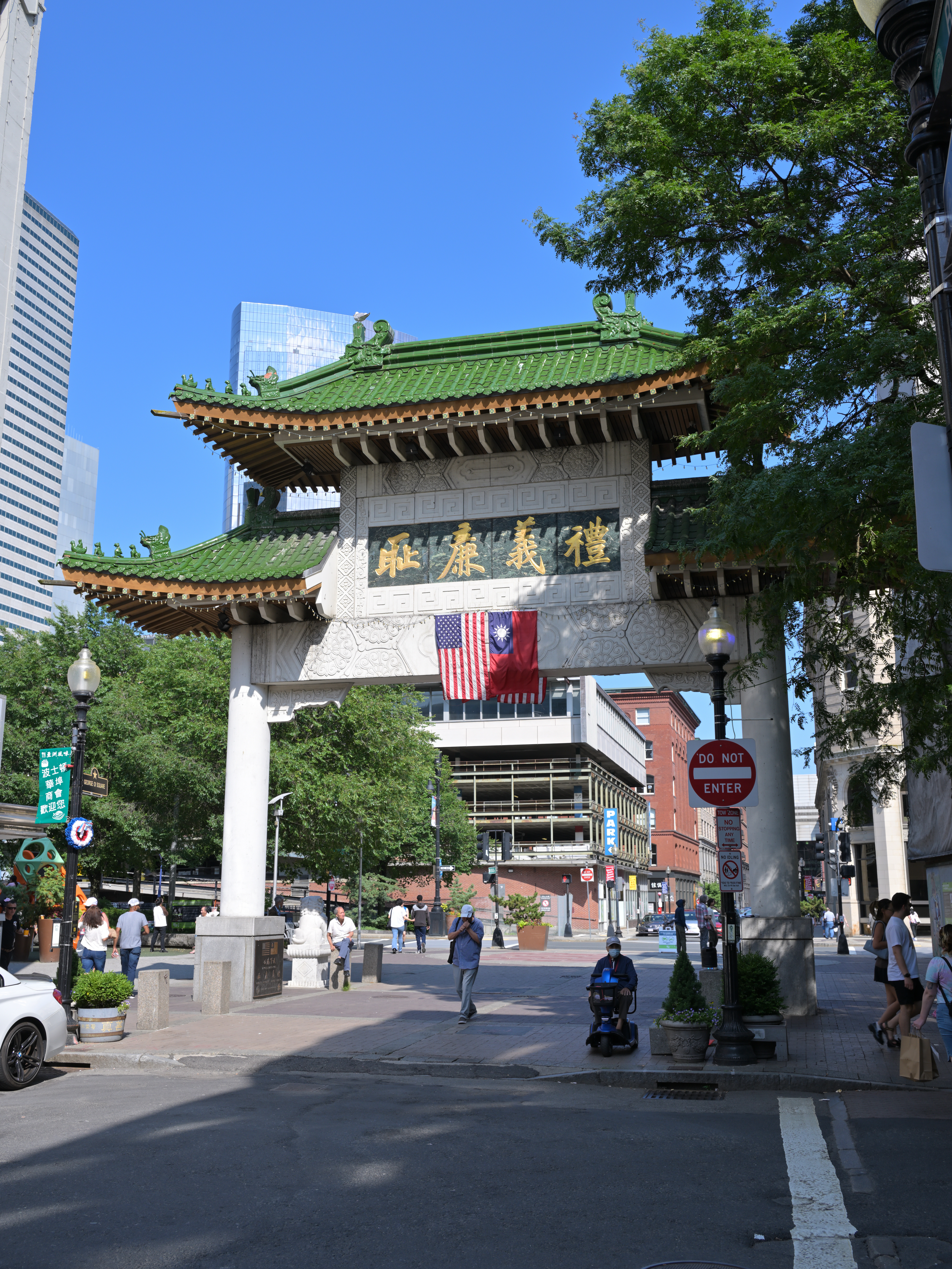
Chinatown, Boston, a Chinatown inspired and developed on the basis of modern engineering concepts

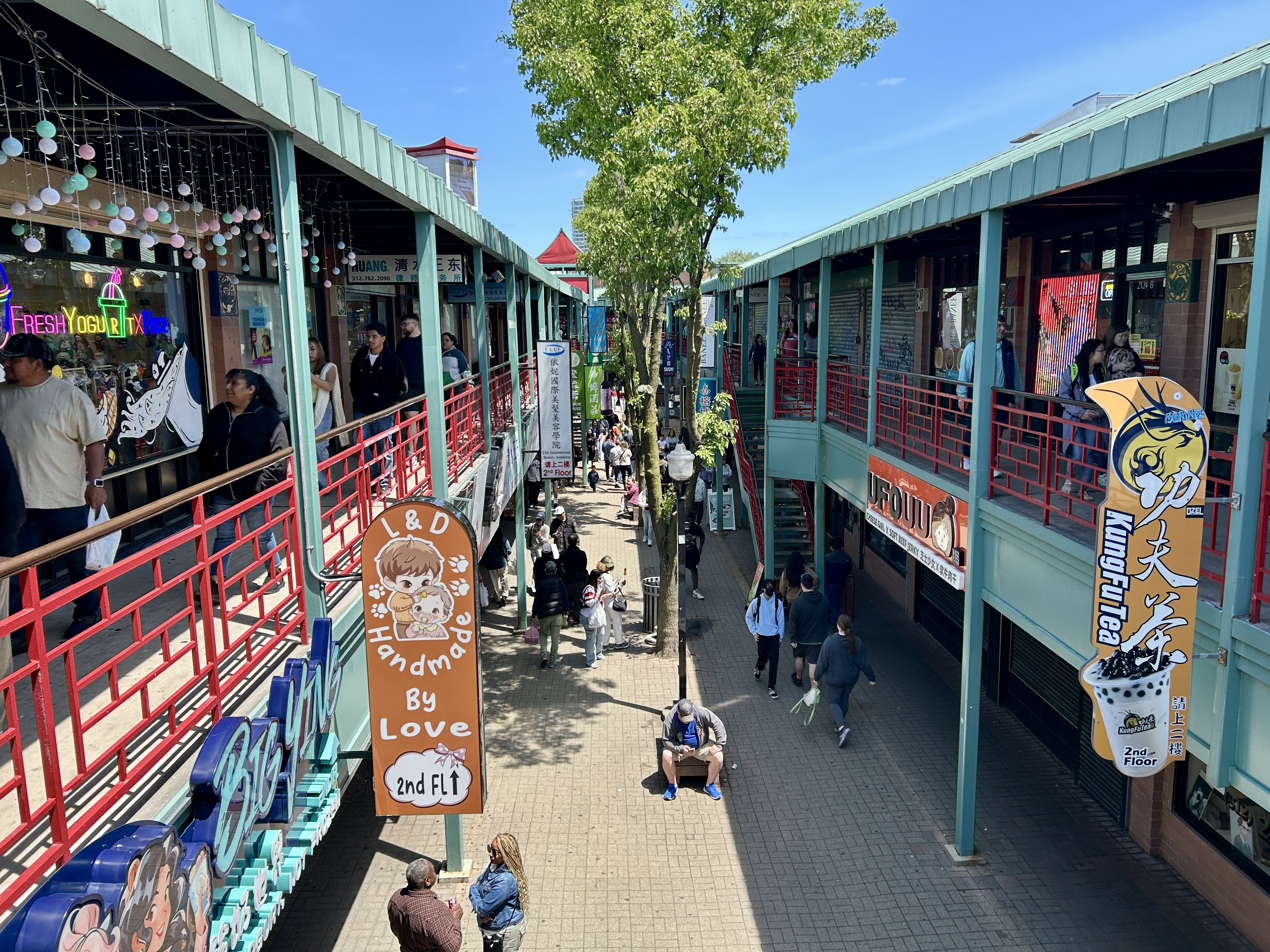
The design of Chinatown Square in Chinatown, Chicago was inspired by the Chinese Imperial Court.

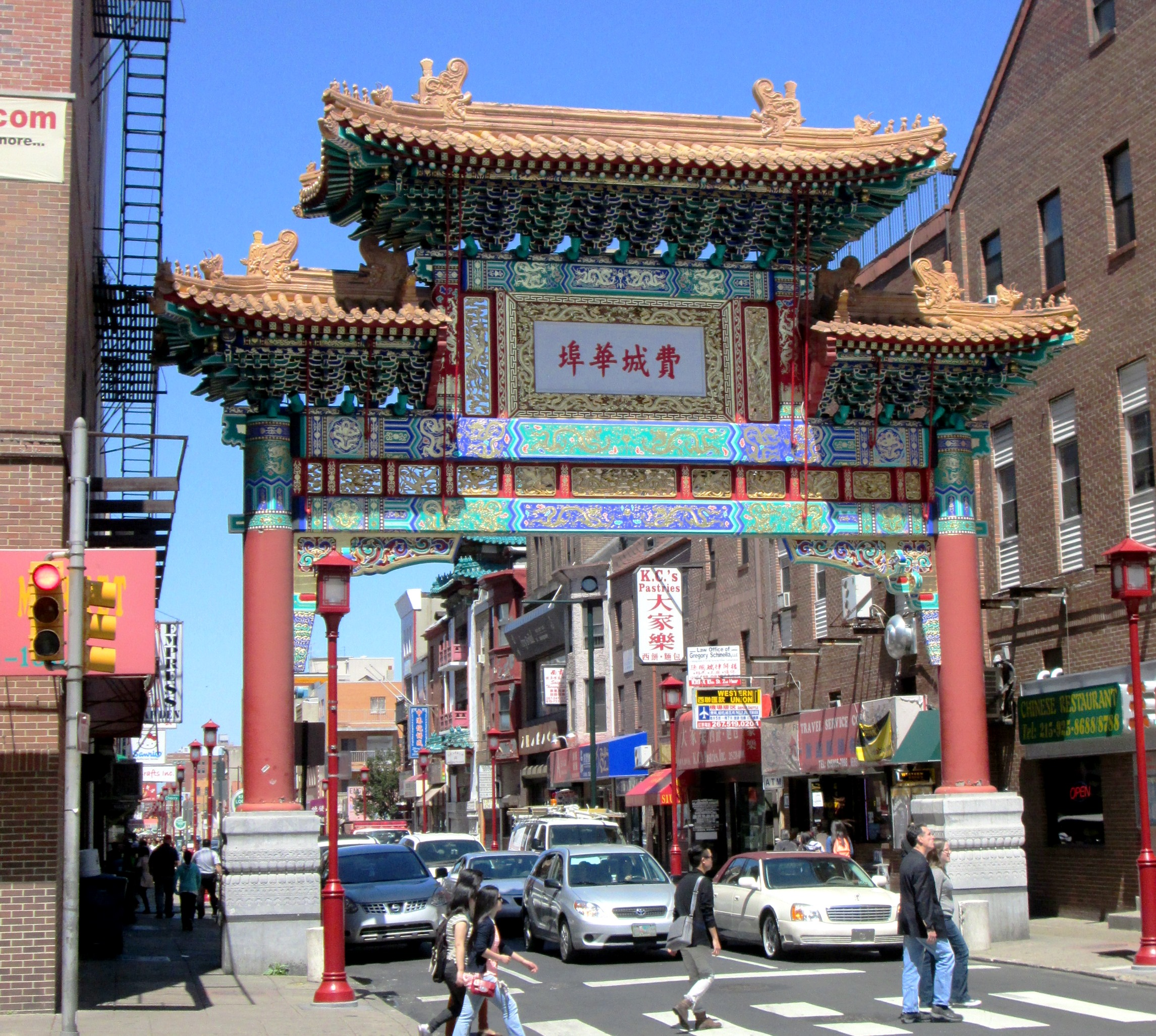
Chinatown, Philadelphia, the recipient of significant Chinese immigration from both New York City and China

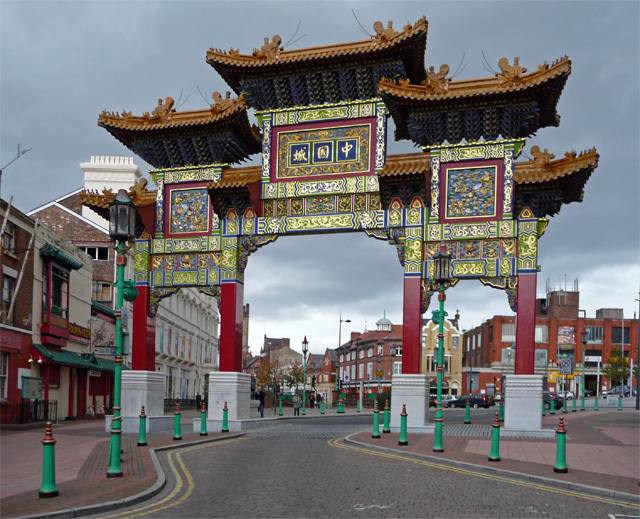
Liverpool's Chinatown, the oldest Chinatown in Europe

=== 1970s to the present ===
By the late 1970s, refugees and exiles from the Vietnam War played a significant part in the redevelopment of Chinatowns in developed Western countries. As a result, many existing Chinatowns have become pan-Asian business districts and residential neighborhoods. By contrast, most Chinatowns in the past had been largely inhabited by Chinese from southeastern China.

In 2001, the events of September 11 resulted in a mass migration of about 14,000 Chinese workers from Manhattan's Chinatown to Montville, Connecticut, due to the fall of the garment industry. Chinese workers transitioned to casino jobs fueled by the development of the Mohegan Sun casino.

In 2012, Tijuana's Chinatown formed as a result of availability of direct flights to China. The La Mesa District of Tijuana was formerly a small enclave, but has tripled in size as a result of direct flights to Shanghai. It has an ethnic Chinese population rise from 5,000 in 2009 to roughly 15,000 in 2012, overtaking Mexicali's Chinatown as the largest Chinese enclave in Mexico.

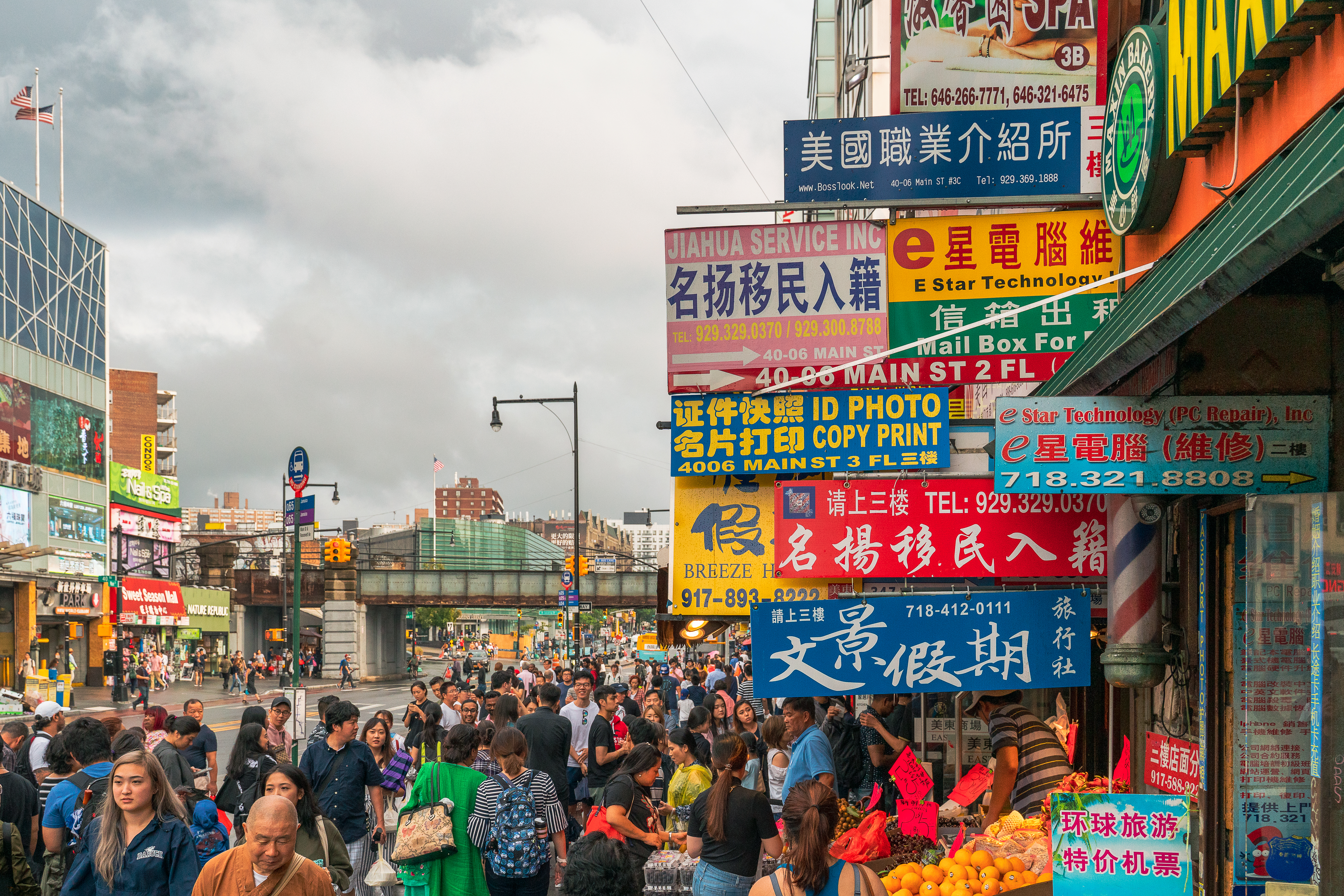
The busy intersection of Main Street and Roosevelt Avenue in the Flushing Chinatown (法拉盛華埠), Downtown Flushing, Queens, New York City, one of the busiest pedestrian intersections in the world. The segment of Main Street between Kissena Boulevard and Roosevelt Avenue, punctuated by the Long Island Rail Road trestle overpass, represents the cultural heart of Flushing Chinatown. Housing over 30,000 individuals born in China alone, the largest by this metric outside Asia, Flushing has become home to the largest and one of the fastest-growing Chinatowns in the world. Flushing is undergoing rapid gentrification by Chinese transnational entities, and the growth of the business activity at the core of Downtown Flushing, dominated by the Flushing Chinatown, has continued despite the Covid-19 pandemic. As of 2023, illegal Chinese immigration to New York City, and especially to the city's Flushing Chinatown, has accelerated.

The New York metropolitan area, consisting of New York City, Long Island, and nearby areas within the states of New York, New Jersey, Connecticut, and Pennsylvania, is home to the largest Chinese-American population of any metropolitan area within the United States and the largest Chinese population outside of China, enumerating an estimated 893,697 in 2017, and including at least 12 Chinatowns, including nine in New York City proper alone. Steady immigration from mainland China, both legal and illegal, has fueled Chinese-American population growth in the New York metropolitan area. New York's status as an alpha global city, its extensive mass transit system, and the New York metropolitan area's enormous economic marketplace are among the many reasons it remains a major international immigration hub. The Manhattan Chinatown contains the largest concentration of ethnic Chinese in the Western Hemisphere, and the Flushing Chinatown in Queens has become one of the world's largest Chinatowns.

The COVID-19 pandemic has adversely affected tourism and business in Chinatown, San Francisco and Chinatown, Chicago, Illinois as well as others worldwide.

== Chinese settlements ==
=== History ===
- People of Fujian province used to move over the South China Sea from the 14th century to look for more stable jobs, in most cases of trading and fishery, and settled down near the port/jetty under approval of the local authority such as Magong (Penghu), Hoian (Vietnam), Songkla (Thailand), Malacca (Malaysia), Banten, Semarang, Tuban (Indonesia), Manila (the Philippines), etc. A large number of this kind of settlements was developed along the coastal areal of the South China Sea, and was called "Campon China" by Portuguese account and "China Town" by English account.

=== Settlement pattern ===
- The settlement was developed along a jetty and protected by Mazu temple, which was dedicated for the Goddess of Sea for safe sailing. Market place was open in front of Mazu temple, and shophouses were built along the street leading from west side of the Mazu temple. At the end of the street, Tudigong (Land God) temple was placed. As the settlement prospered as commercial town, Kuan Ti temple would be added for commercial success, especially by people from Hong Kong and Guangdong province. This core pattern was maintained even the settlement got expanded as a city, and forms historical urban center of the Southeast Asia.
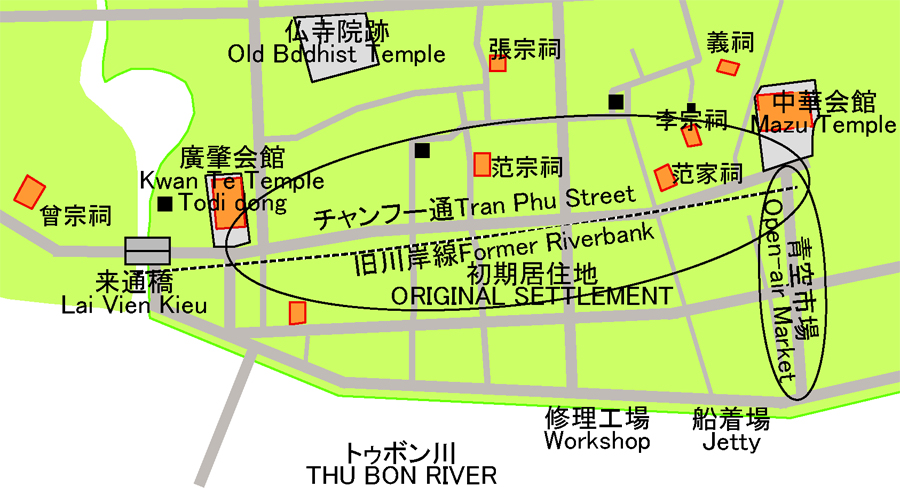
Hoian Settlement Pattern, Vietnam, 1991

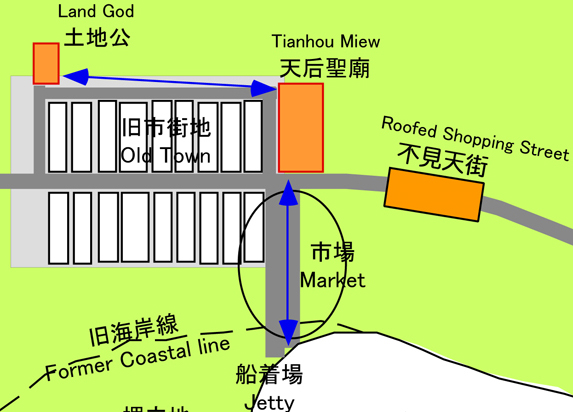
Pengchau Settlement Pattern, Hong Kong, 1991

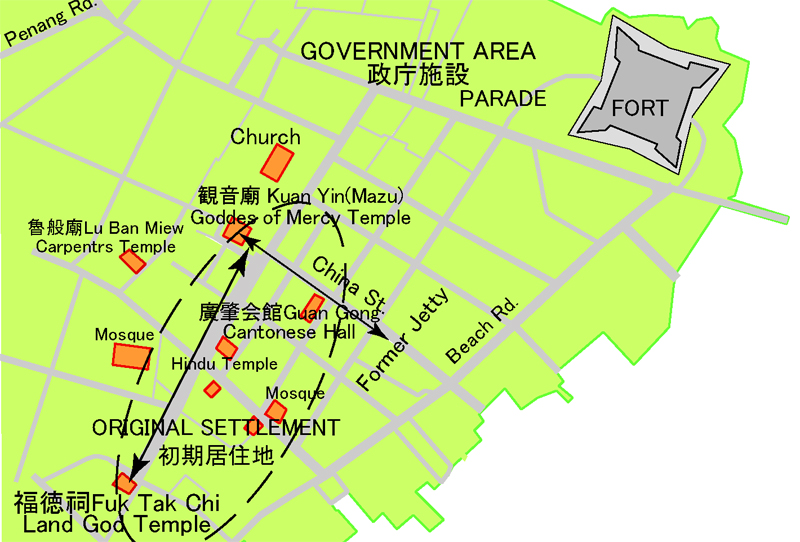
Chinese Settlement in Georgetown, Malaysia, 1991

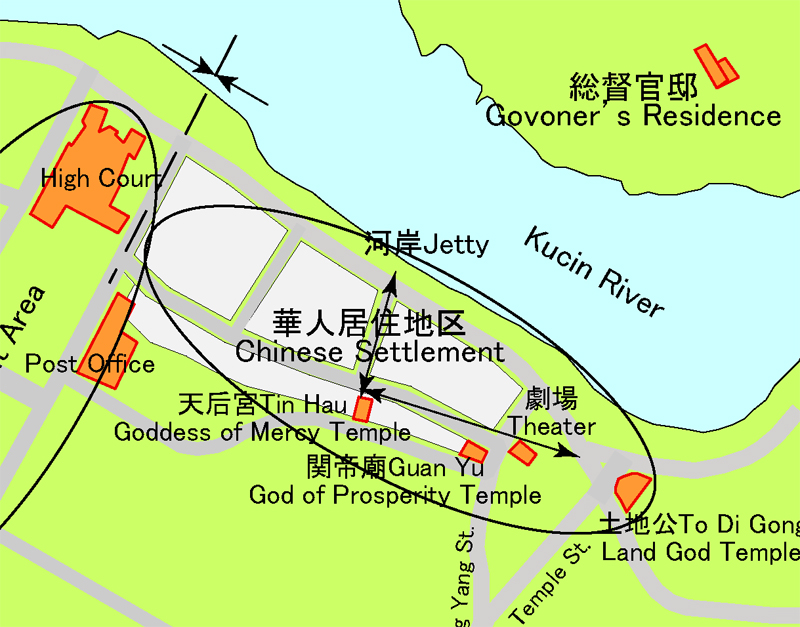
Chinese Settlement in Kuching, Malaysia, 1991

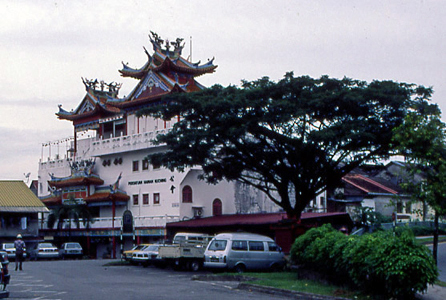
Tin Hau (Goddess of Sea) Temple in Kuching, Malaysia, 1991

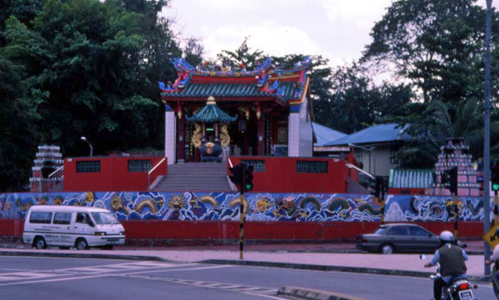
To Di Gong (Land God) Temple at Kuching, 1991

== Characteristics ==
The features described below are characteristic of many modern Chinatowns.

=== Demographics ===
The early Chinatowns such as those in San Francisco and Los Angeles in the United States were naturally destinations for people of Chinese descent as migration were the result of opportunities such as the California Gold Rush and the Transcontinental Railroad drawing the population in, creating natural Chinese enclaves that were almost always 100% exclusively Han Chinese, which included both people born in China and in the enclave, in this case American-born Chinese. In some free countries such as the United States and Canada, housing laws that prevent discrimination also allows neighborhoods that may have been characterized as "All Chinese" to also allow non-Chinese to reside in these communities. For example, the Chinatown in Philadelphia has a sizeable non-Chinese population residing within the community.

A recent study also suggests that the demographic change is also driven by gentrification of what were previously Chinatown neighborhoods. The influx of luxury housing is speeding up the gentrification of such neighborhoods. The trend for emergence of these types of natural enclaves is on the decline (with the exceptions being the continued growth and emergence of newer Chinatowns in Queens and Brooklyn in New York City), only to be replaced by newer "Disneyland-like" attractions, such as a new Chinatown that will be built in the Catskills region of New York. This includes the endangerment of existing historical Chinatowns that will eventually stop serving the needs of Chinese immigrants.

Newer developments like those in Norwich, Connecticut, and the San Gabriel Valley, which are not necessarily considered "Chinatowns" in the sense that they do not necessarily contain the Chinese architectures or Chinese language signs as signatures of an officially sanctioned area that was designated either in law or signage stating so, differentiate areas that are called "Chinatowns" versus locations that have "significant" populations of people of Chinese descent. For example, San Jose, California in the United States has 63,434 people (2010 U.S. Census) of Chinese descent, and yet "does not have a Chinatown". Some "official" Chinatowns have Chinese populations much lower than that.

=== Town-Scape ===
Many tourist-destination metropolitan Chinatowns can be distinguished by large red arch entrance structures known in Mandarin Chinese as Paifang (sometimes accompanied by imperial guardian lion statues on either side of the structure, to greet visitors). Other Chinese architectural styles such as the Chinese Garden of Friendship in Sydney Chinatown and the Chinese stone lions at the gate to the Victoria, British Columbia Chinatown are present in some Chinatowns. Mahale Chiniha, the Chinatown in Iran, contains many buildings that were constructed in the Chinese architectural style.

Paifangs usually have special inscriptions in Chinese. Historically, these gateways were donated to a particular city as a gift from the Republic of China and People's Republic of China, or local governments (such as Chinatown, San Francisco) and business organizations. The long-neglected Chinatown in Havana, Cuba, received materials for its paifang from the People's Republic of China as part of the Chinatown's gradual renaissance. Construction of these red arches is often financed by local financial contributions from the Chinatown community. Some of these structures span an entire intersection, and some are smaller in height and width. Some paifang can be made of wood, masonry or steel and may incorporate an elaborate or simple design.

Chinatown landmarks
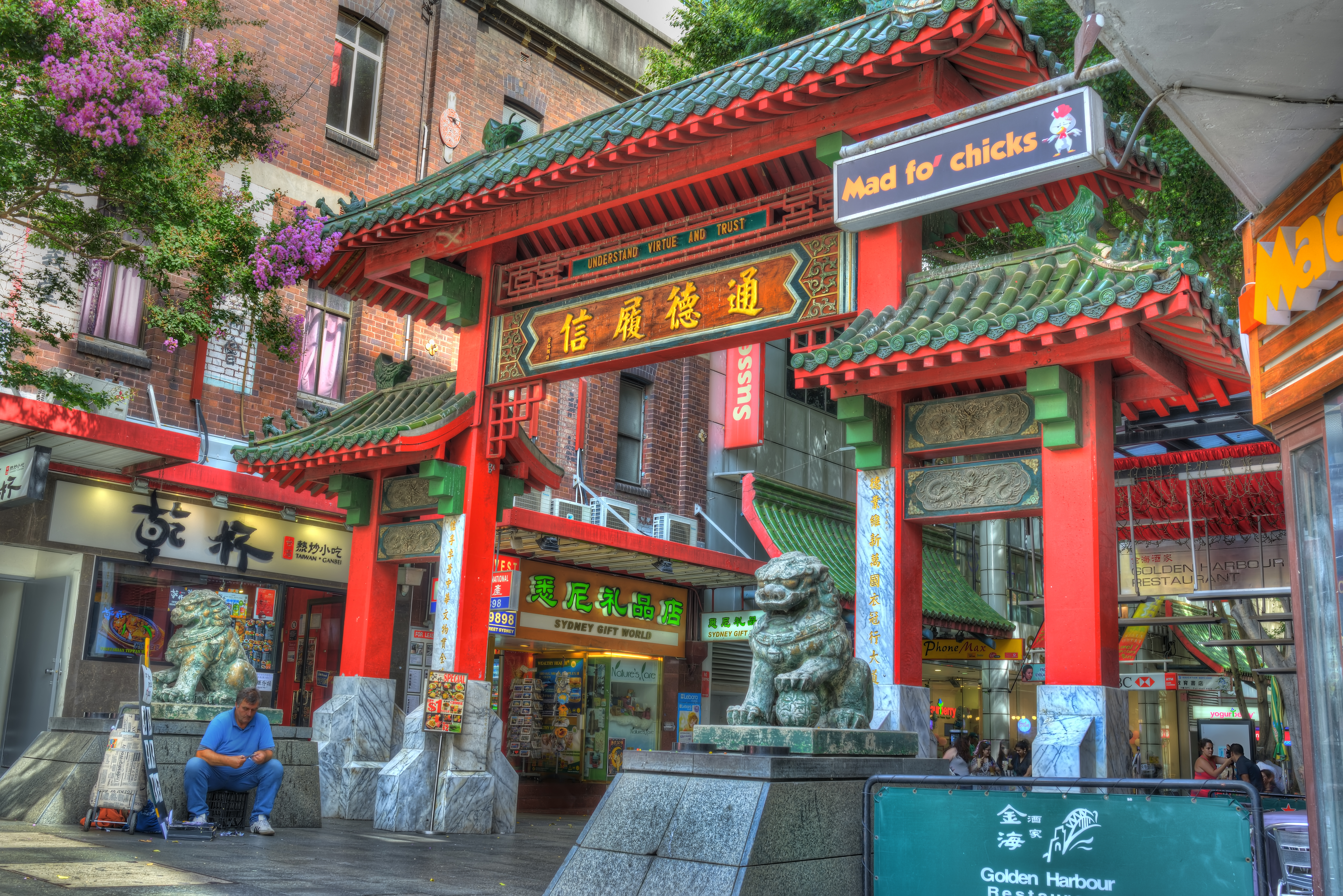
Entrance to Sydney

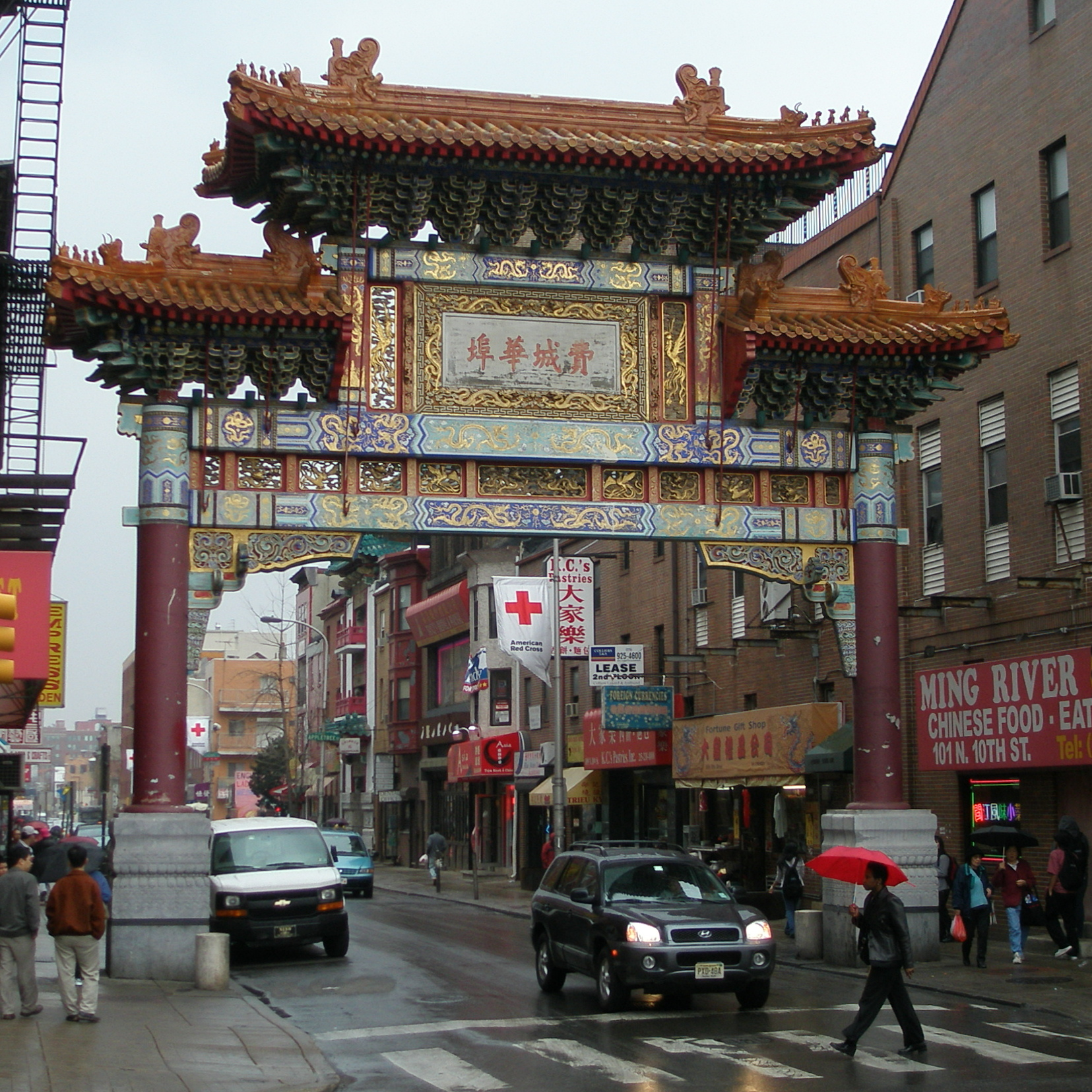
Paifang in Philadelphia

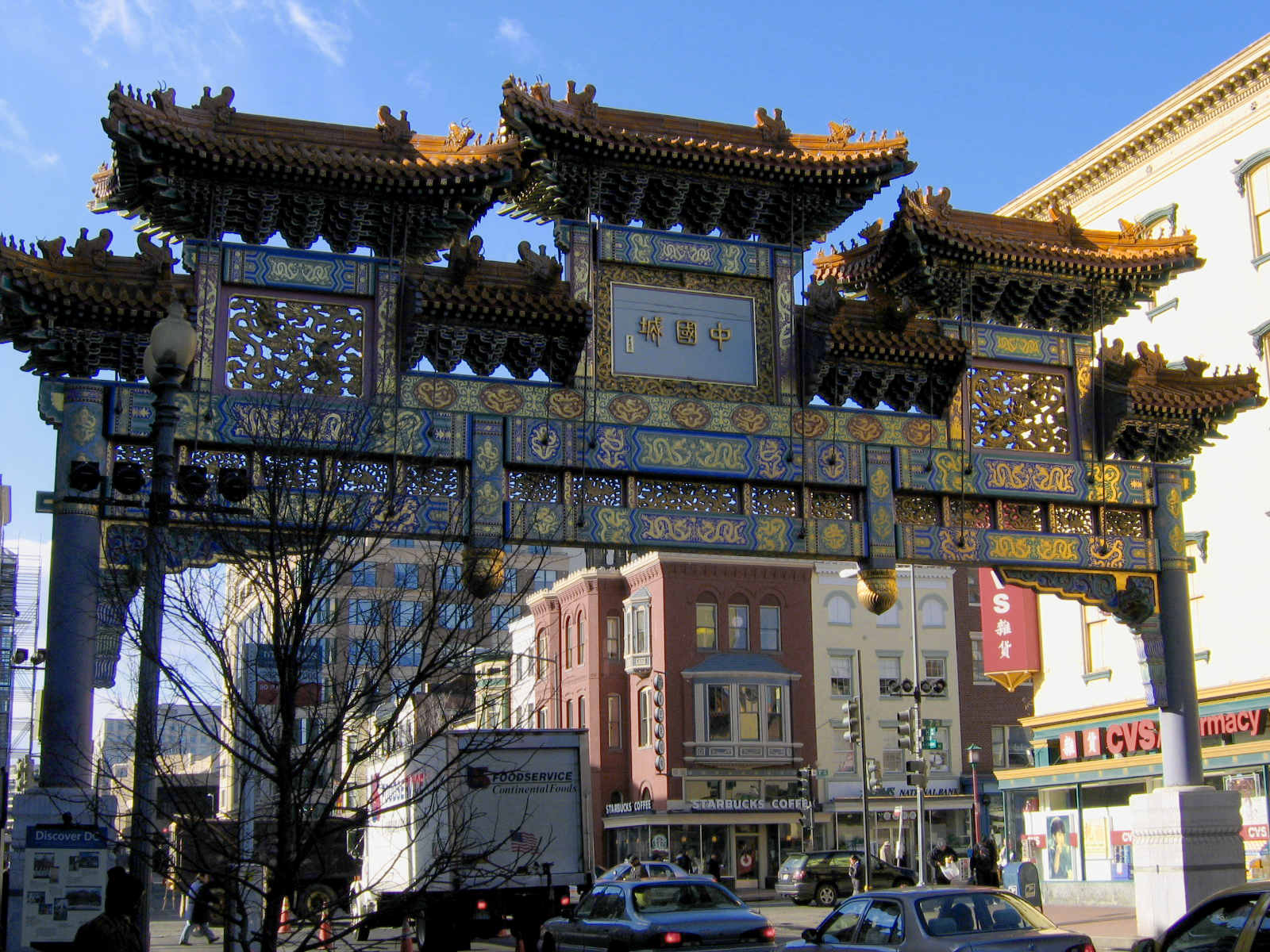
Friendship Archway in the Chinatown of Washington, D.C.

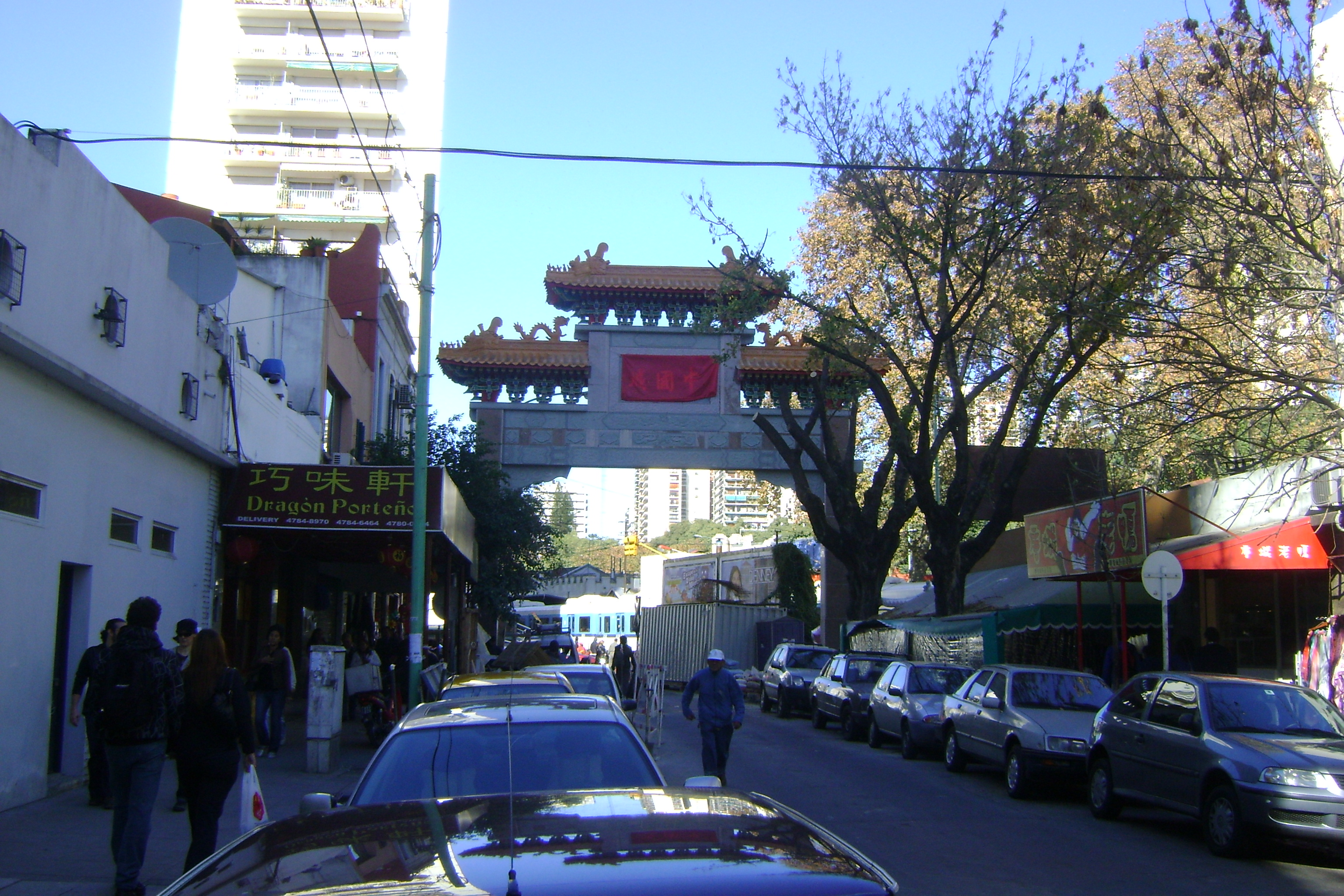
Paifang in Buenos Aires, Argentina

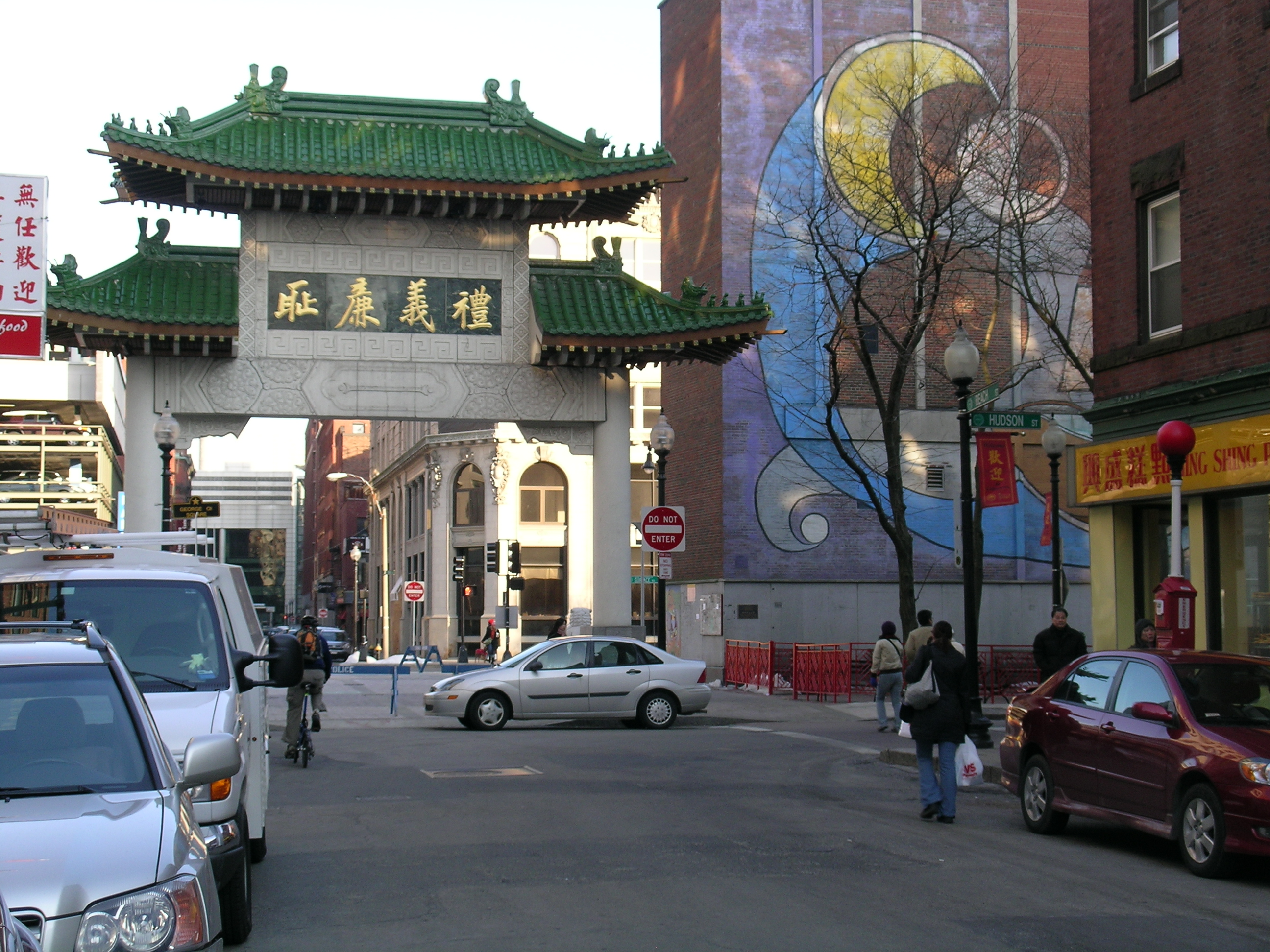
Chinatown, Boston looking towards the paifang

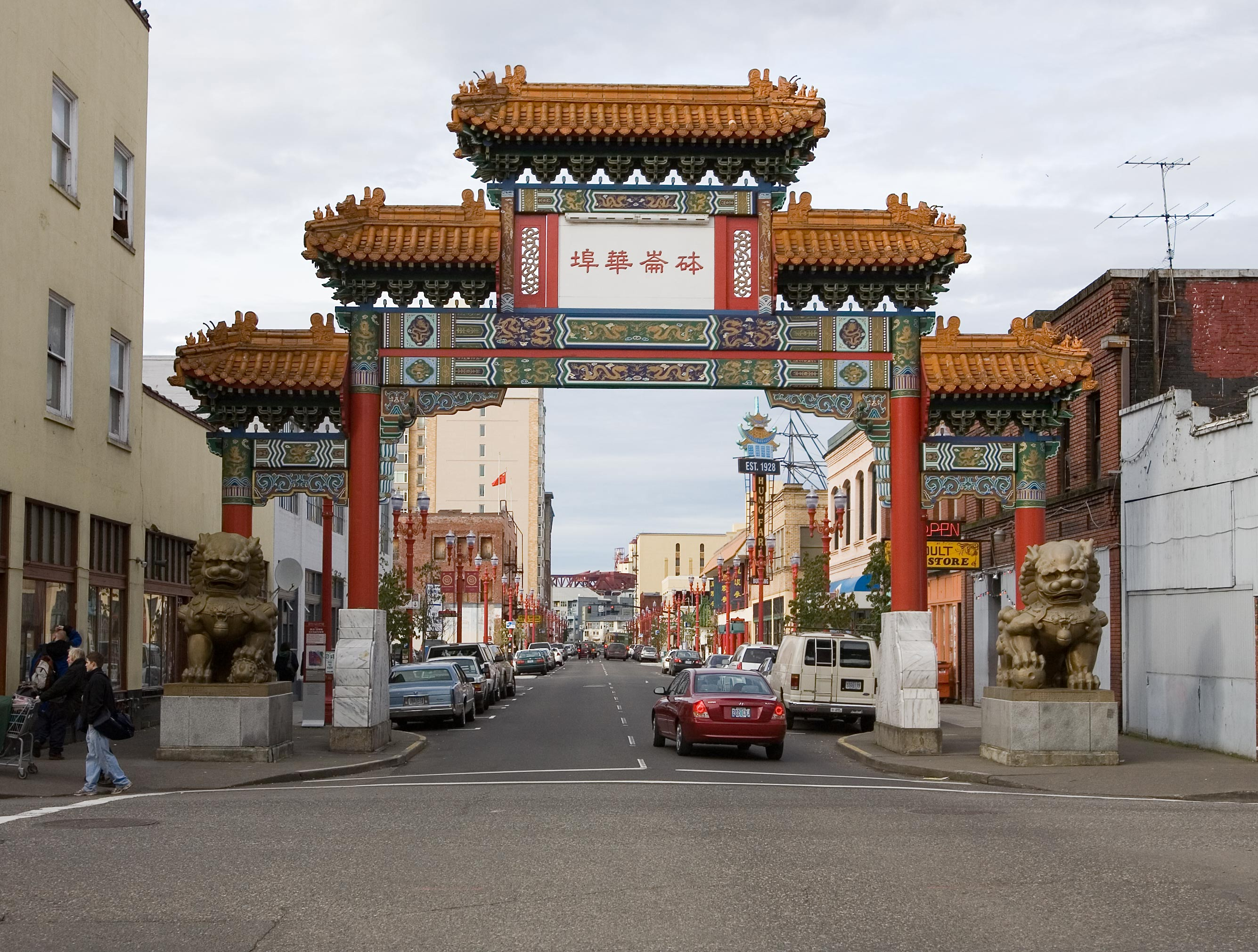
Gate of Chinatown, Portland, Oregon

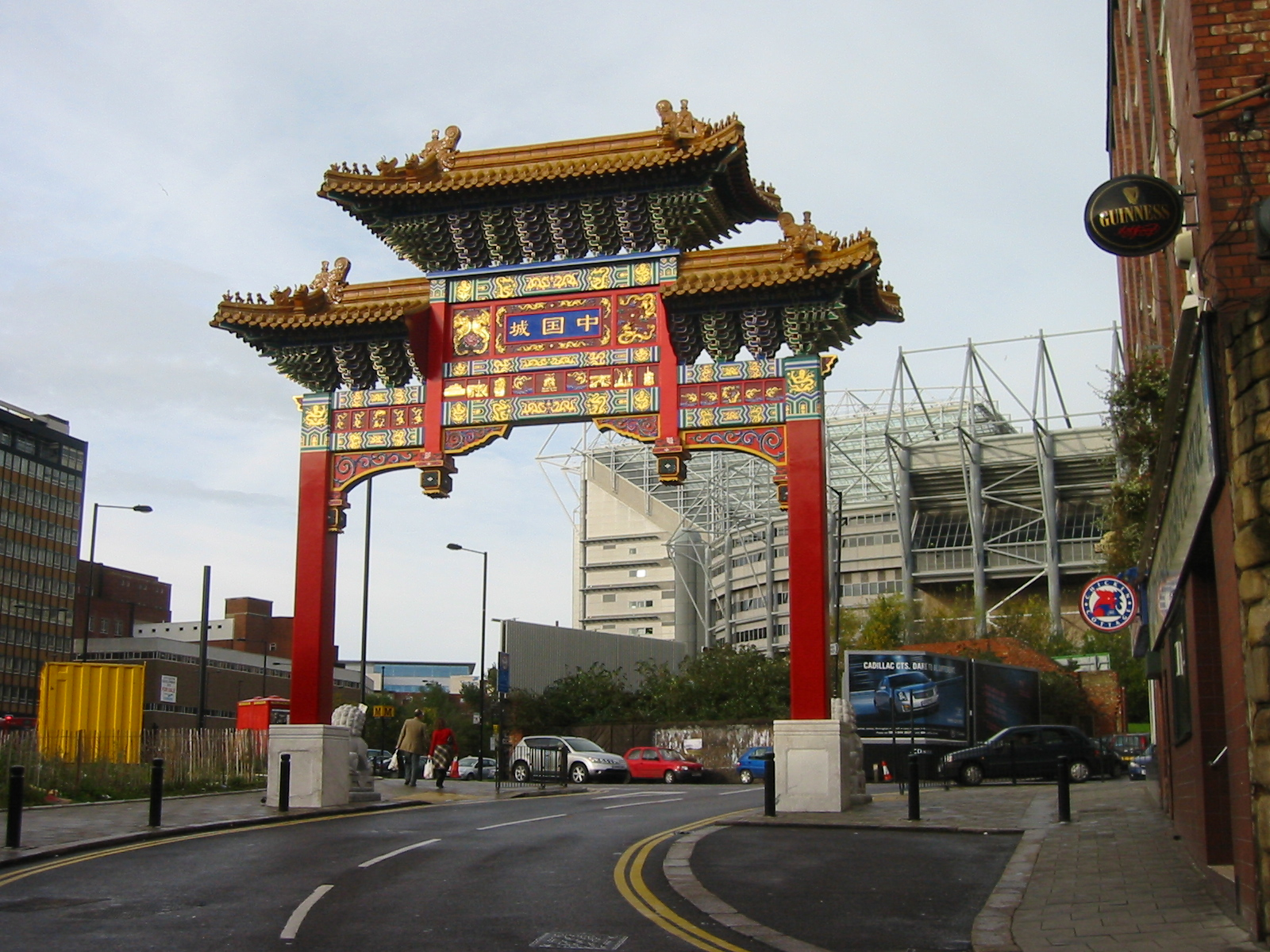
Chinatown entry arch in Newcastle, England

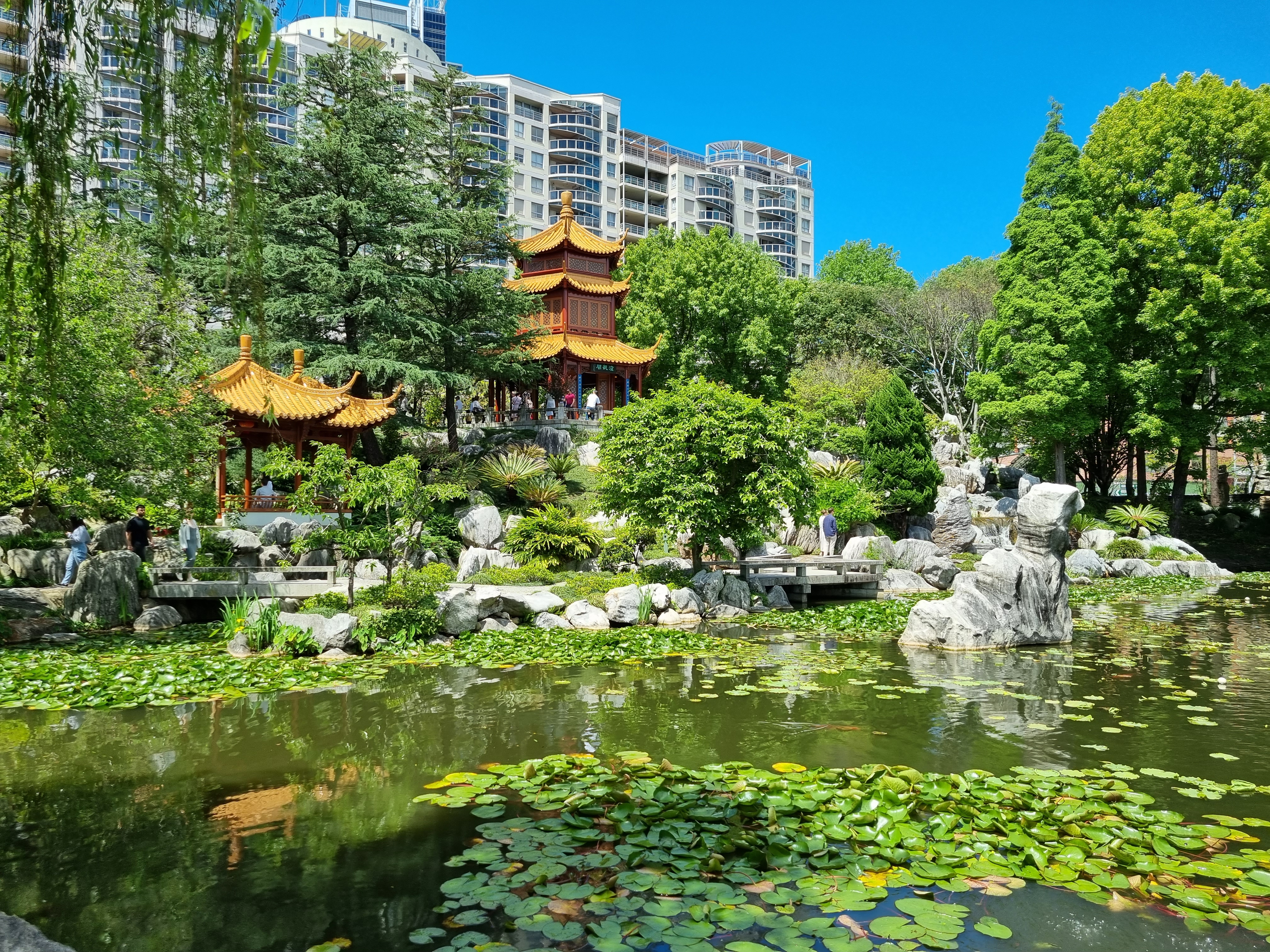
Chinese Garden of Friendship, part of Sydney Chinatown

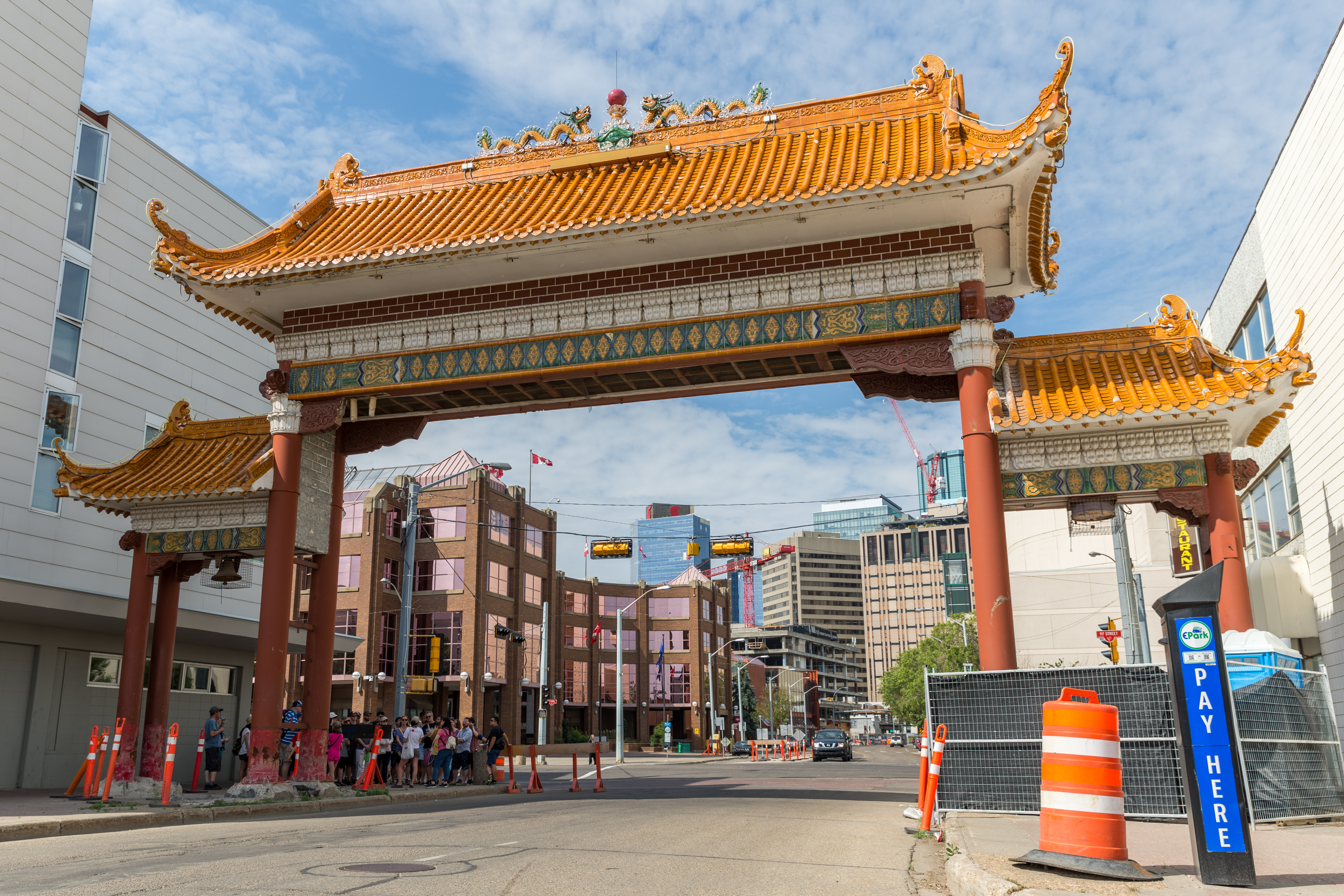
Harbin Gates in Chinatown of Edmonton, Alberta, Canada

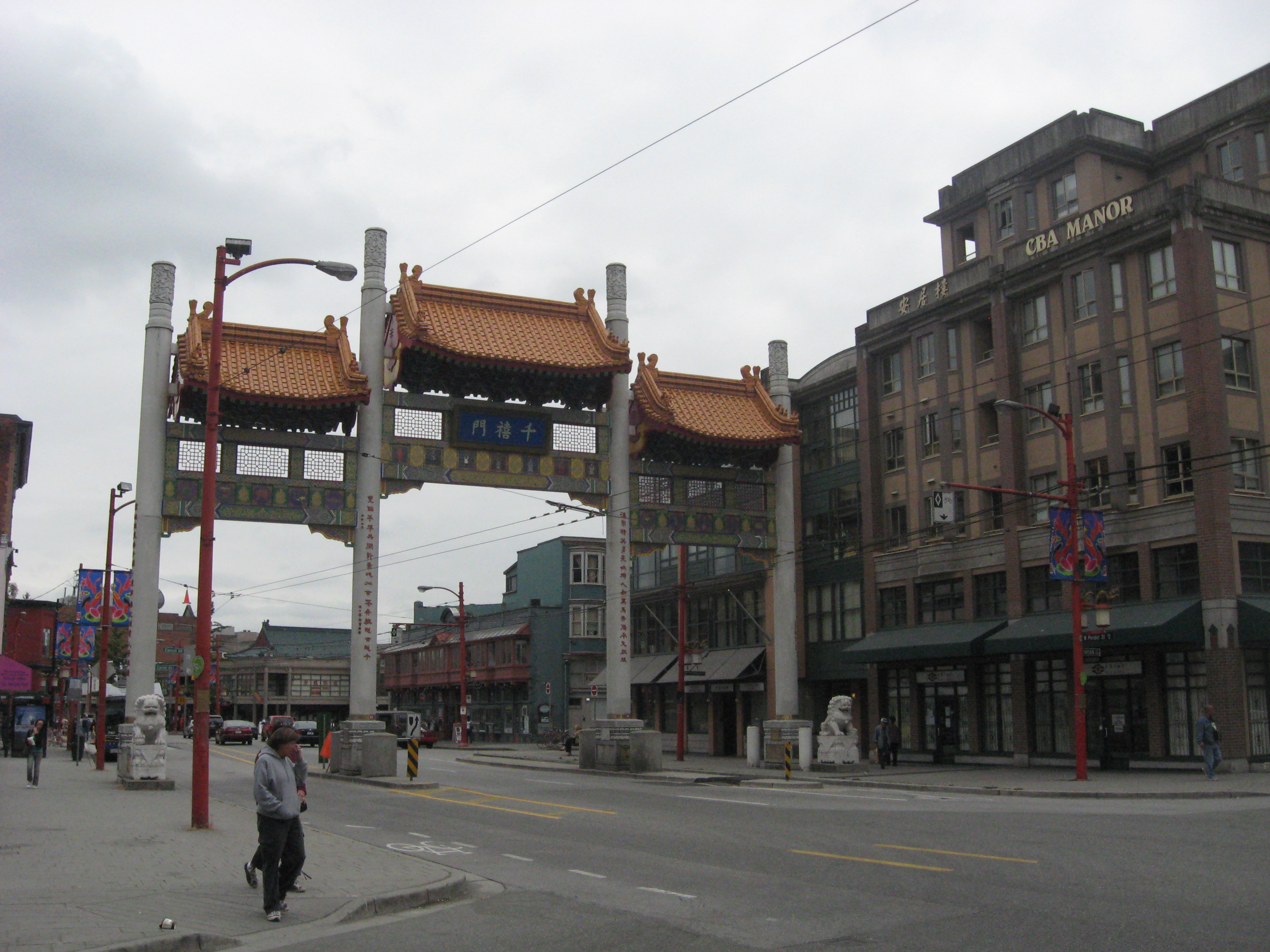
Millennium Gate on Pender Street in Chinatown of Vancouver, British Columbia, Canada

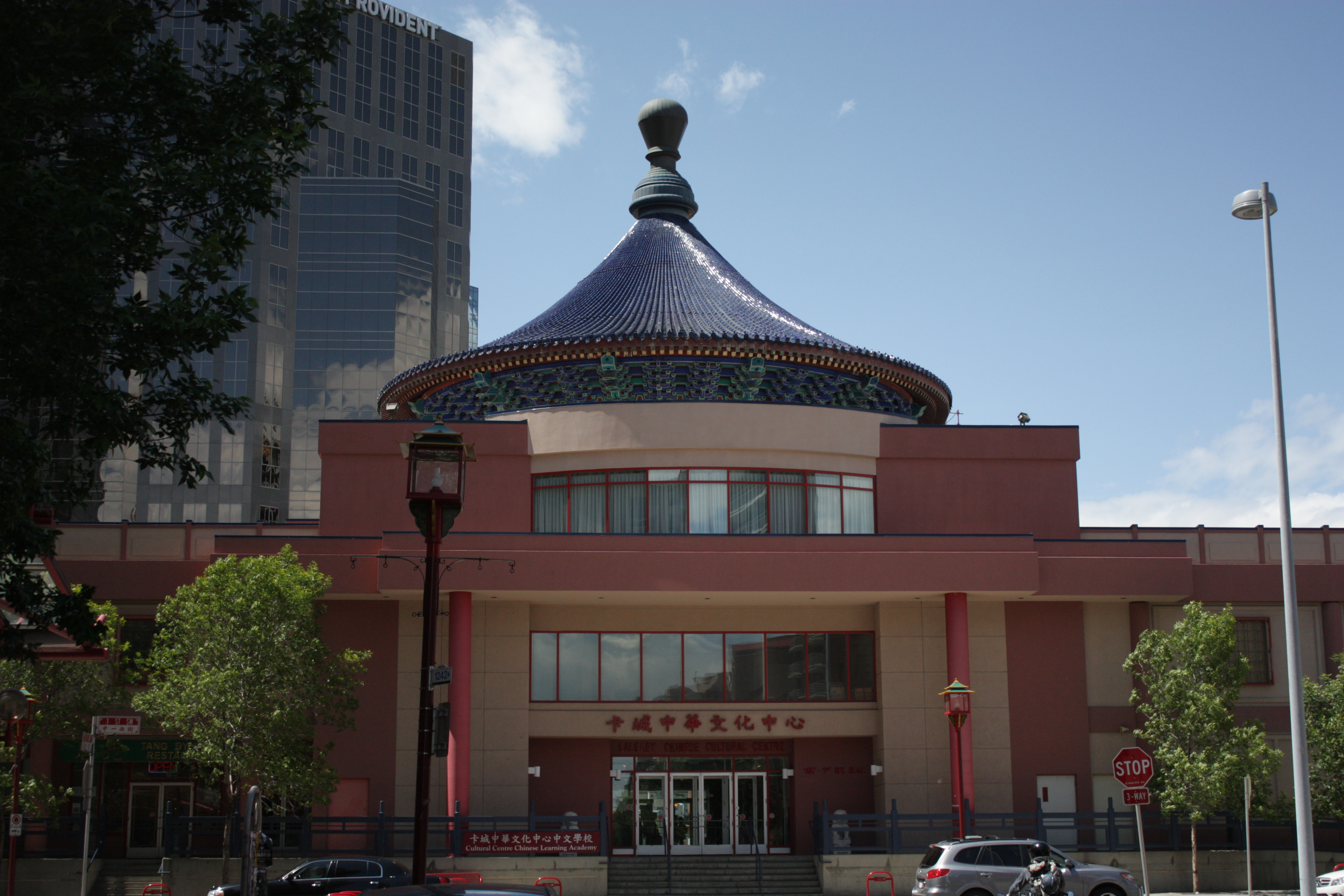
The Chinese Cultural Centre in the Calgary, Alberta, Canada Chinatown

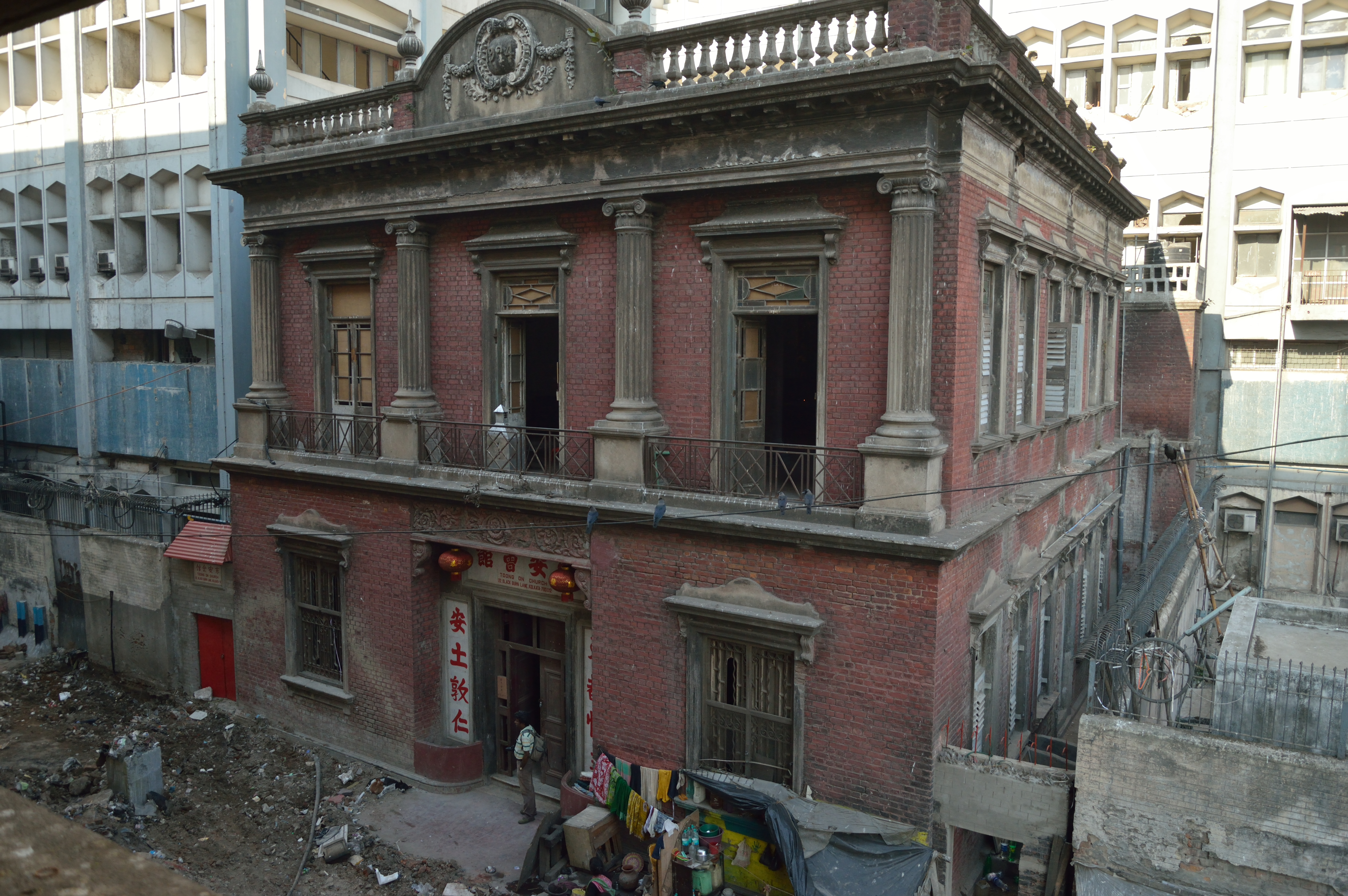
Chinese Temple "Toong On Church" in Kolkata, India.

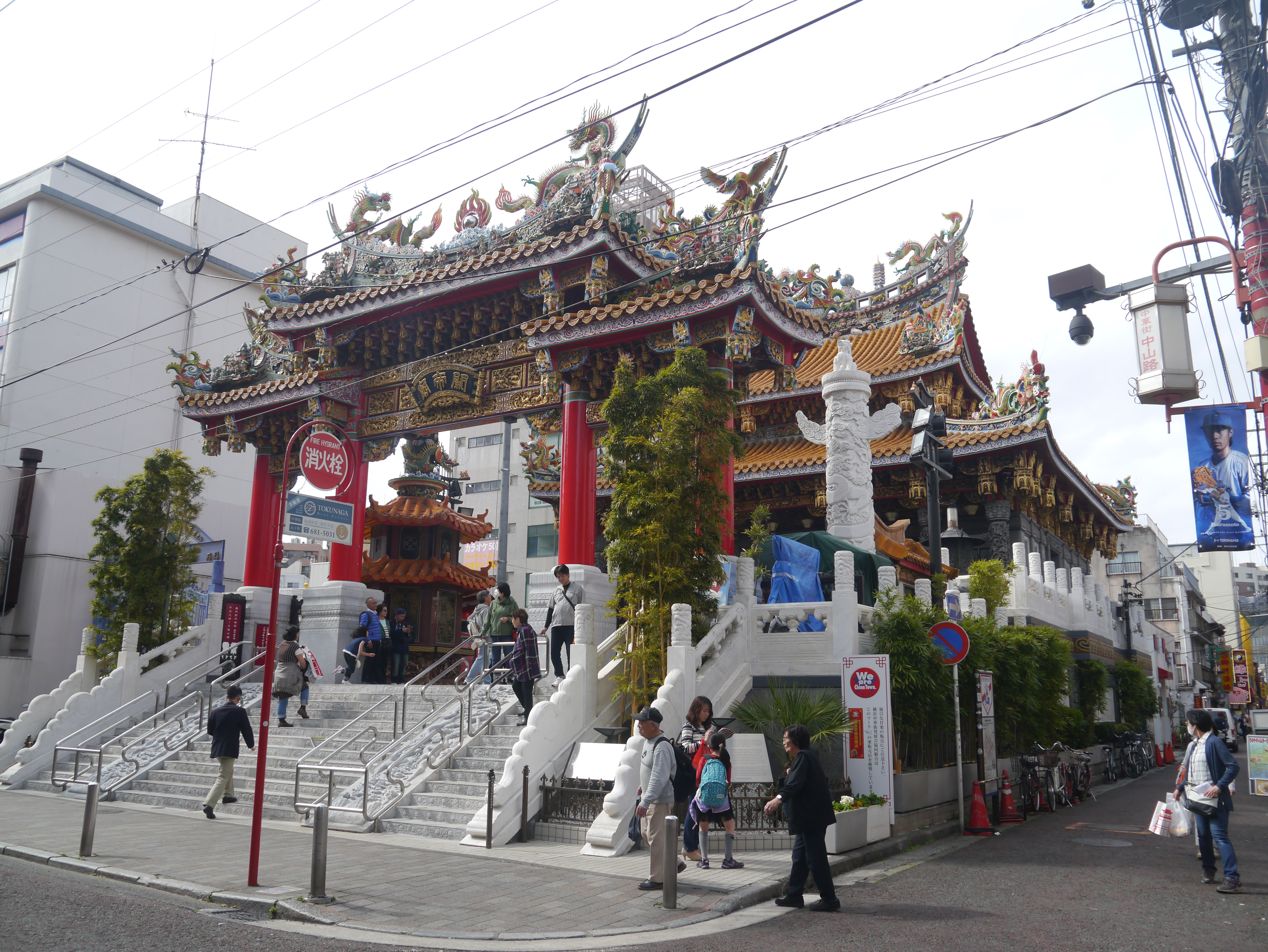
Chinese Temple in Yokohama Chinatown, Japan.

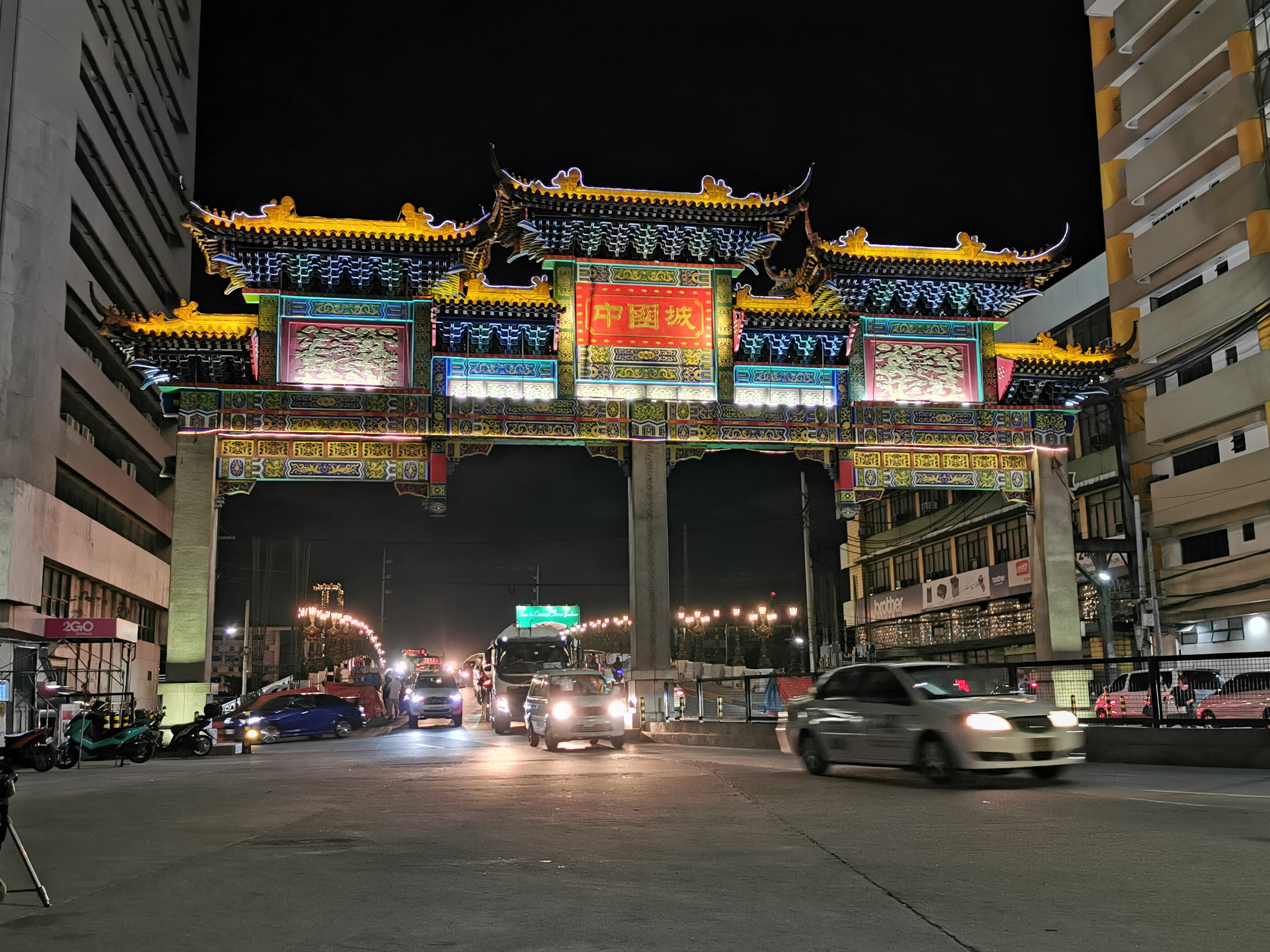
Filipino-Chinese Friendship Arch in Manila

== Benevolent and business associations ==
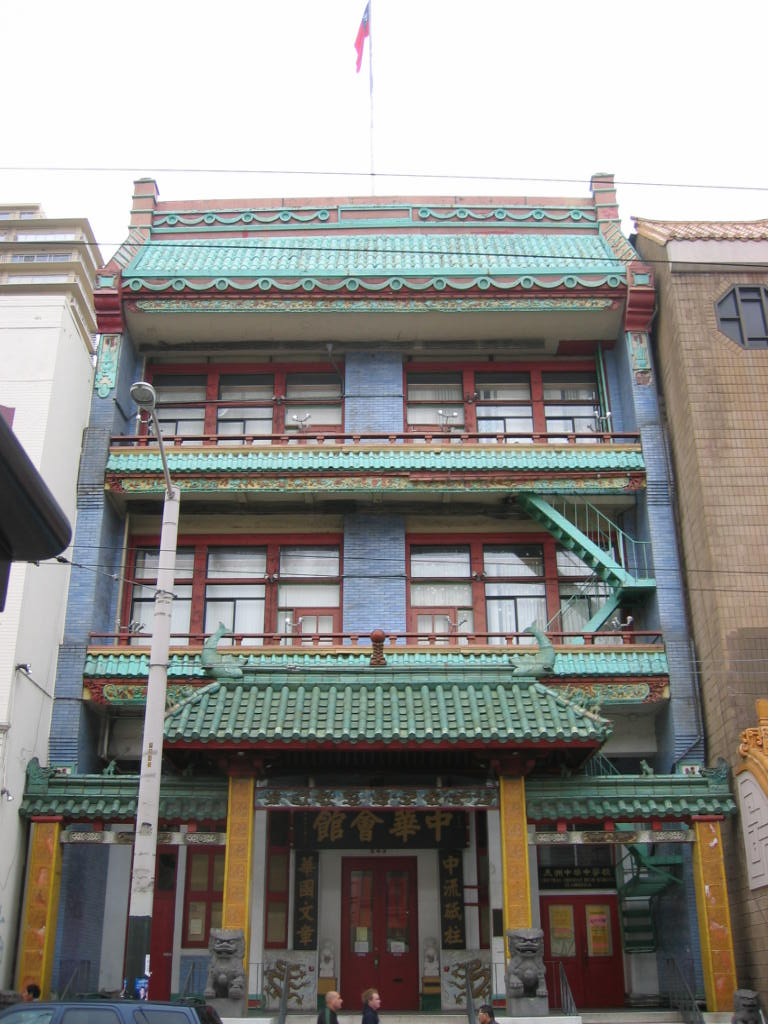
Headquarters of the Chinese Consolidated Benevolent Association in Chinatown, San Francisco

A major component of many Chinatowns is the family benevolent association, which provides some degree of aid to immigrants. These associations generally provide social support, religious services, death benefits (members' names in Chinese are generally enshrined on tablets and posted on walls), meals, and recreational activities for ethnic Chinese, especially for older Chinese migrants. Membership in these associations can be based on members sharing a common Chinese surname or belonging to a common clan, spoken Chinese dialect, specific village, region or country of origin, and so on. Many have their own facilities.

Some examples include San Francisco's prominent Chinese Consolidated Benevolent Association (中華總會館 Zhōnghuá Zǒng Huìguǎn), aka Chinese Six Companies and Los Angeles' Southern California Teochew Association. The Chinese Consolidated Benevolent Association is among the largest umbrella groups of benevolent associations in the North America, which branches in several Chinatowns. Politically, the CCBA has traditionally been aligned with the Kuomintang and the Republic of China.

The London Chinatown Chinese Association is active in Chinatown, London. Chinatown, Paris has an institution in the Association des Résidents en France d'origine indochinoise and it servicing overseas Chinese immigrants in Paris who were born in the former French Indochina.

Traditionally, Chinatown-based associations have also been aligned with ethnic Chinese business interests, such as restaurant, grocery, and laundry (antiquated) associations in Chinatowns in North America. In Chicago's Chinatown, the On Leong Merchants Association was active.

== Names ==
=== English ===
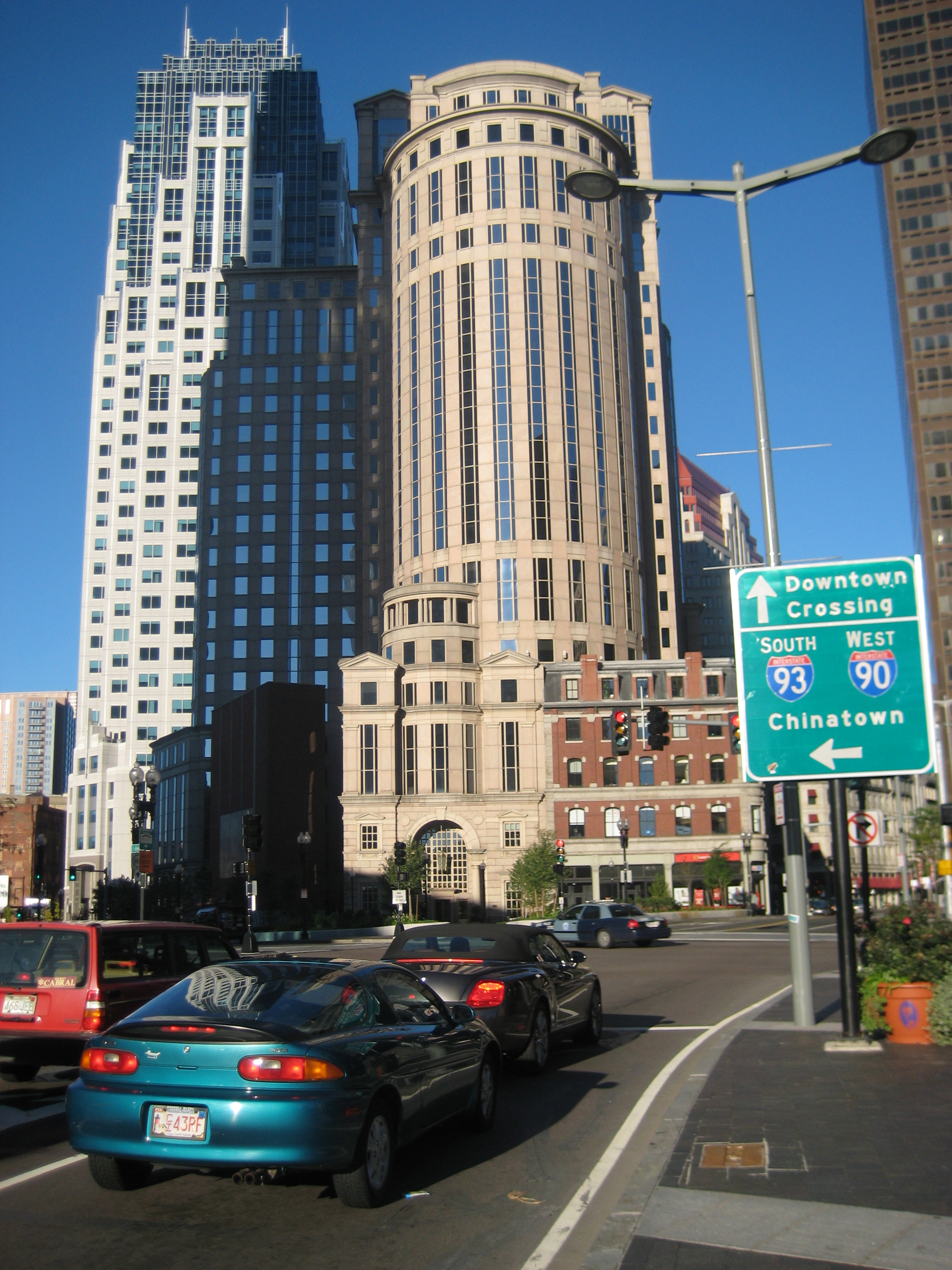
Official signs in Boston pointing towards "Chinatown"

"Chinatown" is the most common name in the English language today, but several alternate English names for Chinatown include China Town (generally used in British and Australian English), The Chinese District, Chinese Quarter, Little Canton, Little China, and China Alley (an antiquated term used primarily in several rural towns in the western United States for a Chinese community; some of these are now historical sites). In the case of Lillooet, British Columbia, Canada, China Alley was a parallel commercial street adjacent to the town's Main Street, enjoying a view over the river valley adjacent and also over the main residential part of Chinatown, which was largely of adobe construction. All traces of Chinatown and China Alley there have disappeared, despite a once large and prosperous community.

The earliest known use of the term "Chinatown" dates back to 1606, though it would not become widely used until centuries later. Its modern usage appears to have emerged in connection with the Chinese quarter of Singapore, which by 1844 was being called "China Town" or "Chinatown" by the British colonial government. This may have been a word-for-word translation into English of the Malay name for that quarter, which in those days was probably "Kampong China" or possibly "Kota China" or "Kampong Tionghua/Chunghwa/Zhonghua".

The first modern appearance of the term "Chinatown" outside Singapore may have been in 1852, in a book by the Rev. Hatfield, who applied the term to the Chinese part of the main settlement on the remote South Atlantic island of St. Helena. The island was a regular way-station on the voyage to Europe and North America from Indian Ocean ports, including Singapore. Chinatowns in the United States were initially called "China Quarter", or "Little Canton" because most Chinese immigrants were Taishanese people from Guangdong province. "Little Canton" was also used in Australia and Mexico.

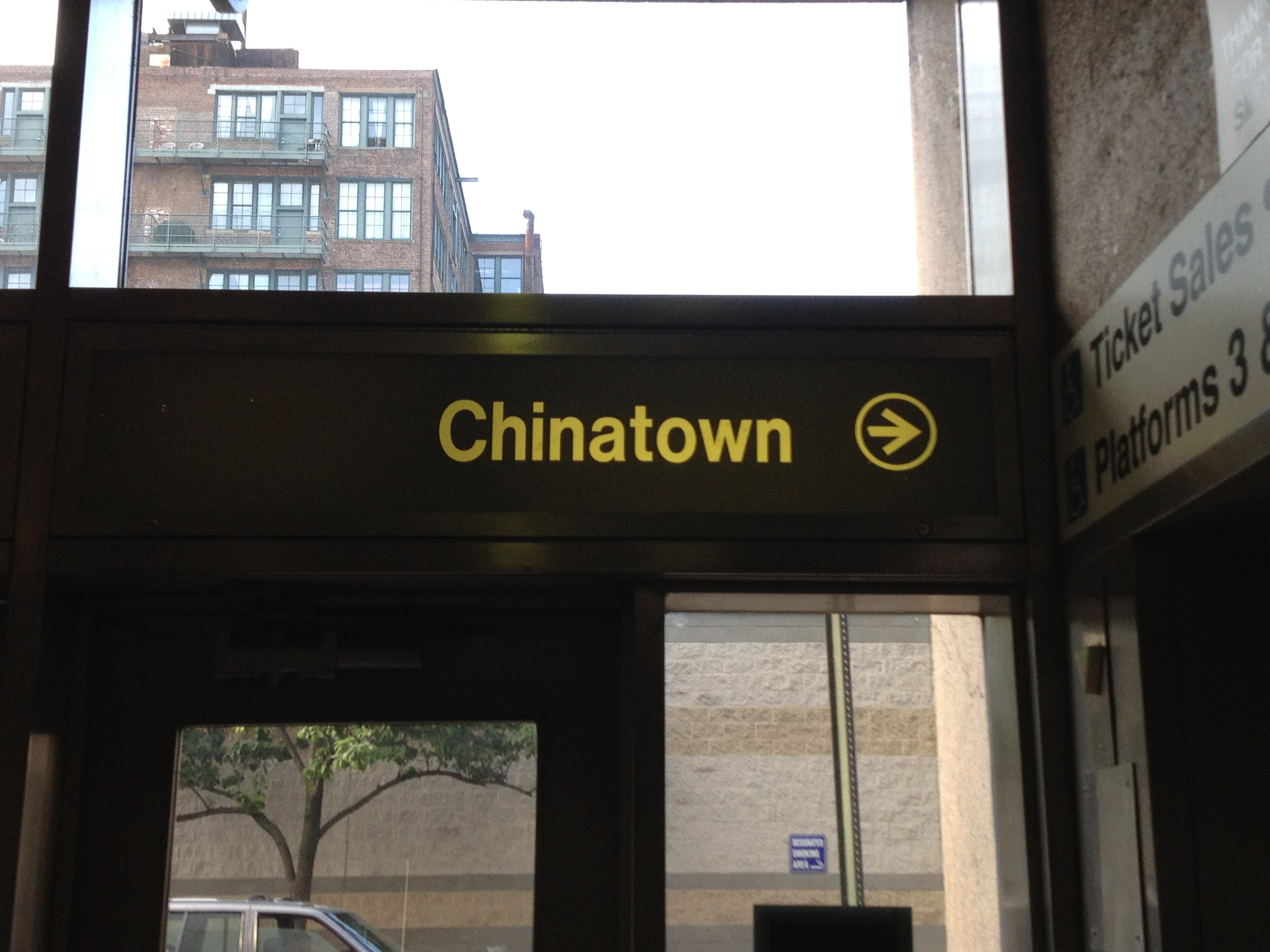
Sign inside Jefferson Station in Philadelphia pointing to "Chinatown"

Inspired by its use in St. Helena, the term "Chinatown" was popularized in the United States by the San Francisco press beginning in 1853. One of the earliest American usages dates to 1855, when San Francisco newspaper The Daily Alta California described a "pitched battle on the streets of [SF's] Chinatown". Other Alta articles from the late 1850s make it clear that areas called "Chinatown" existed at that time in several other California cities, including Oroville and San Andres. By 1869, "Chinatown had acquired its full modern meaning all over the U.S. and Canada. For instance, an Ohio newspaper wrote: "From San Diego to Sitka..., every town and hamlet has its 'Chinatown'."

In British publications before the 1890s, "Chinatown" appeared mainly in connection with California. At first, Australian and New Zealand journalists also regarded Chinatowns as Californian phenomena. However, they began using the term to denote local Chinese communities as early as 1861 in Australia and 1873 in New Zealand. In most other countries, the custom of calling local Chinese communities "Chinatowns" is not older than the twentieth century.

=== In Chinese ===
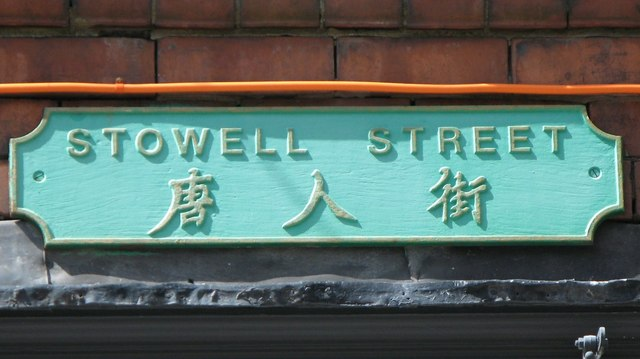
Street sign in Chinatown, Newcastle, with 唐人街 below the street name

In Chinese, Chinatown is usually called 唐人街, in Cantonese Tong jan gai, in Mandarin Tángrénjiē, in Hakka Tong ngin gai, and in Taishanese Hong ngin gai, literally meaning "Tang people's street(s)". The Tang dynasty was a zenith of the Chinese civilization, after which some Chinese call themselves. Some Chinatowns are indeed just one single street, such as the relatively short Fisgard Street in Victoria, British Columbia, Canada.

A more modern Chinese name is 華埠 (Cantonese: Waa Fau, Mandarin: Huábù) meaning "Chinese City", used in the semi-official Chinese translations of some cities' documents and signs. Bù, pronounced sometimes in Mandarin as fù, usually means seaport; but in this sense, it means city or town. Tong jan fau (唐人埠 "Tang people's town") is also used in Cantonese nowadays. The literal word-for-word translation of Chinatown—Zhōngguó Chéng (中國城) is also used, but more frequently by visiting Chinese nationals rather than immigrants of Chinese descent who live in various Chinatowns.

Chinatowns in Southeast Asia have unique Chinese names used by the local Chinese, as there are large populations of people who are Overseas Chinese, living within the various major cities of Southeast Asia. As the population of Overseas Chinese, is widely dispersed in various enclaves, across each major Southeast Asian city, specific Chinese names are used instead.

For example, in Singapore, where 2.8 million ethnic Chinese constitute a majority 74% of the resident population, the Chinese name for Chinatown is Niúchēshǔi (牛車水, Hokkien POJ: Gû-chia-chúi), which literally means "ox-cart water" from the Malay 'Kreta Ayer' in reference to the water carts that used to ply the area. The Chinatown in Kuala Lumpur, Malaysia, (where 2 million ethnic Chinese comprise 30% of the population of Greater Kuala Lumpur) while officially known as Petaling Street (Malay: Jalan Petaling), is referred to by Malaysian Chinese by its Cantonese name ci^{4} cong^{2} gaai^{1} (茨廠街, pinyin: Cíchǎng Jiē), literally "tapioca factory street", after a tapioca starch factory that once stood in the area. In Manila, Philippines, the area is called Mínlúnluò Qū 岷倫洛區, literally meaning the "Mín and Luò Rivers confluence district" but is actually a transliteration of the local term Binondo and an allusion to its proximity to the Pasig River.

=== Other languages ===
In Philippine Spanish, the term used for Chinatown districts is parián, a Spanish term derived from Cebuano parian ("market", "bazaar", or "trading place"). In the rest of the Spanish Empire, the Spanish-language term is usually barrio chino (Chinese neighborhood; plural: barrios chinos), used in Spain and Latin America. (However, barrio chino or its Catalan cognate barri xinès do not always refer to a Chinese neighborhood: these are also common terms for a disreputable district with drugs and prostitution, and often no connection to the Chinese.).

In Portuguese, Chinatown is often referred to as Bairro chinês (the Chinese Neighbourhood; plural: bairros chineses).

In Francophone regions (such as France and Quebec), Chinatown is often referred to as le quartier chinois (the Chinese Neighbourhood; plural: les quartiers chinois). The most prominent Francophone Chinatowns are located in Paris (usually referred to as the Quartier asiatique, literally Asian Quarter due to its diverse ethnic makeup of ethnic Chinese, Vietnamese, Laotian, and Cambodian populations) and Montreal.

The Vietnamese term for Chinatown is Khu người Hoa (Chinese district) or phố Tàu (Chinese street). Vietnamese language is prevalent in Chinatowns of Paris, Los Angeles, Boston, Philadelphia, Toronto, and Montreal as ethnic Chinese from Vietnam have set up shop in them.

In Japanese, the term "chūkagai" (中華街, literally "Chinese Street") is the translation used for Yokohama and Nagasaki Chinatown.

In Indonesia, Chinatown is known as Pecinan, a shortened term of pe-cina-an, means everything related to the Chinese people. Most of these pecinans are usually located in Java.

Some languages have adopted the English-language term, such as Dutch and German.

== Locations ==
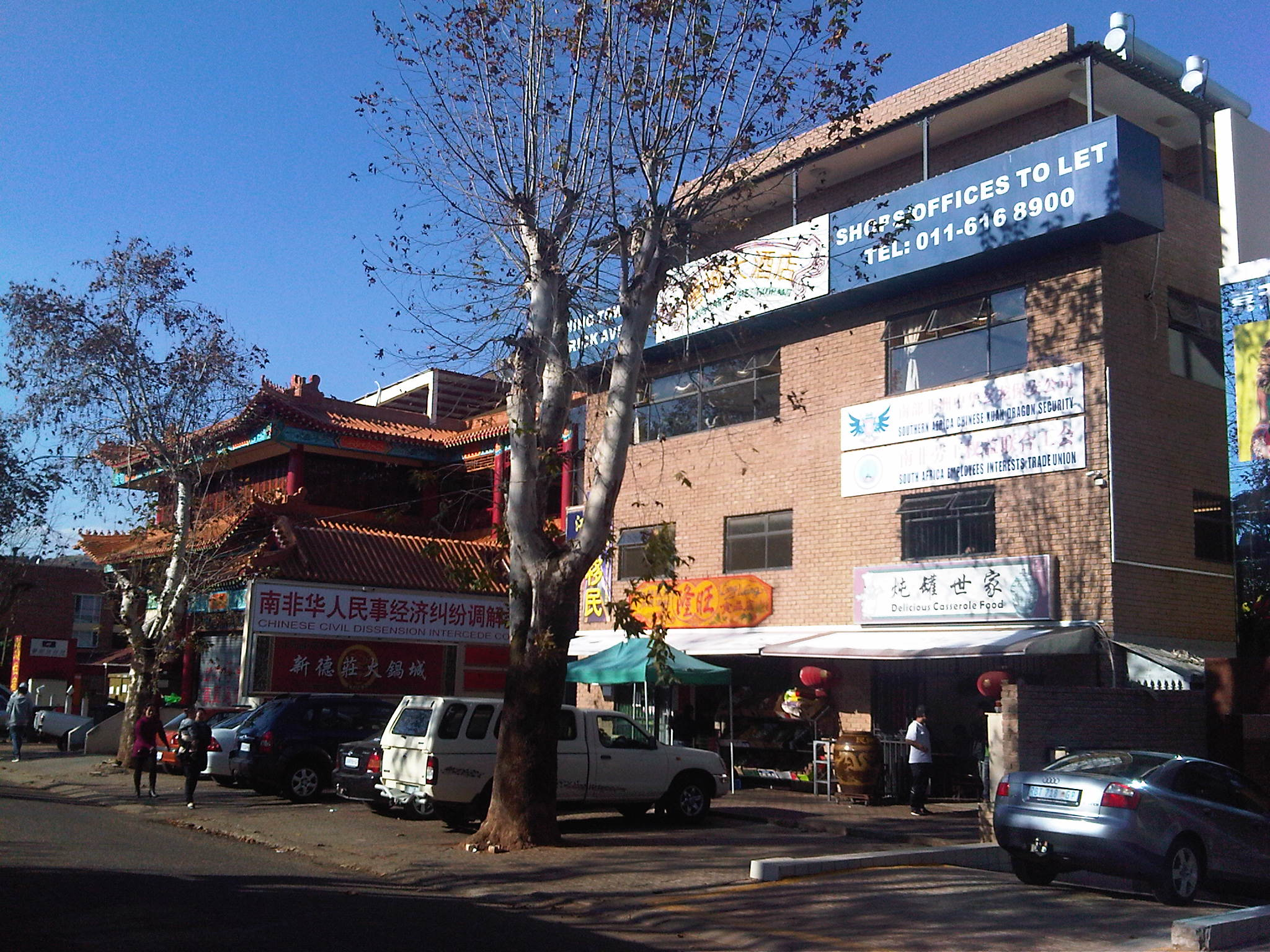
Street scene of the Chinatown in Cyrildene, Johannesburg

=== Africa ===
There are three noteworthy Chinatowns in Africa located in the coastal African nations of Madagascar, Mauritius and South Africa. South Africa has the largest Chinatown and the largest Chinese population of any African country and remains a popular destination for Chinese immigrants coming to Africa. Derrick Avenue in Cyrildene, Johannesburg, hosts South Africa's largest Chinatown.

=== America ===
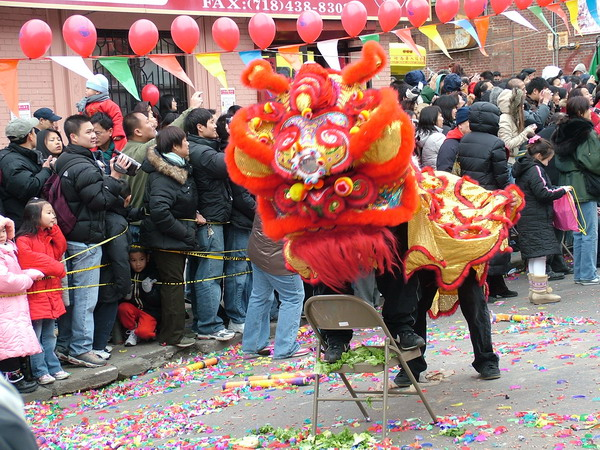
Celebrating Chinese New Year in Fuzhou Town, Brooklyn

In the Americas, which includes North America, Central America and South America, Chinatowns have been around since the 1800s. The most prominent ones exist in the United States and Canada in New York, Boston, San Francisco, Chicago, Toronto and Vancouver. The New York City metropolitan area is home to the largest ethnically Chinese population outside of Asia, comprising an estimated 893,697 uniracial individuals as of 2017, including at least 12 Chinatowns – six (or nine, including the emerging Chinatowns in Corona and Whitestone, Queens, and East Harlem, Manhattan) in New York City proper, and one each in Nassau County, Long Island; Edison, New Jersey; and Parsippany-Troy Hills, New Jersey, not to mention fledgling ethnic Chinese enclaves emerging throughout the New York City metropolitan area. San Francisco, a Pacific port city, has the oldest and longest continuous running Chinatown in the Western Hemisphere. In Canada, The Greater Toronto and Hamilton Area is home to the 2nd largest ethnically Chinese population outside of Asia, comprising 694,970 individuals as of the 2021 Census. Vancouver's Chinatown is the country's largest.

The oldest Chinatown in the Americas is in Mexico City and dates back to at least the early 17th century. Since the 1970s, new arrivals have typically hailed from Hong Kong, Macau, and Taiwan. Latin American Chinatowns may include the descendants of original migrants – often of mixed Chinese and Latin parentage – and more recent immigrants from East Asia. Most Asian Latin Americans are of Cantonese and Hakka origin. Estimates widely vary on the number of Chinese descendants in Latin America. Another notable Chinatown also exists in Lima, Peru.

In Brazil, the Liberdade neighborhood in São Paulo has, along with a large Japanese community, an important Chinese community. There is a project for a Chinatown in the Mercado neighborhood, close to the Municipal Market and the commercial Rua 25 de Março.

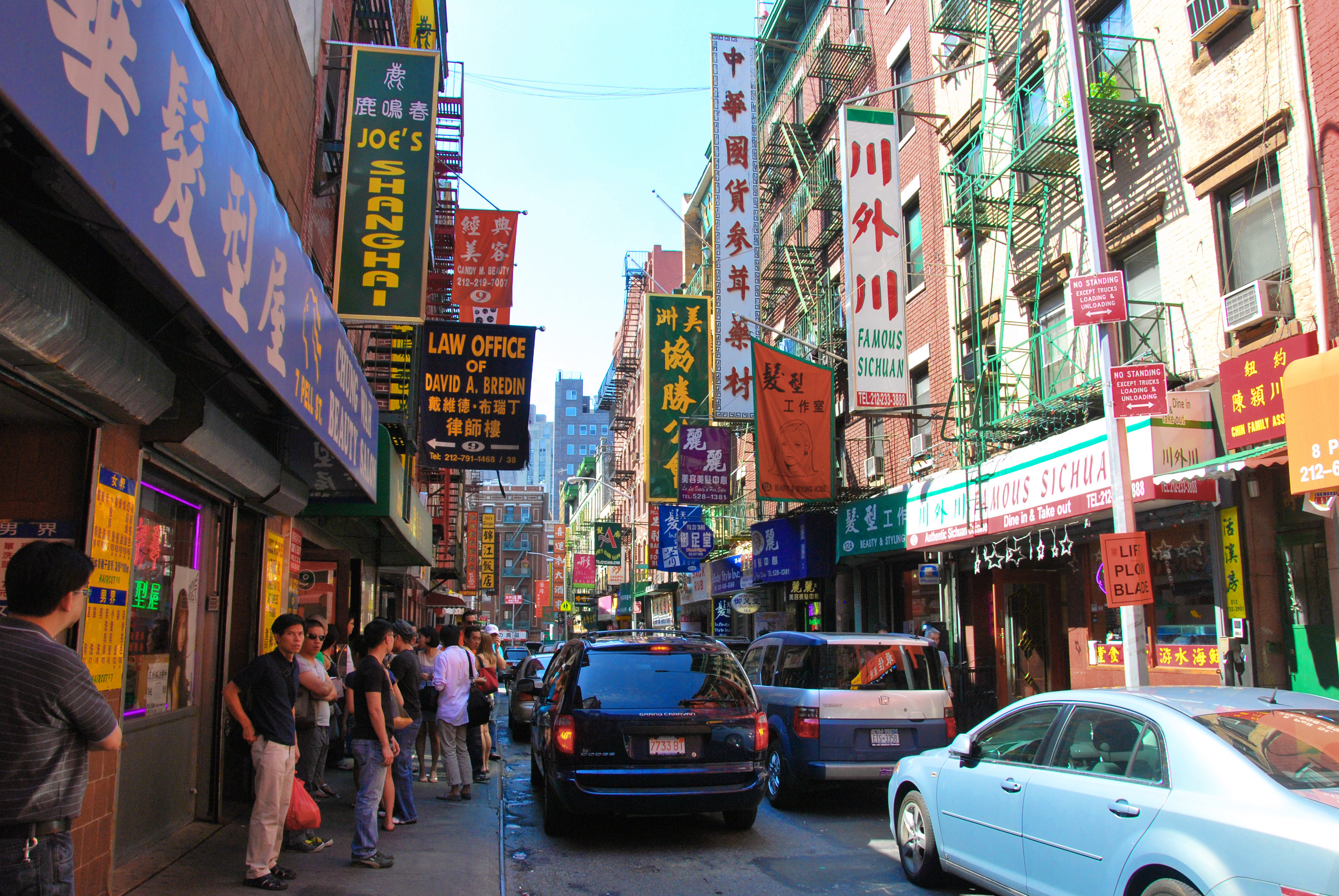
Manhattan Chinatown

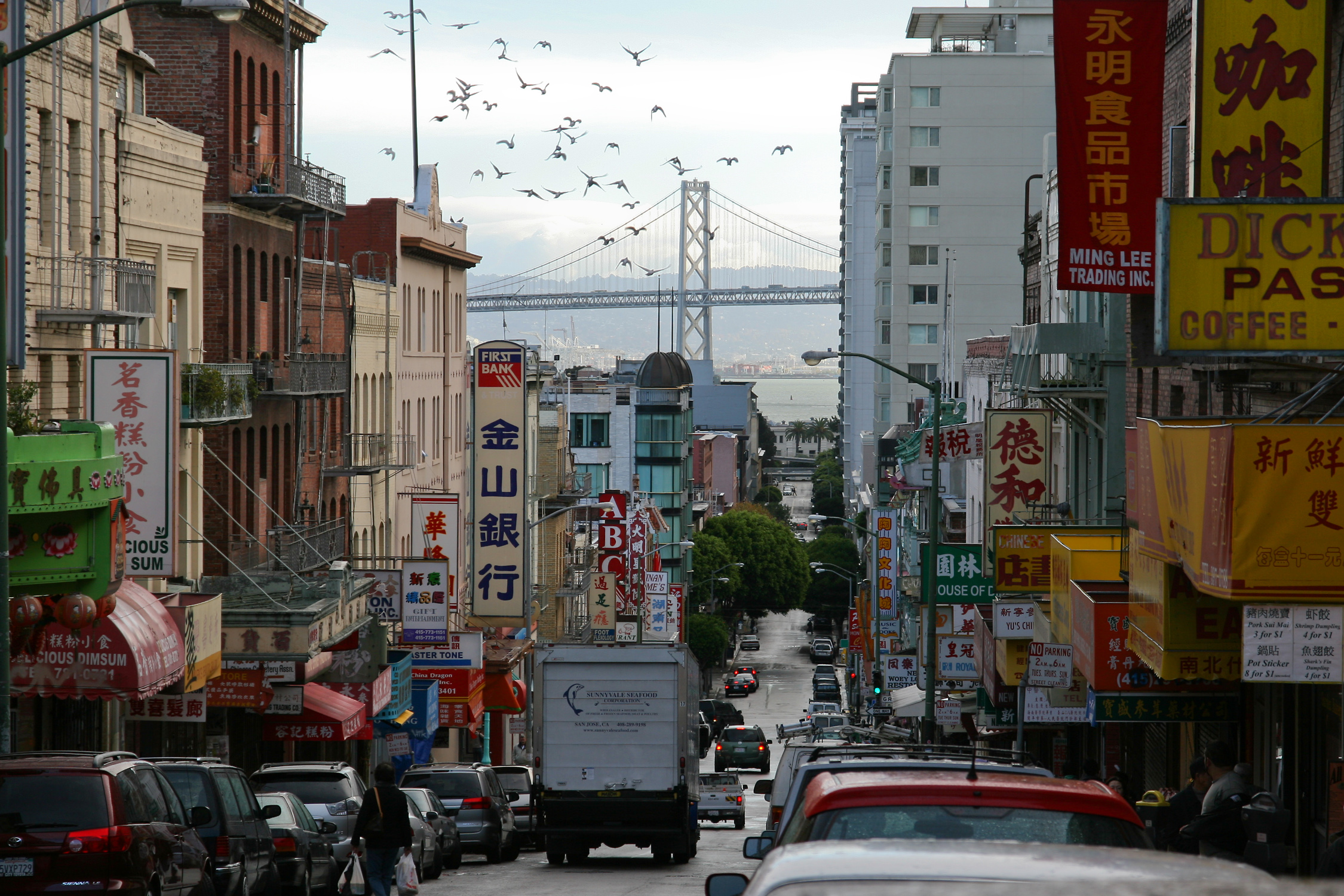
San Francisco's Chinatown

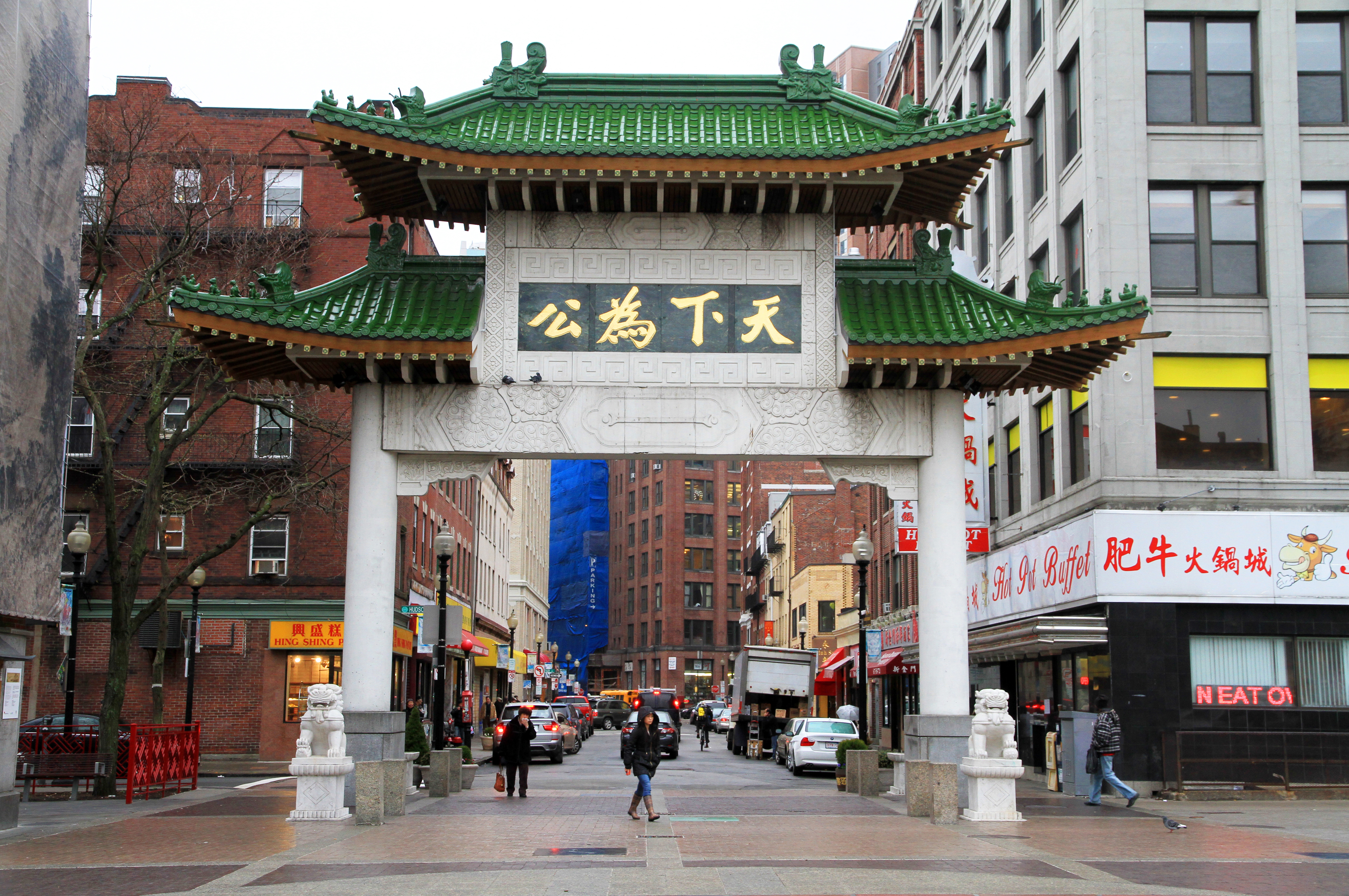
Chinatown, Boston

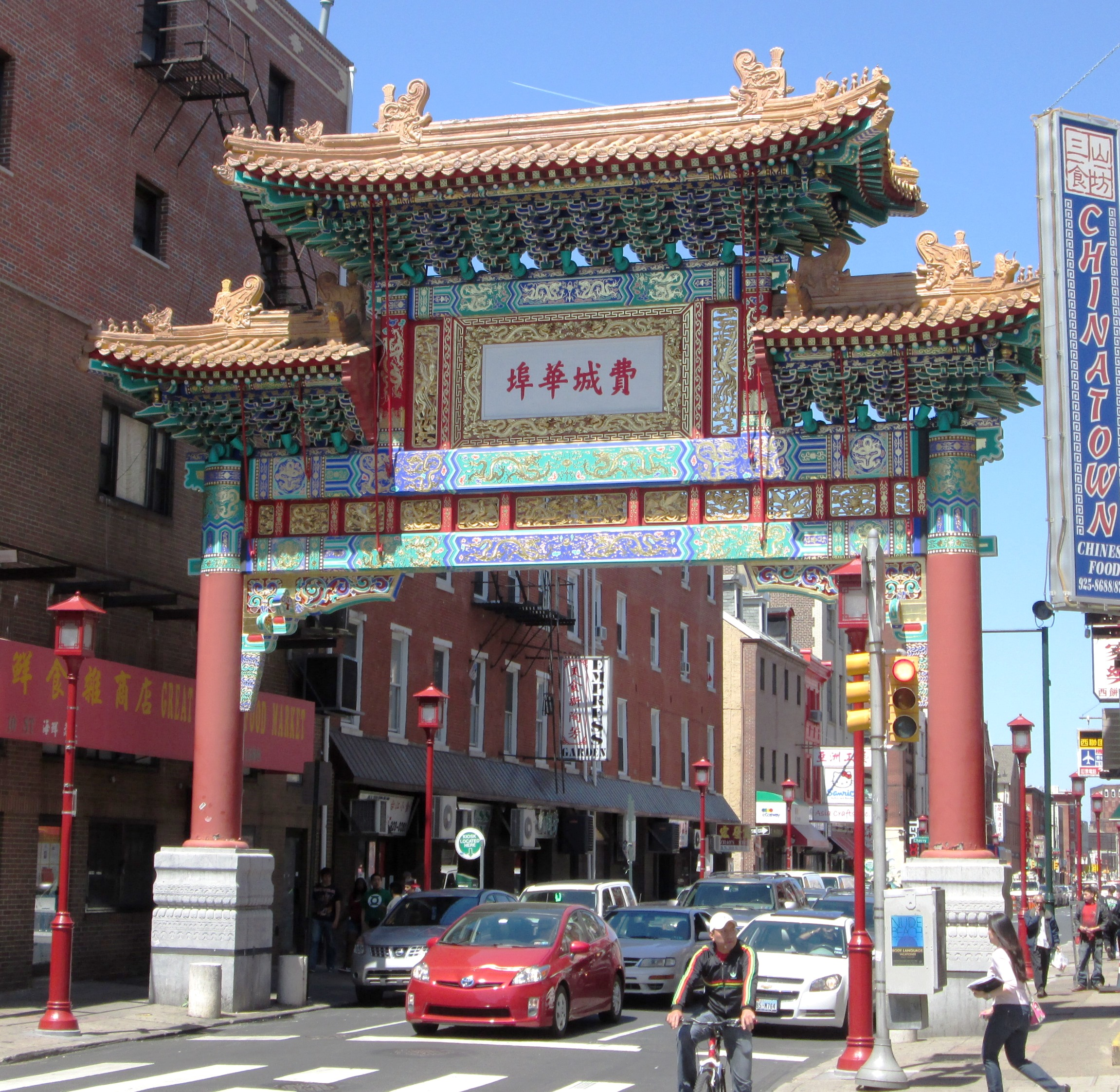
Chinatown, Philadelphia

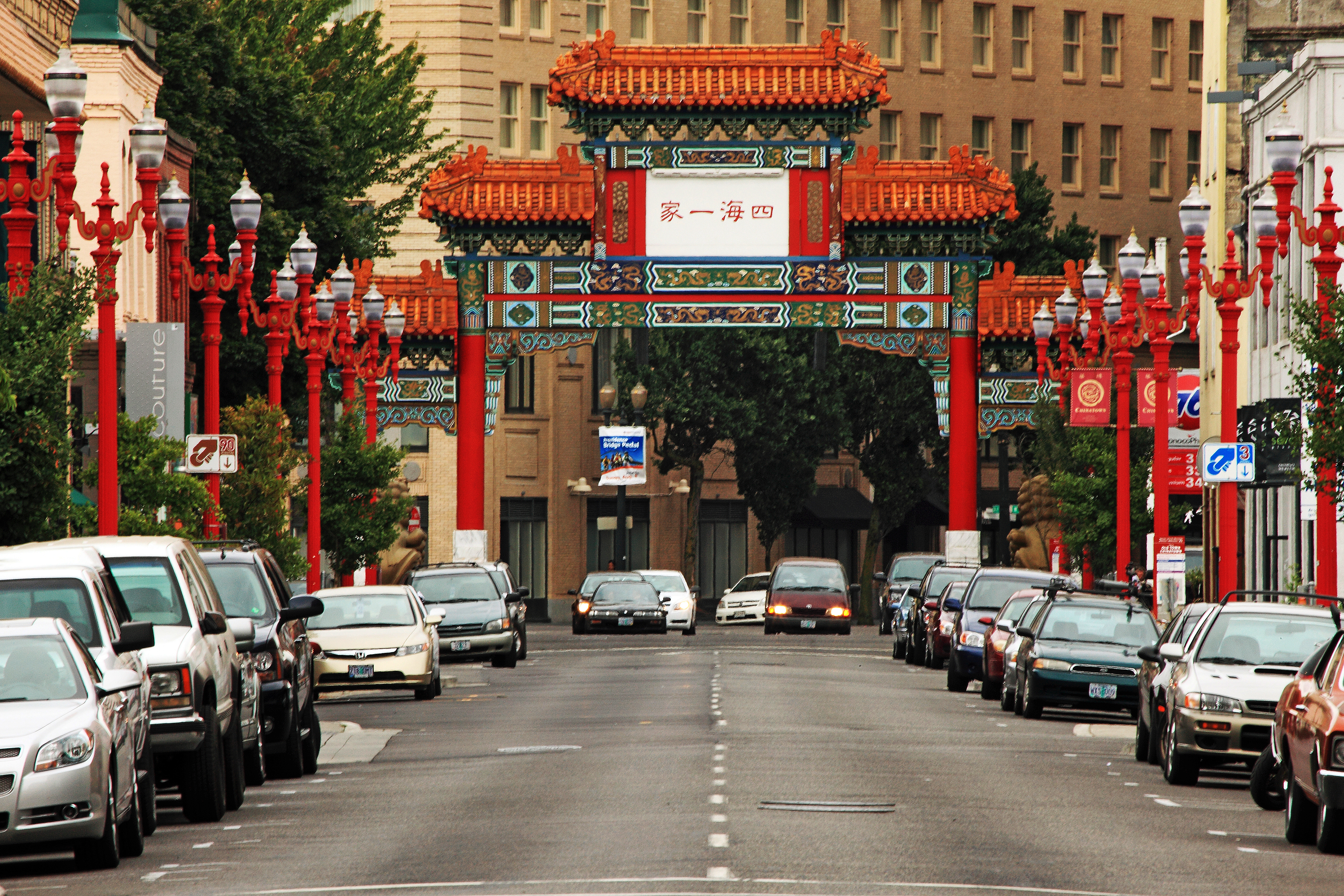
Portland, Oregon's Chinatown

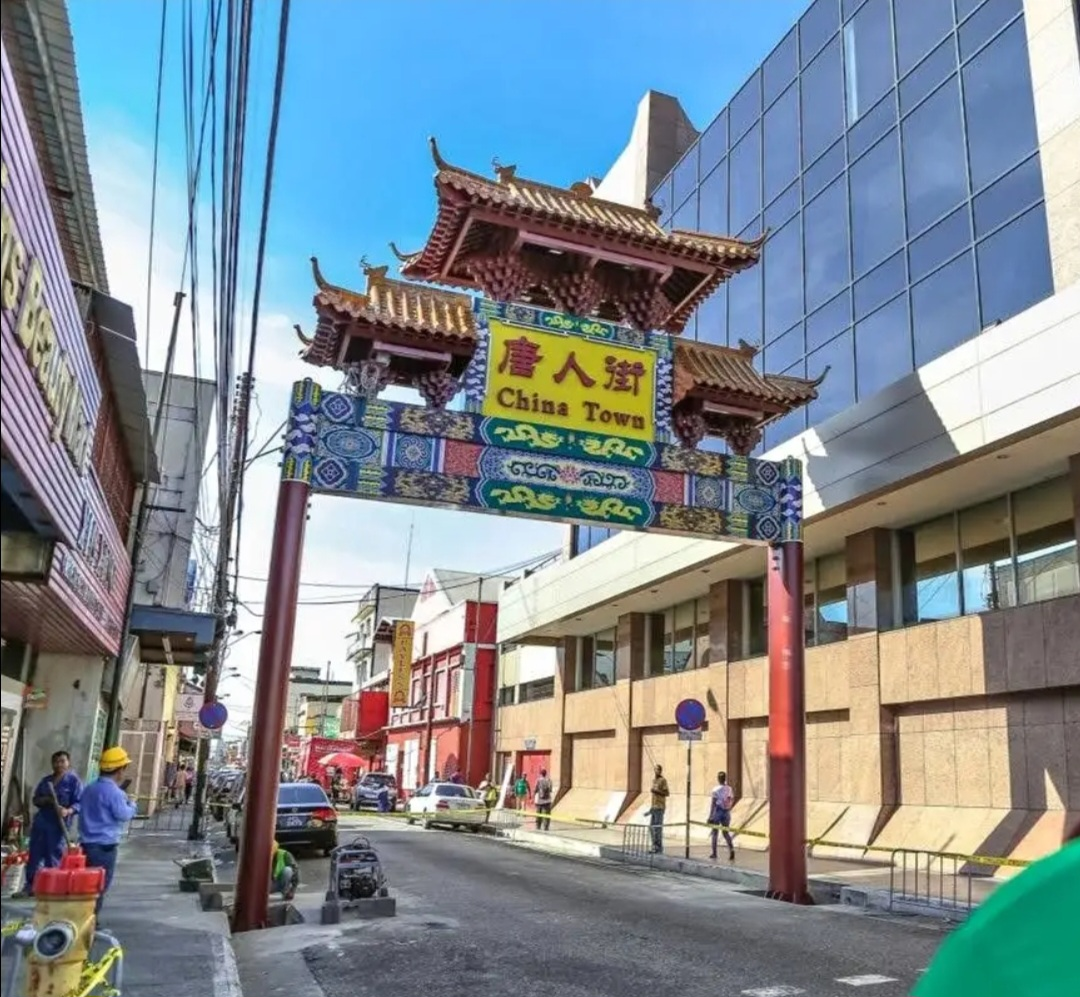
Chinatown, Port of Spain

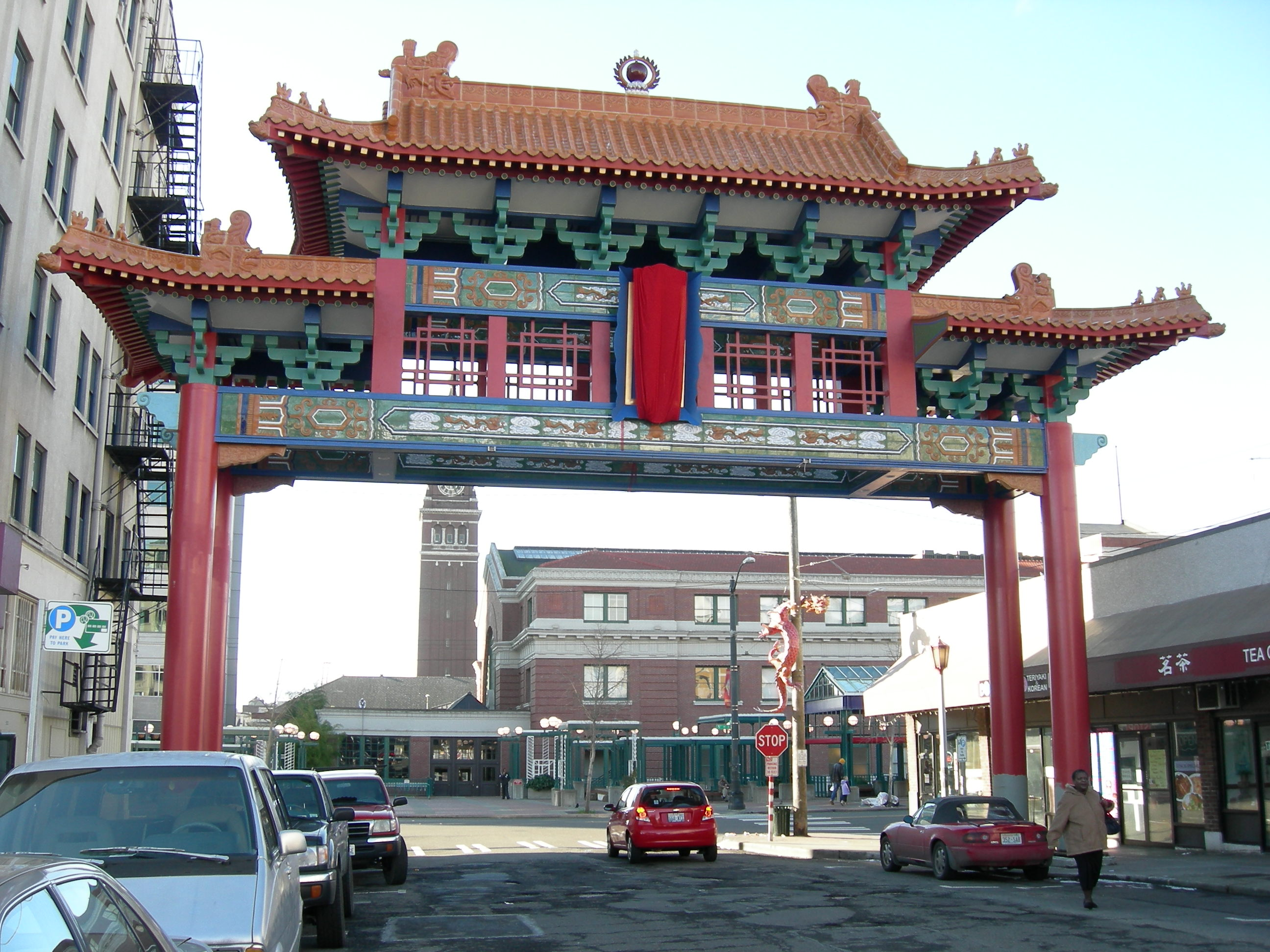
Seattle Chinatown-International District, Seattle

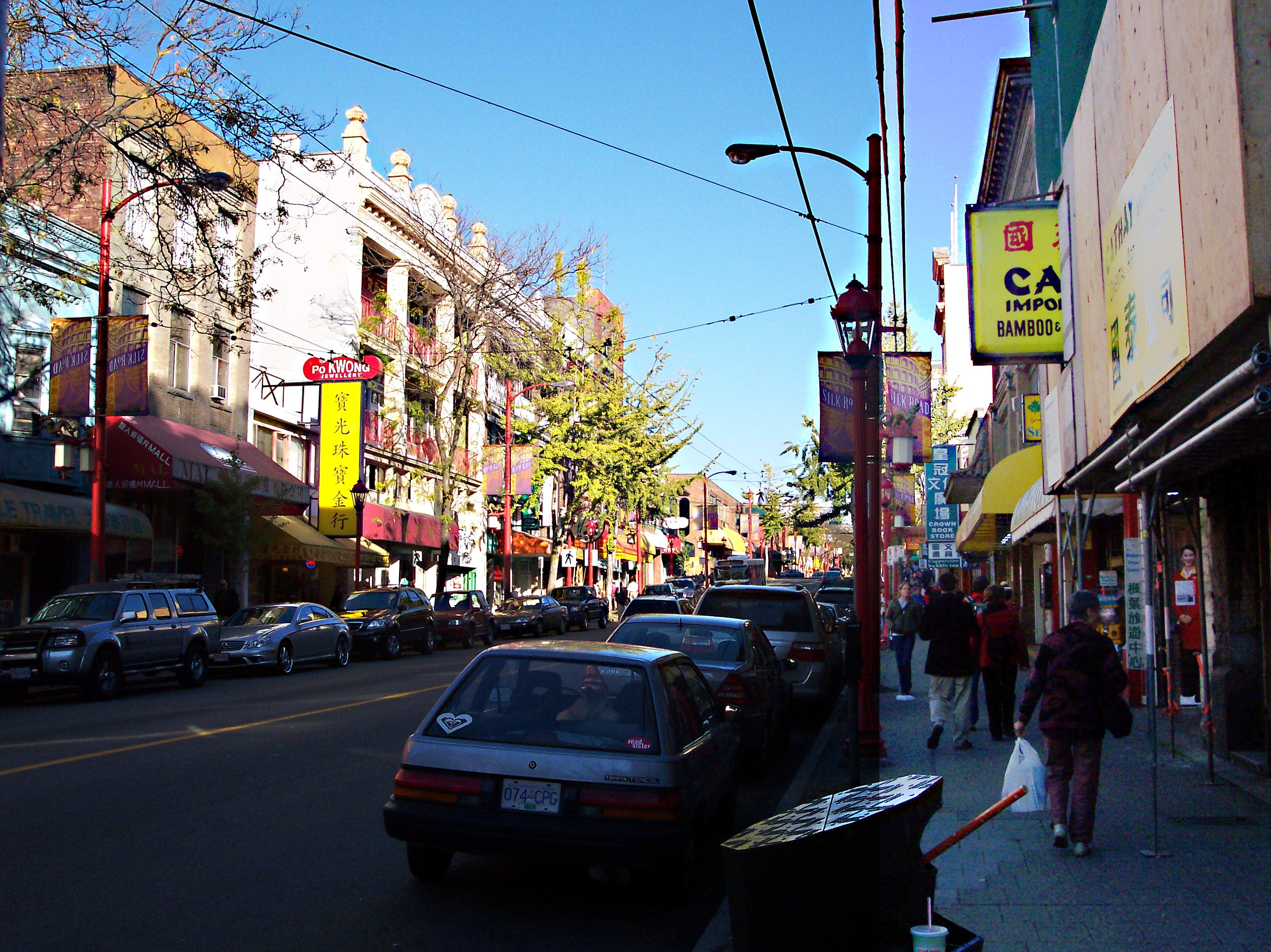
Vancouver Chinatown

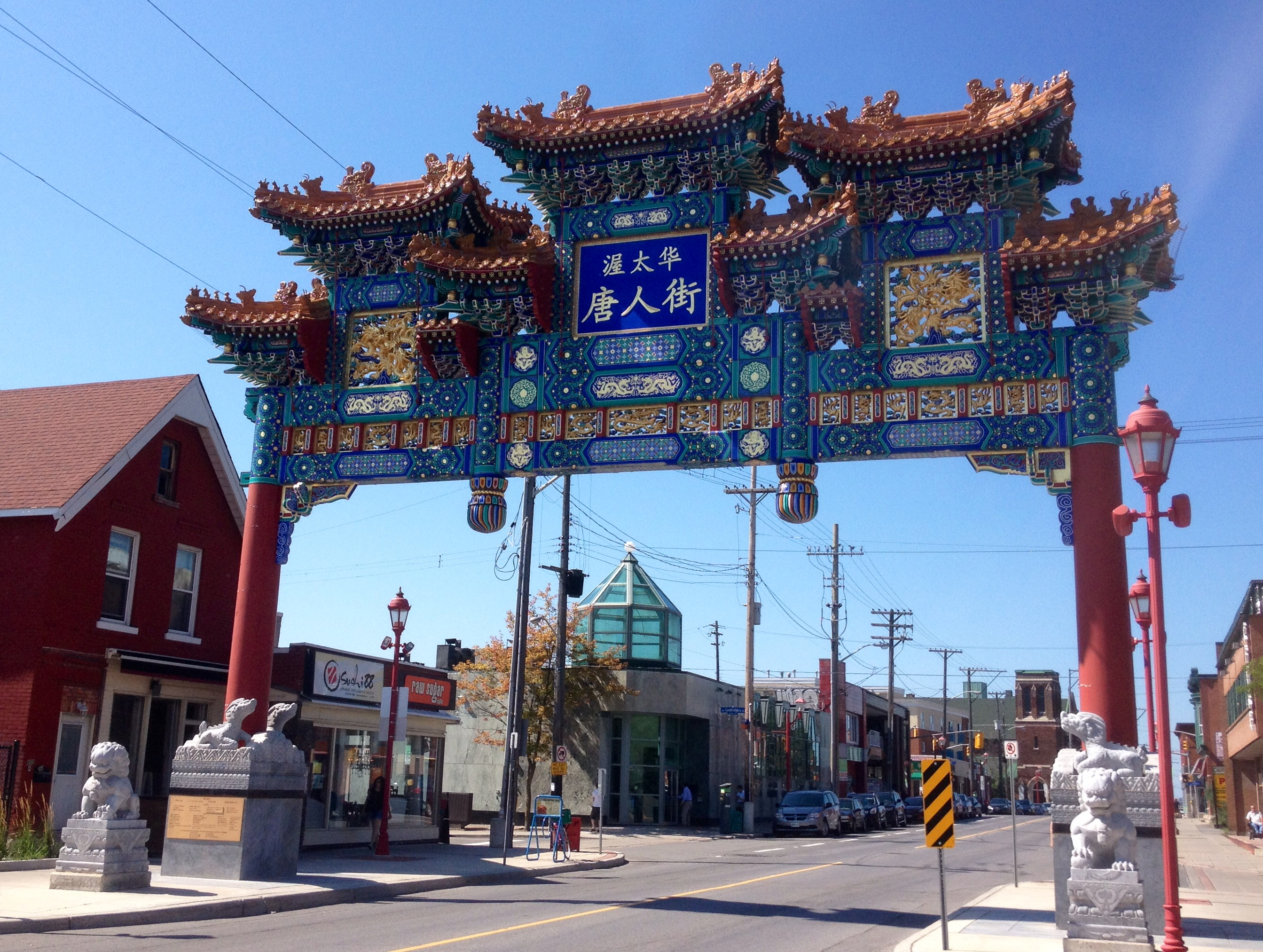
Chinatown in Canada's Capital, Ottawa

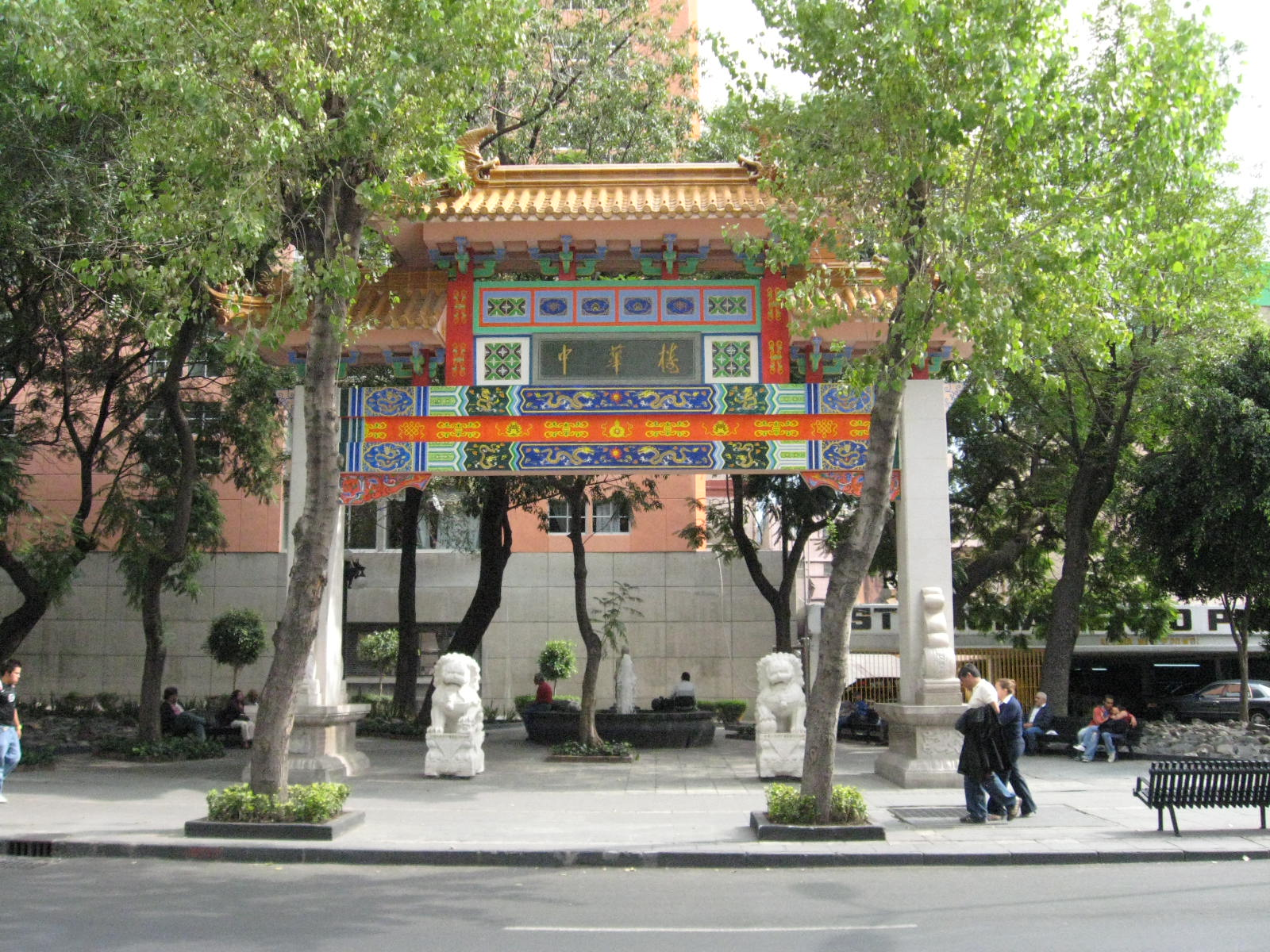
Arch honors Chinese-Mexican community of Mexico City, built in 2008, Articulo 123 Street

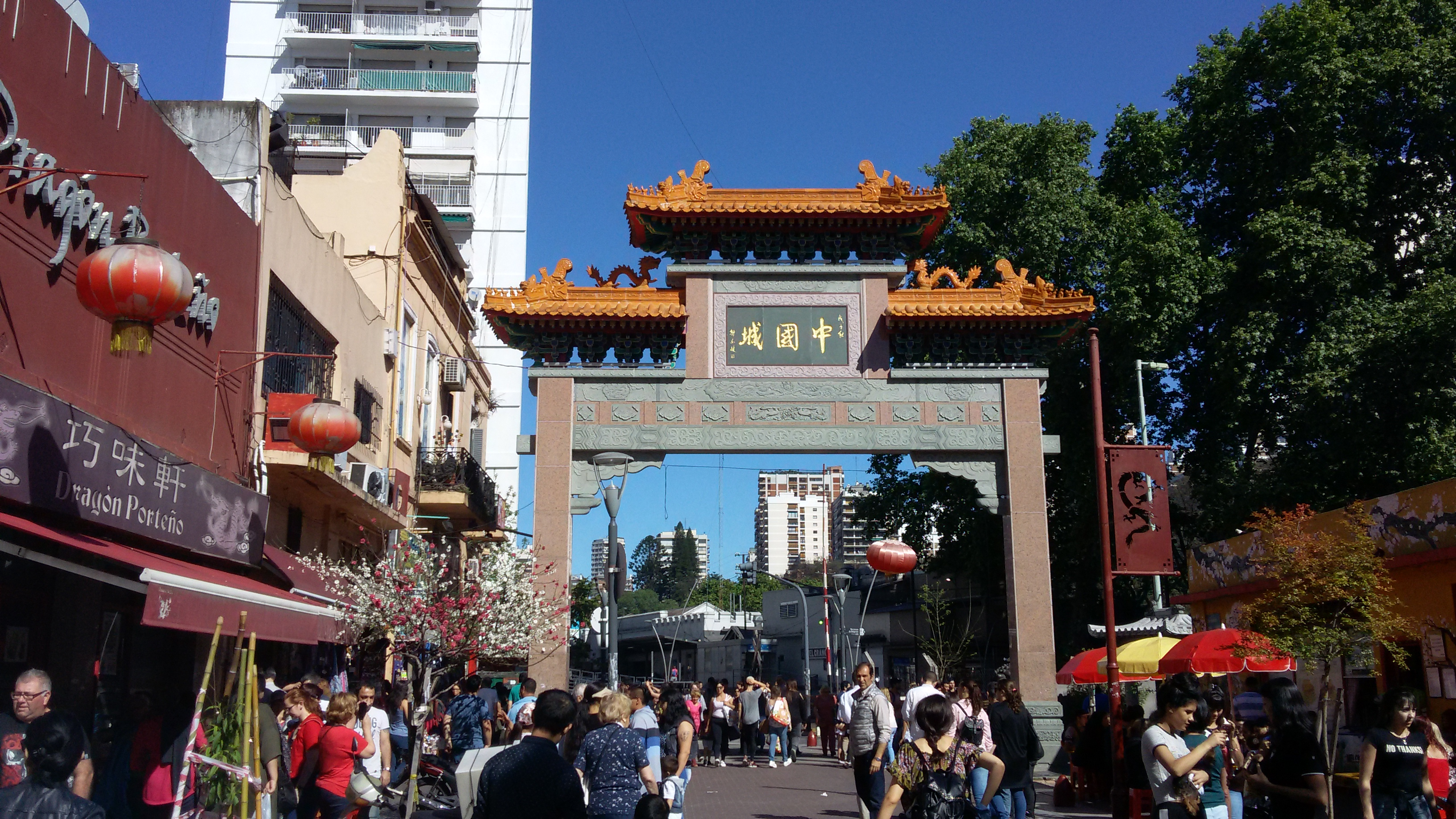
Barrio Chino, Buenos Aires

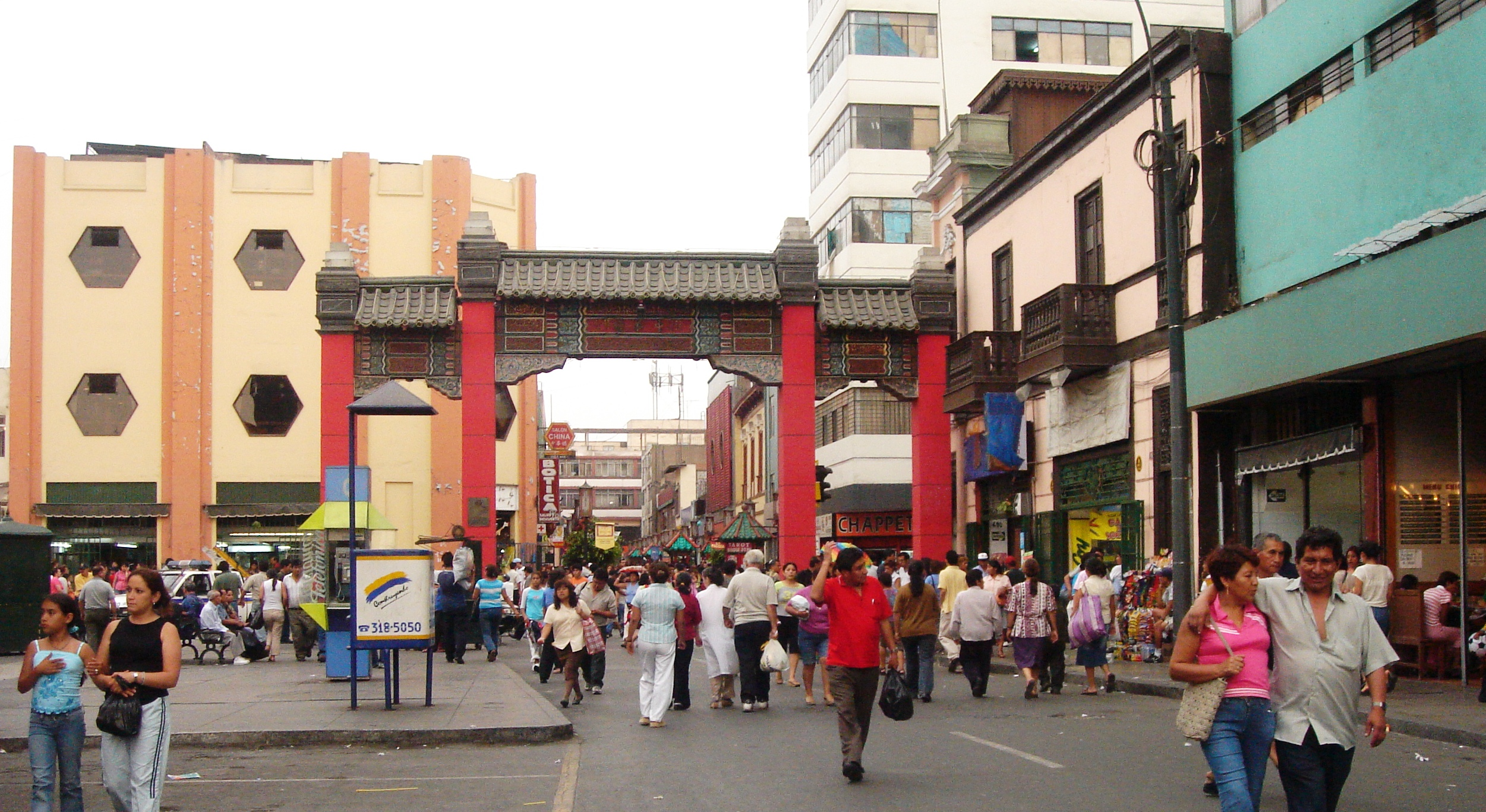
Barrio Chino, Lima

=== Asia ===
Chinatowns in Asia are widespread with a large concentration of overseas Chinese in East Asia and Southeast Asia and ethnic Chinese whose ancestors came from southern China – particularly the provinces of Guangdong, Fujian, and Hainan – and settled in countries such as Brunei, Cambodia, Indonesia, Laos, Malaysia, Myanmar, Singapore, the Philippines, Thailand, and Vietnam centuries ago—starting as early as the Tang dynasty, but mostly notably in the 17th through the 19th centuries (during the reign of the Qing dynasty), and well into the 20th century. Today the Chinese diaspora in Asia is largely concentrated in Southeast Asia however the legacy of the once widespread overseas Chinese communities in Asia is evident in the many Chinatowns that are found across East Asia, South Asia, and Southeast Asia.

Vietnam houses the largest Chinatown by size in Ho Chi Minh City (formerly Saigon).

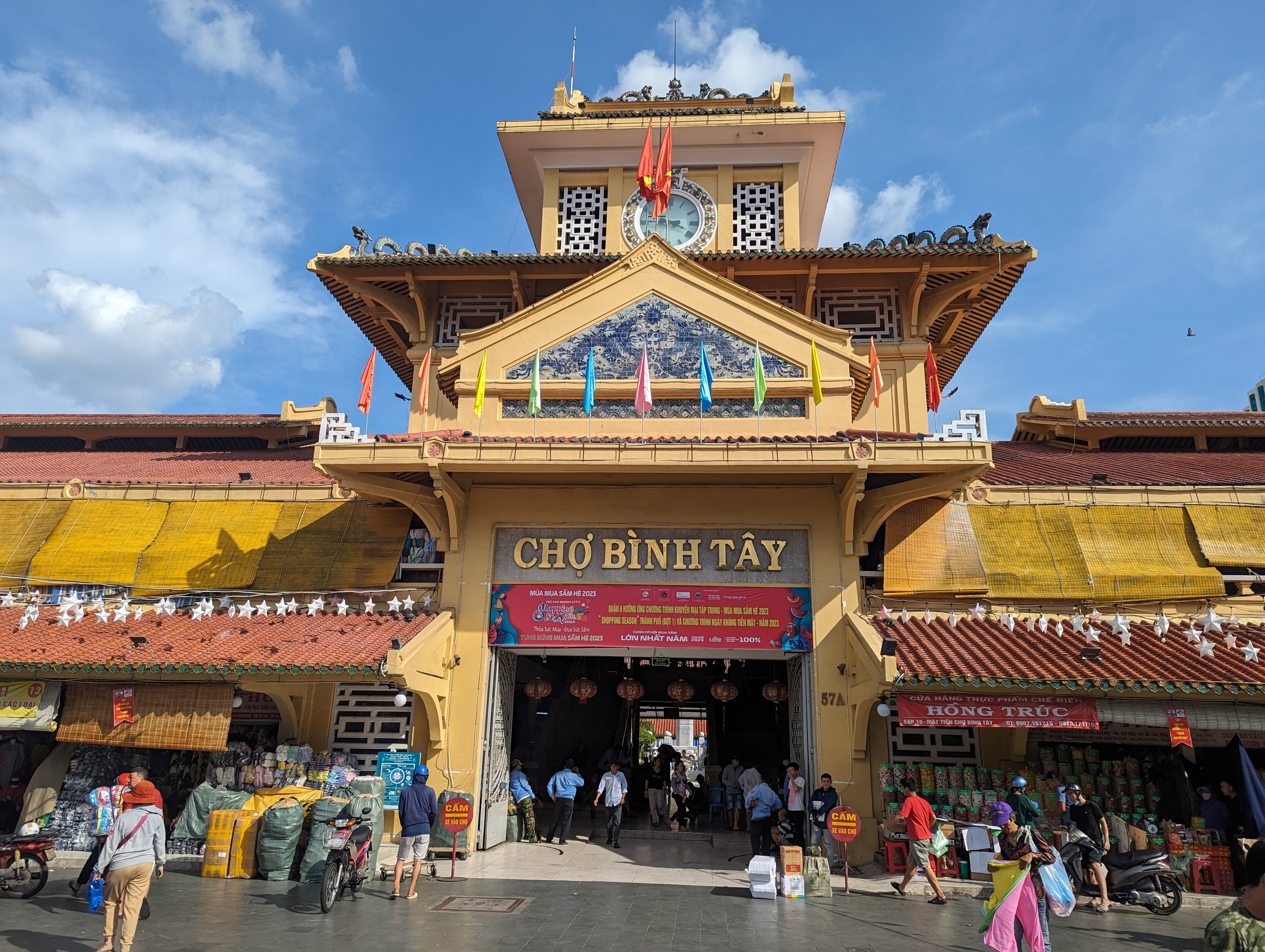
Chợ Lớn, Ho Chi Minh City, Vietnam, the world's largest Chinatown

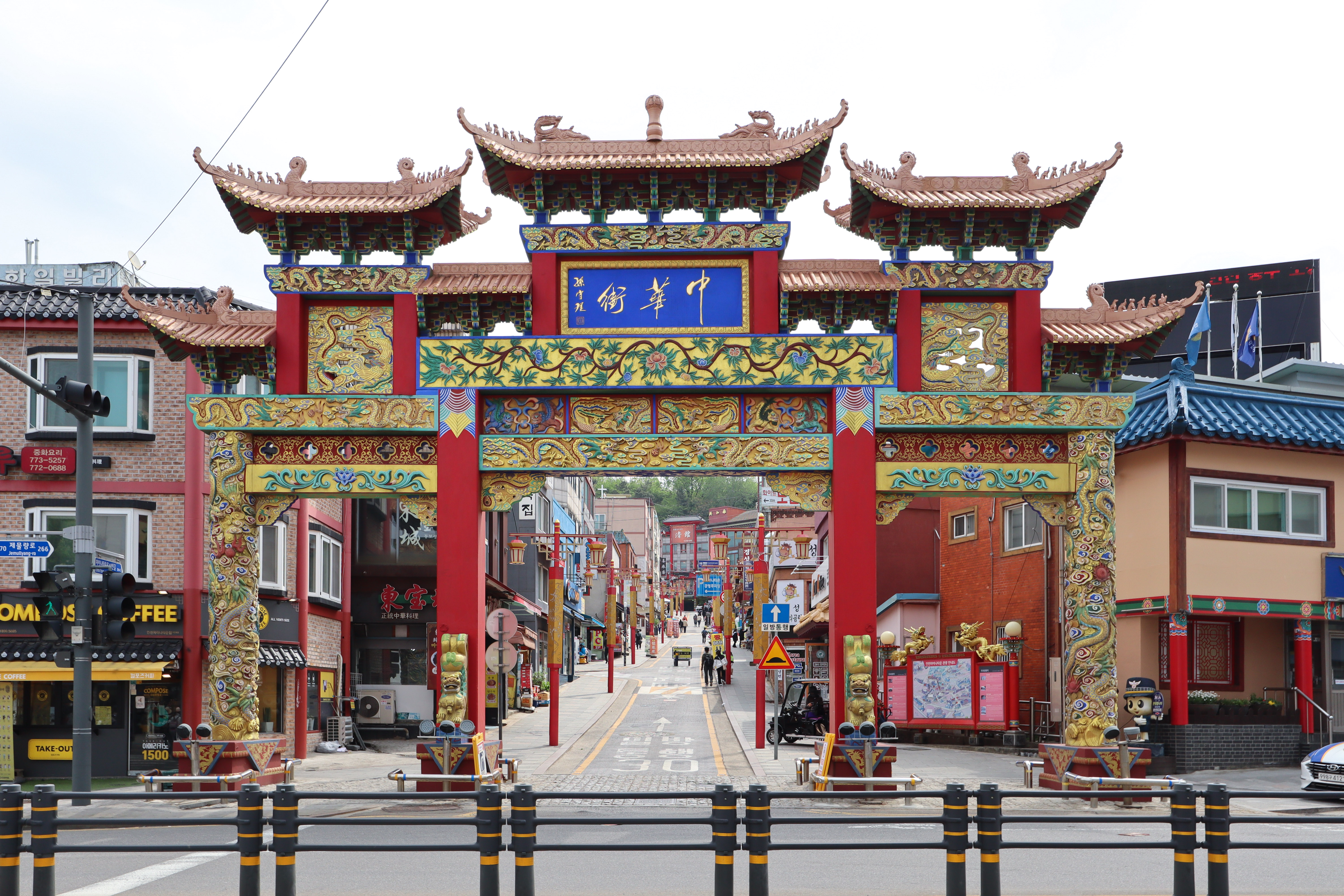
The Gate of the Incheon Chinatown, South Korea. This is the only official Chinatown in the country

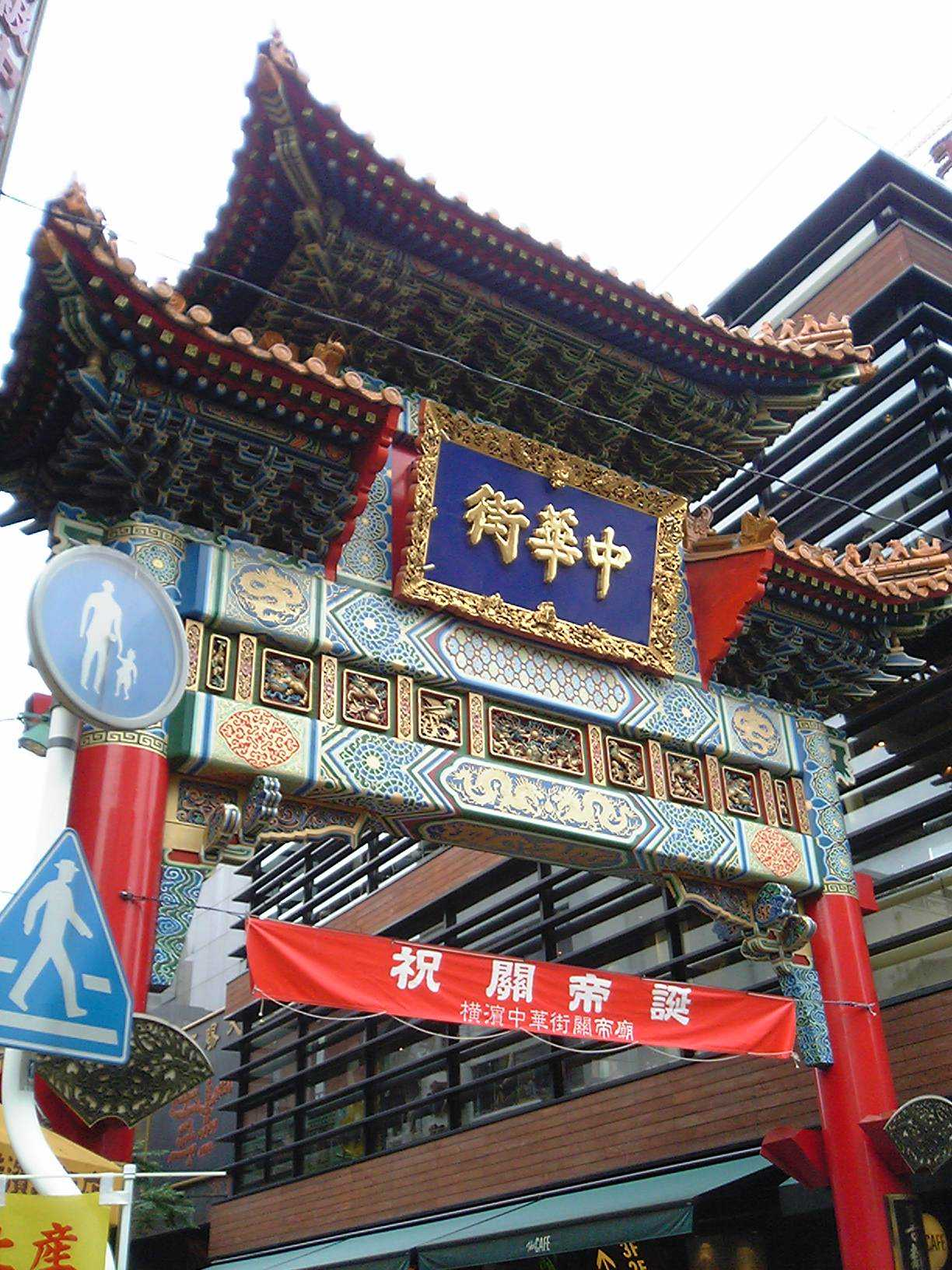
Yokohama Chinatown's Goodwill Gate in Japan

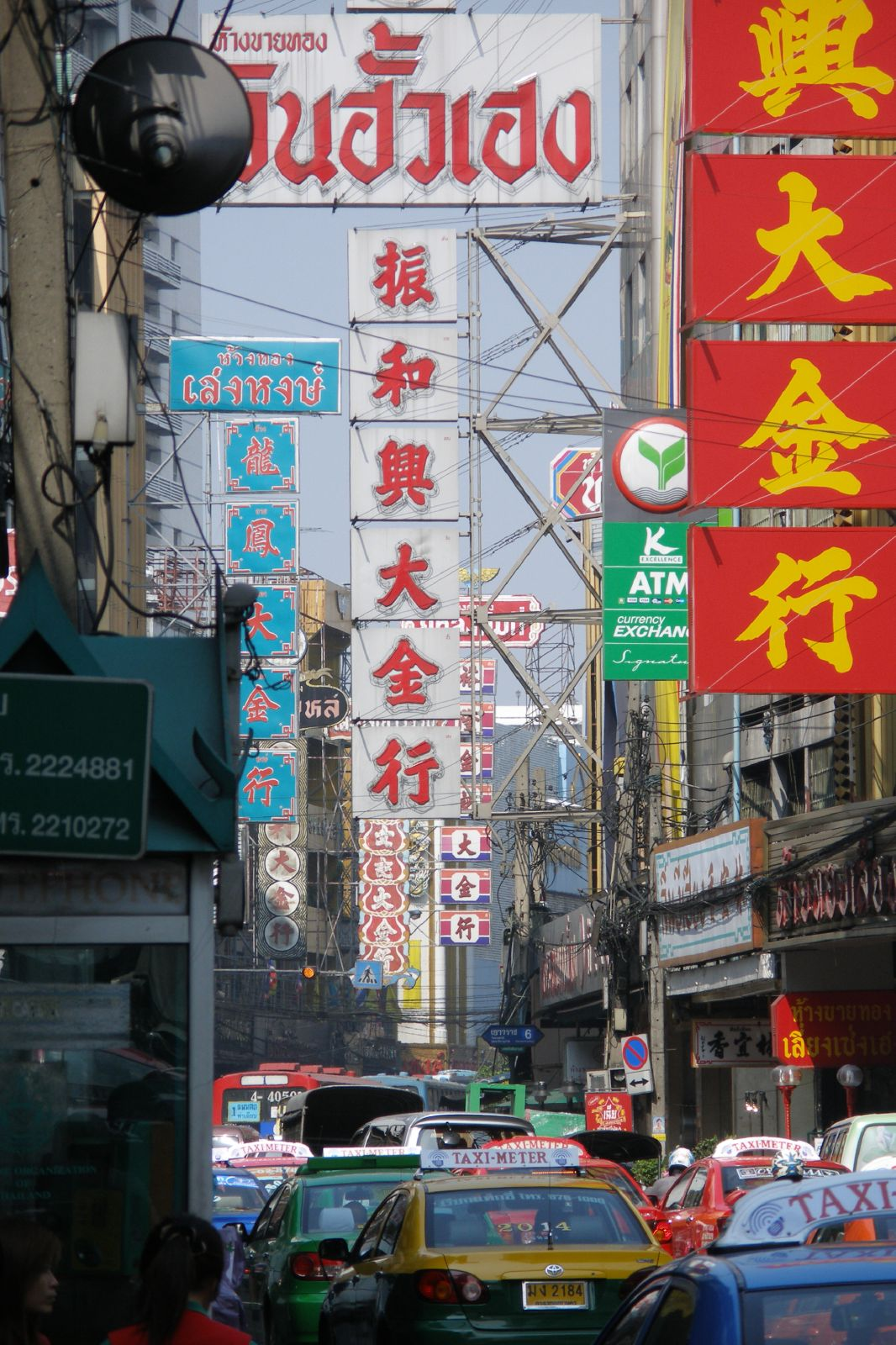
Chinatown in Bangkok, Thailand

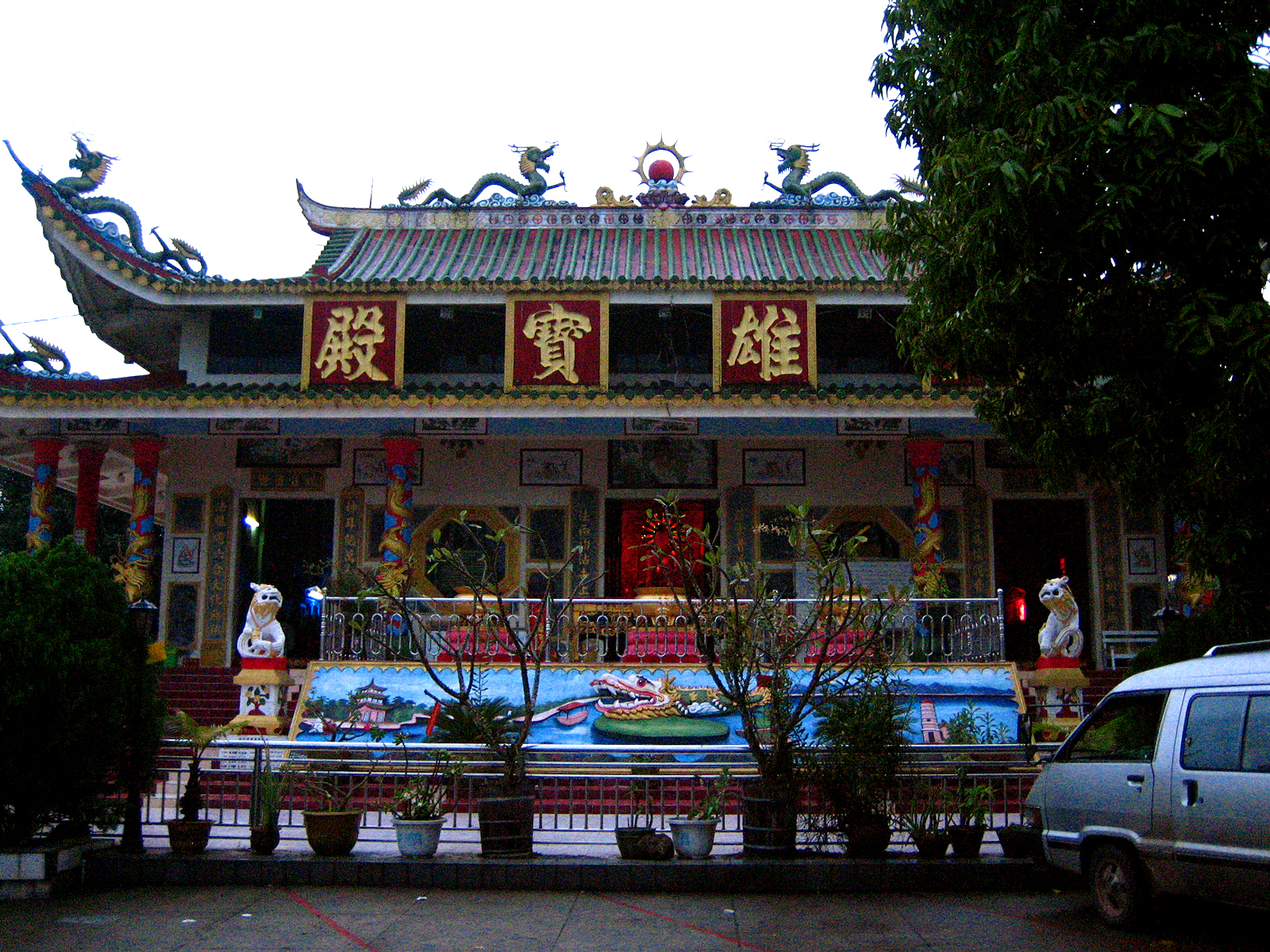
Kan Yin Temple (Kwan Yin Si), a place of worship for Burmese Chinese in Bago, also serves as a Mandarin school.

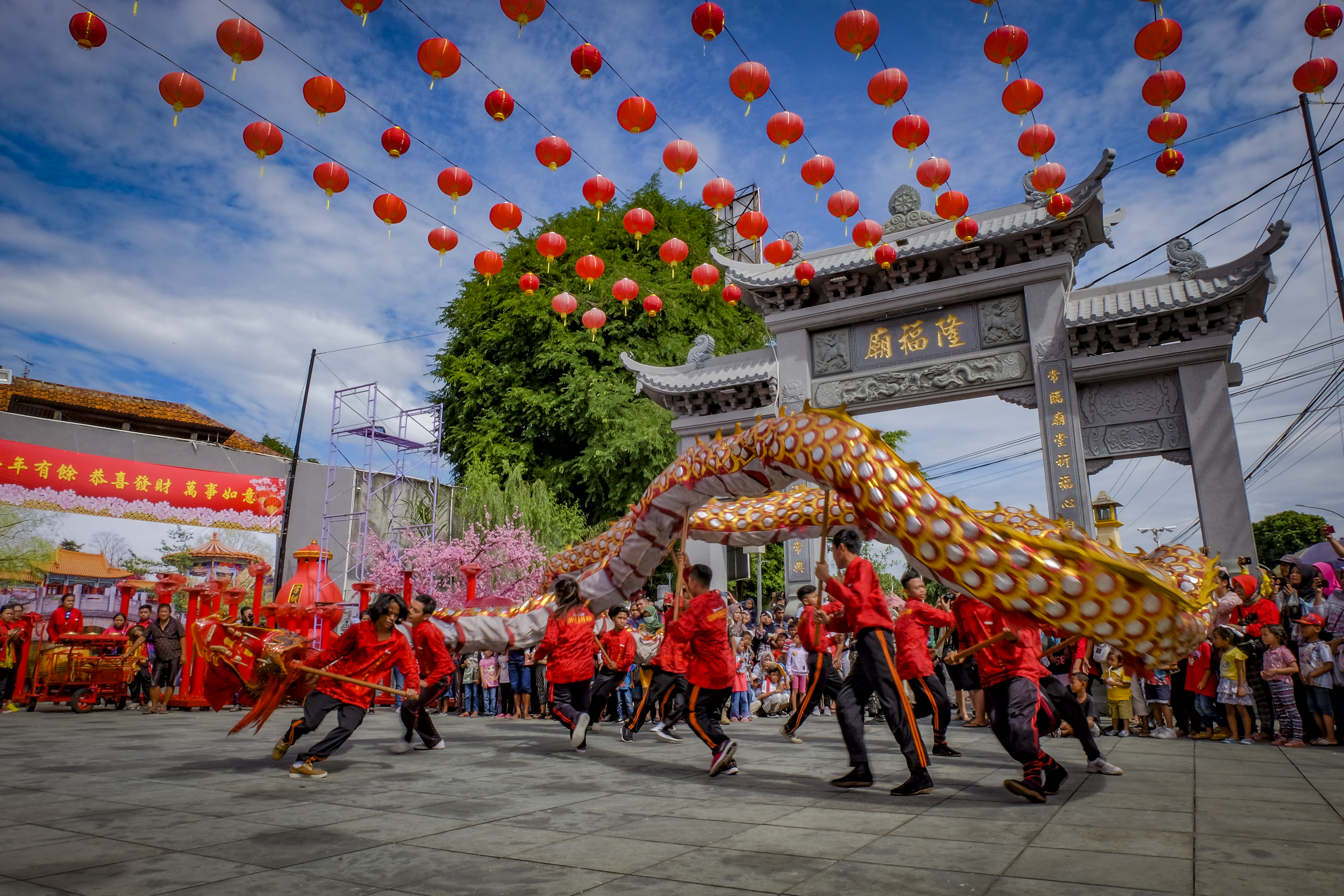
Chinatown gate performing an attraction Dragon dance in Glodok, Jakarta, Indonesia

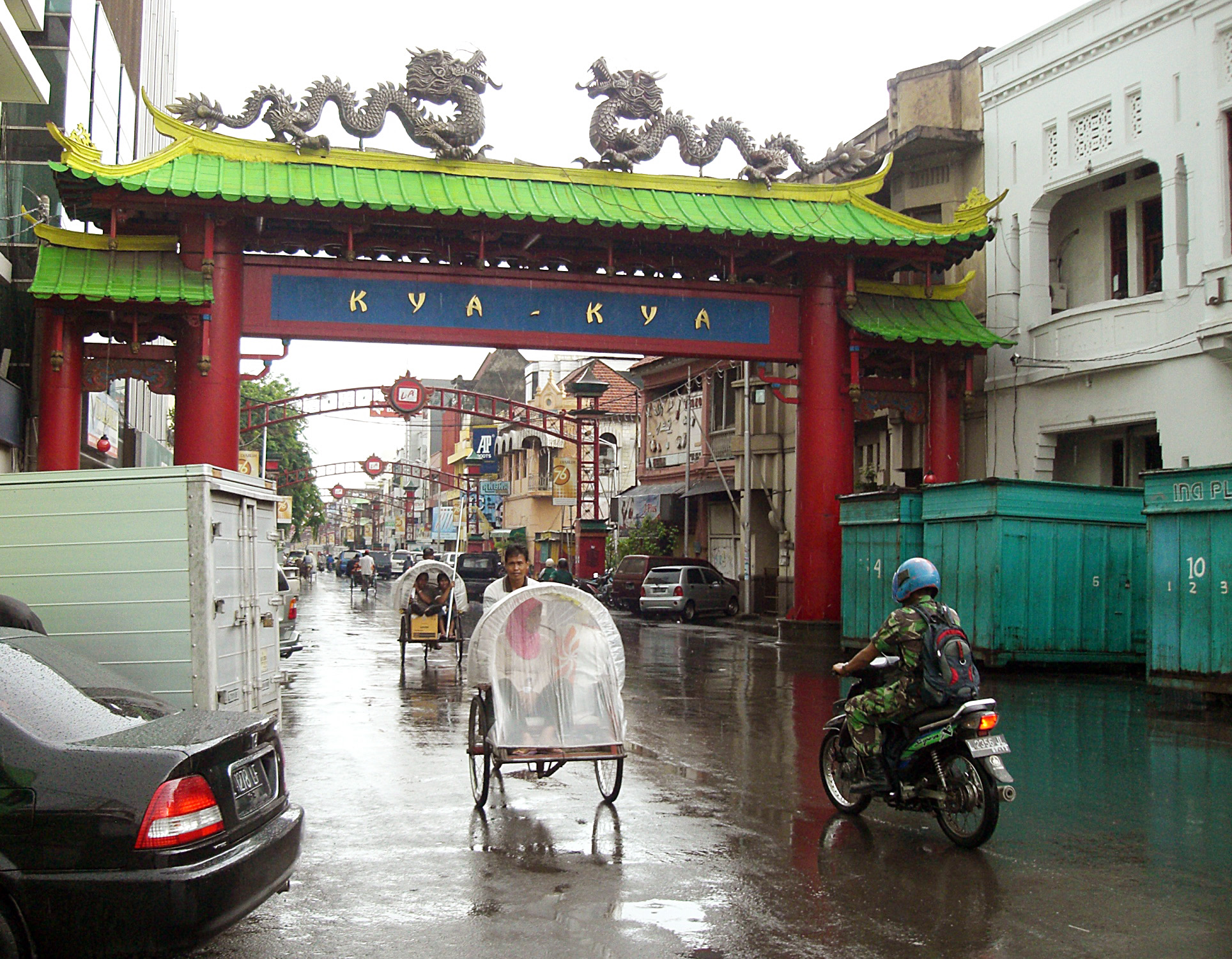
Kya-Kya or Kembang Jepun, Surabaya's Chinatown, one of the oldest Chinatowns in Indonesia

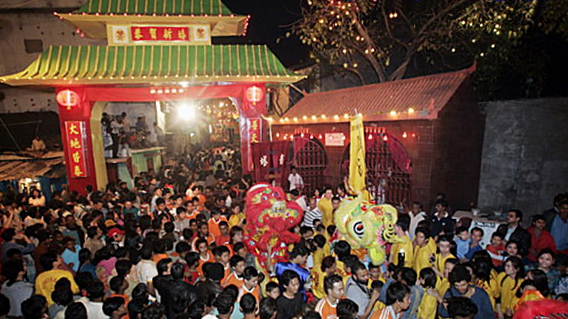
Chinese New Year celebrated in Chinatown, Kolkata, India

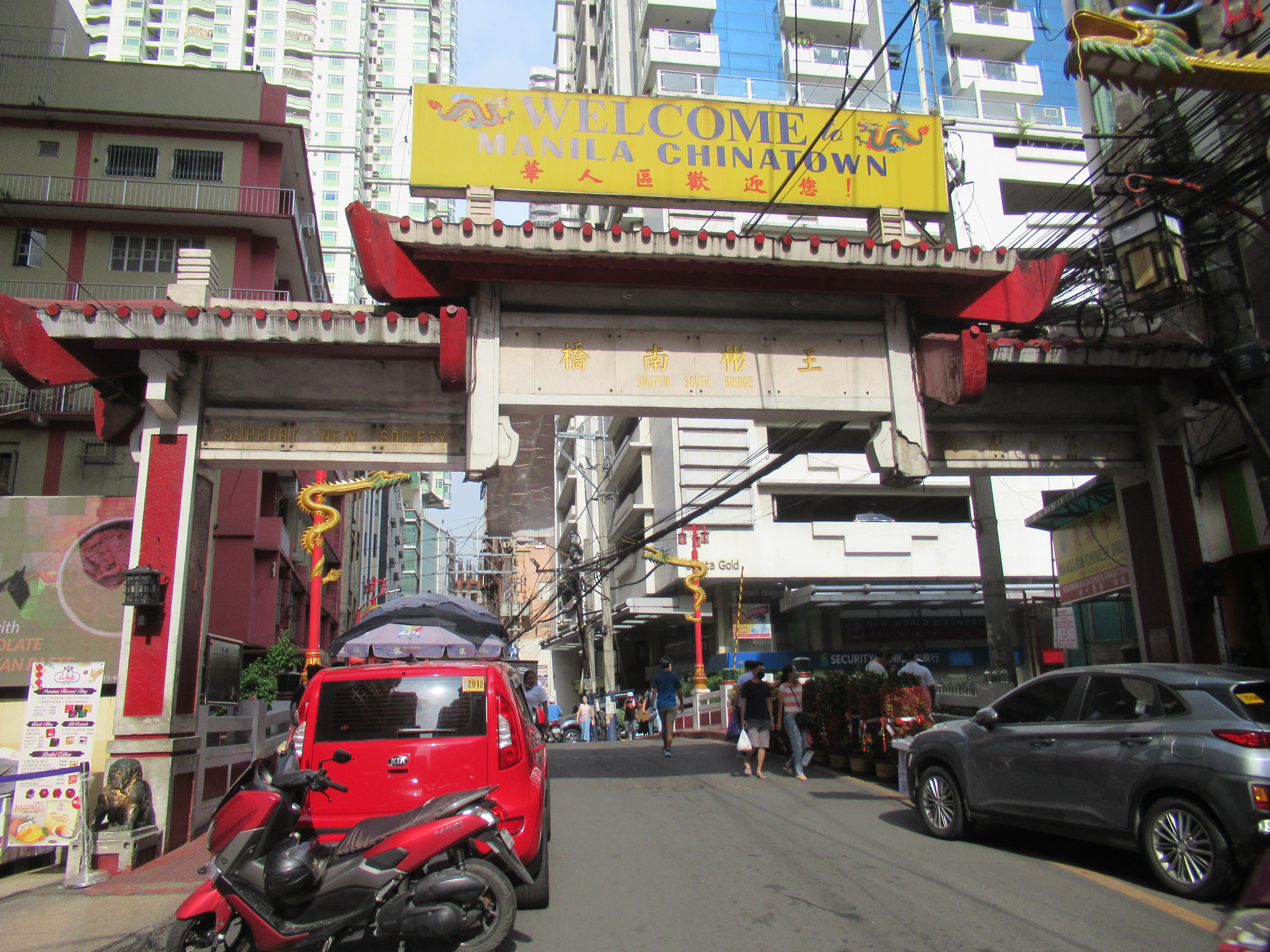
Binondo Chinatown in Manila

=== Australia and Oceania ===
The Chinatown of Melbourne lies within the Melbourne central business district and centers on the eastern end of Little Bourke Street. It extends between the corners of Swanston and Exhibition Streets. Melbourne's Chinatown originated during the Victorian gold rush in 1851, and is notable as the oldest Chinatown in Australia. It has also been claimed to be the longest continuously running Chinese community outside of Asia, but only because the 1906 San Francisco earthquake all but destroyed the Chinatown in San Francisco in California.

Sydney's main Chinatown centers on Sussex Street in the Sydney downtown. It stretches from Central Station in the east to Darling Harbour in the west, and is Australia's largest Chinatown.

The Chinatown of Adelaide was originally built in the 1960s and was renovated in the 1980s. It is located near Adelaide Central Market and the Adelaide Central bus station.

Chinatown Gold Coast is a precinct in the Central Business District of Southport, Queensland, that runs through Davenport Street and Young Street. The precinct extends between Nerang Street in the north and Garden Street/Scarborough Street east-west. Redevelopment of the precinct was established in 2013 and completed in 2015 in time for Chinese New Year celebrations.

There are additional Chinatowns in Brisbane, Perth, and Broome in Australia.

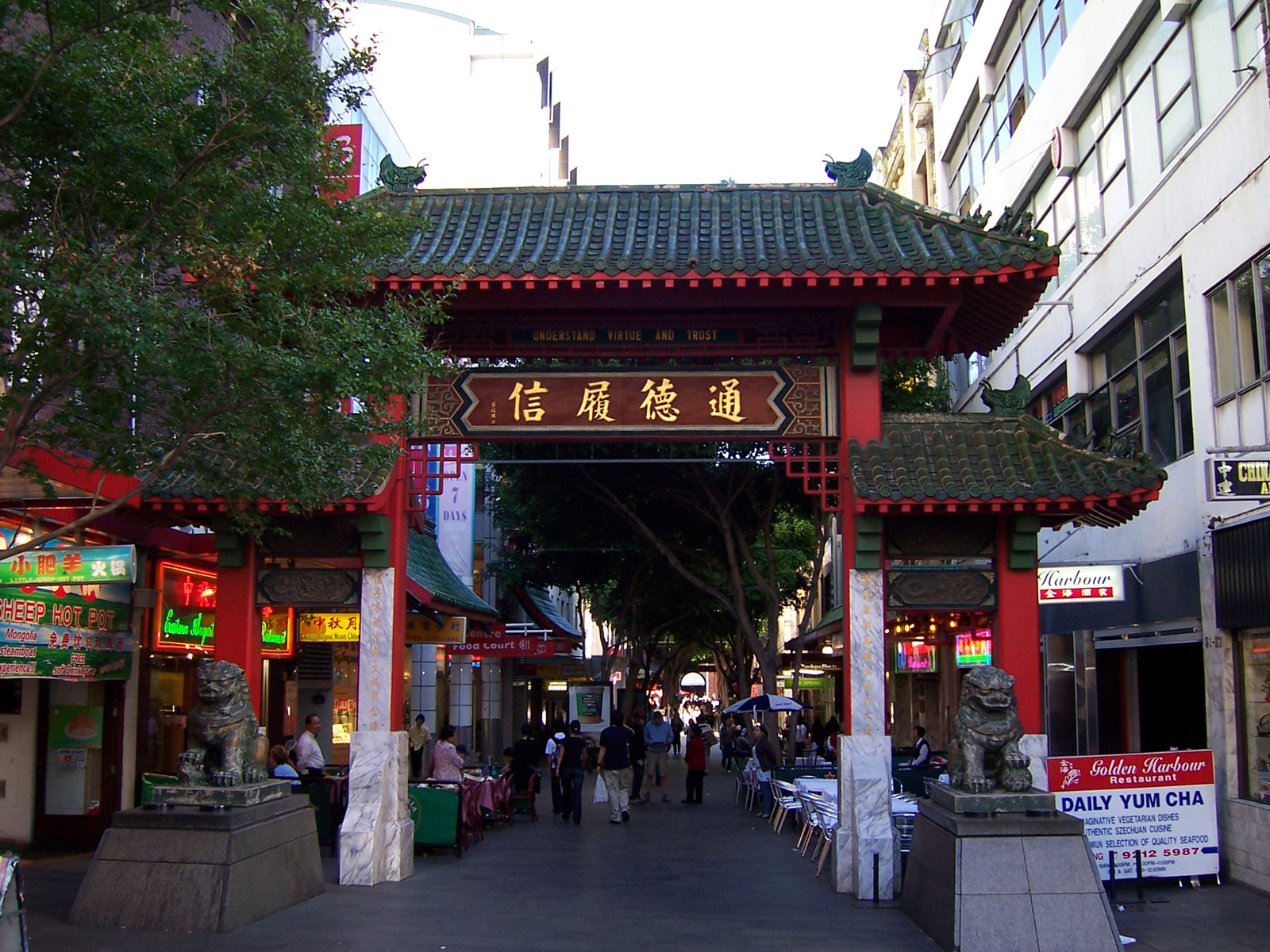
Paifang at Sydney Chinatown

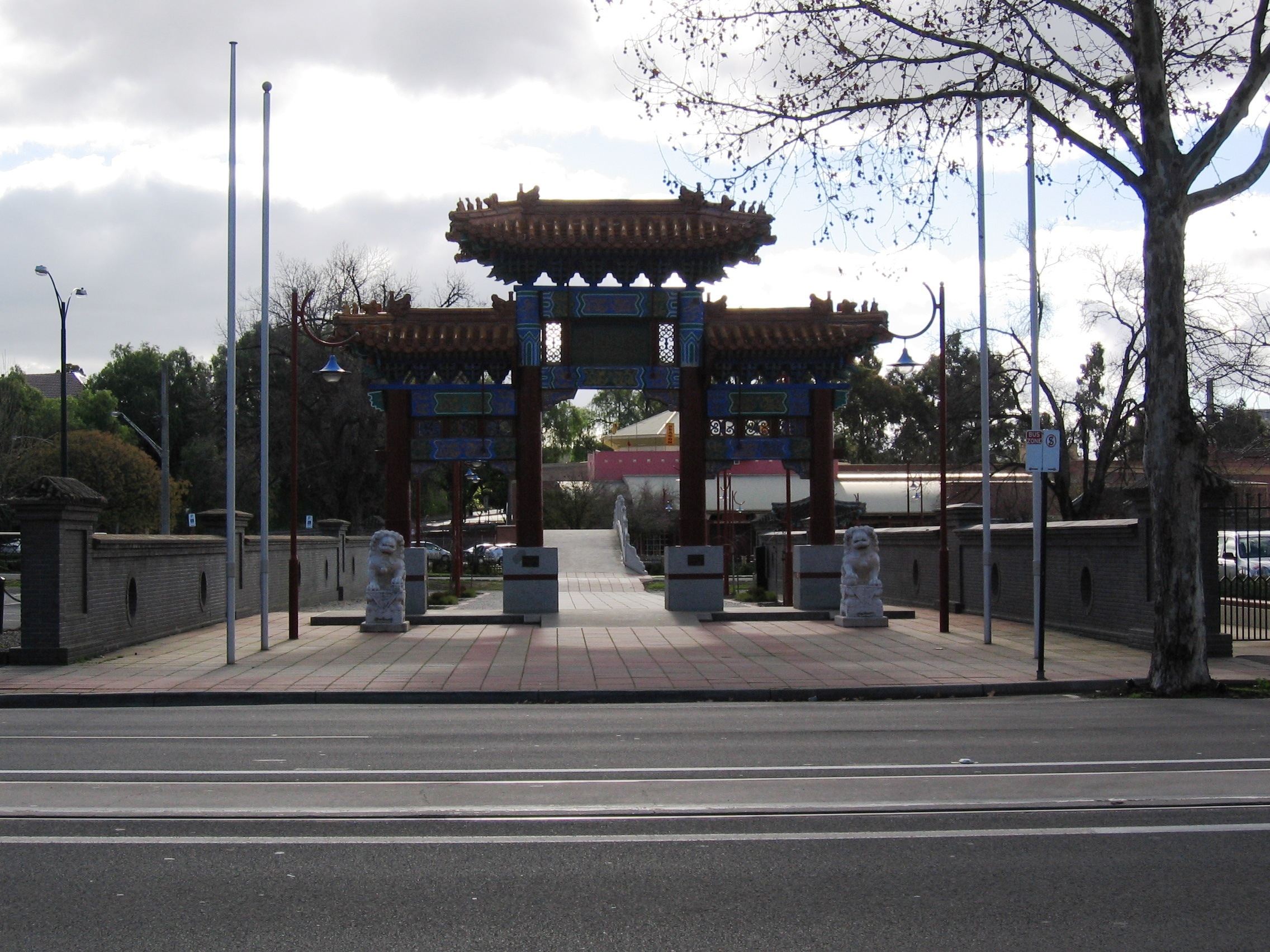
Paifang at Bendigo Chinese Precinct

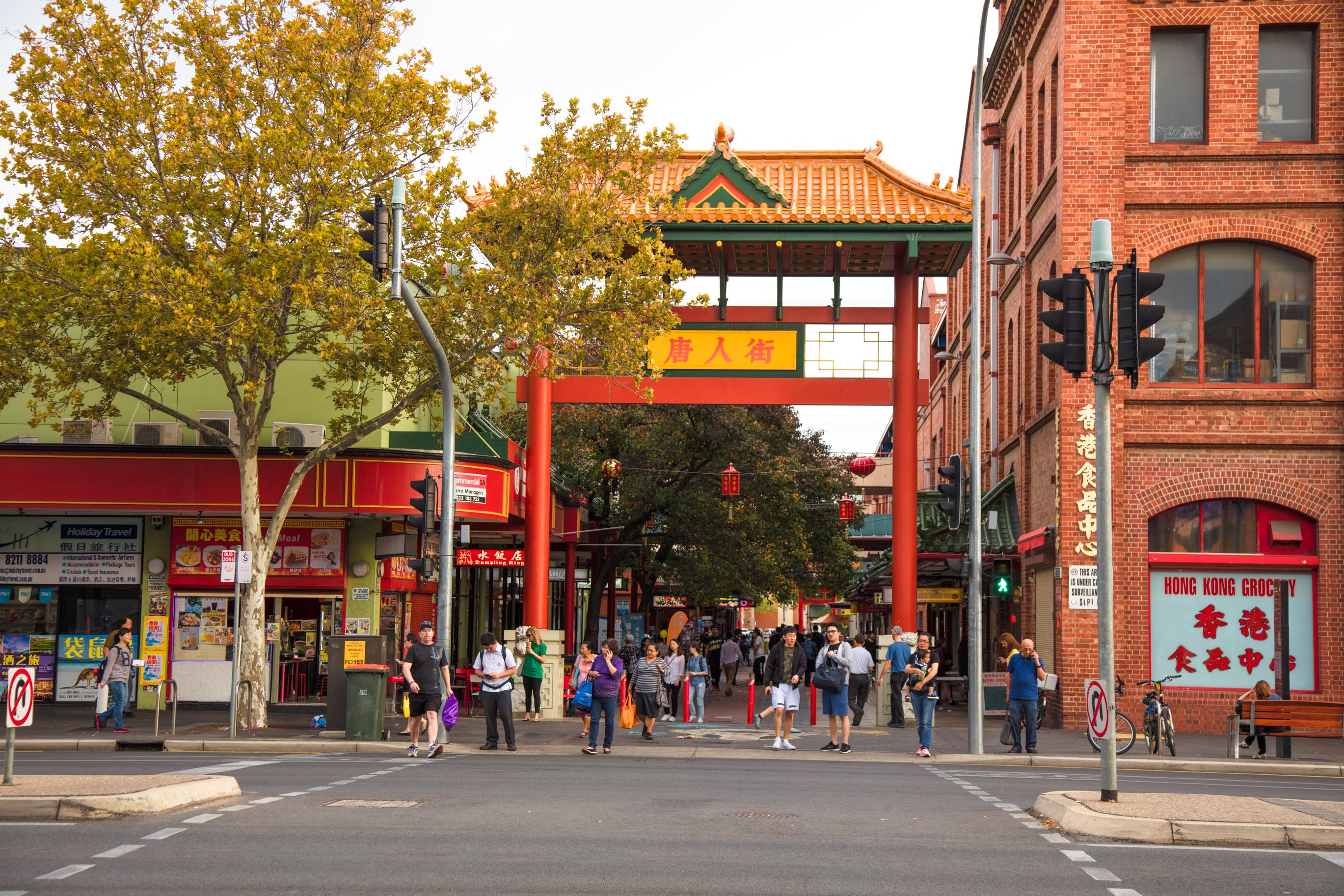
Adelaide Chinatown

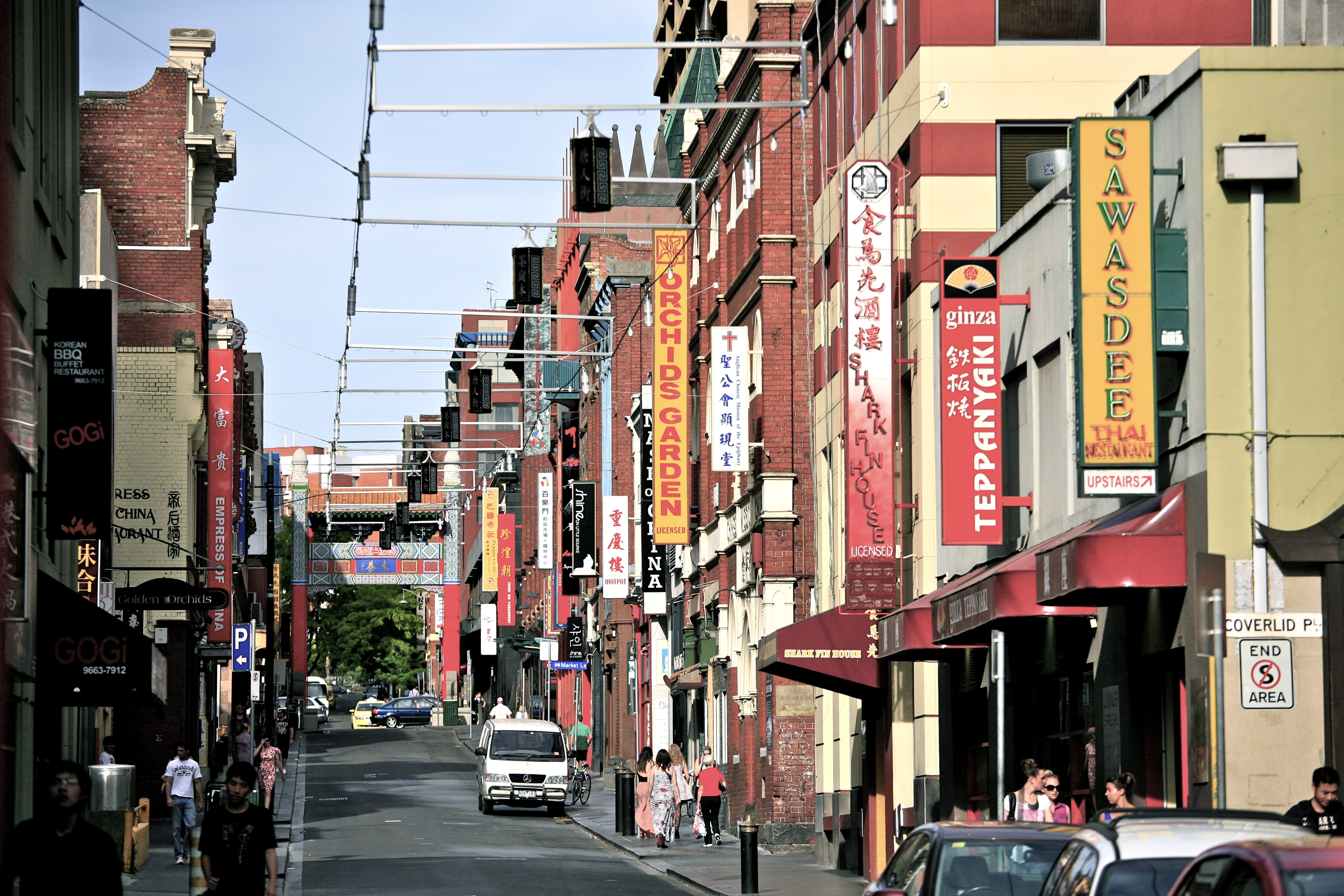
Melbourne Chinatown

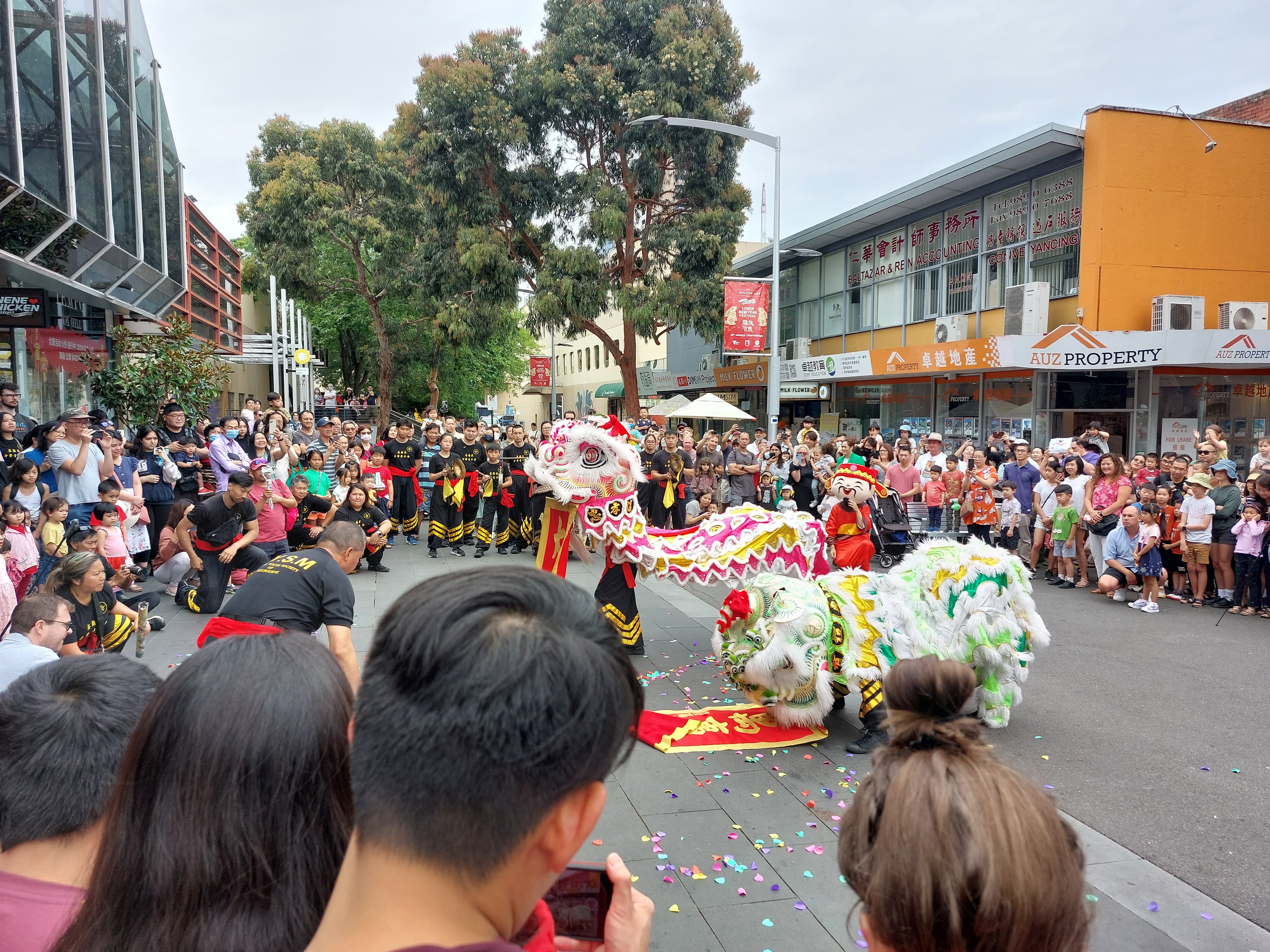
Chinese New Year celebration at Box Hill Chinatown

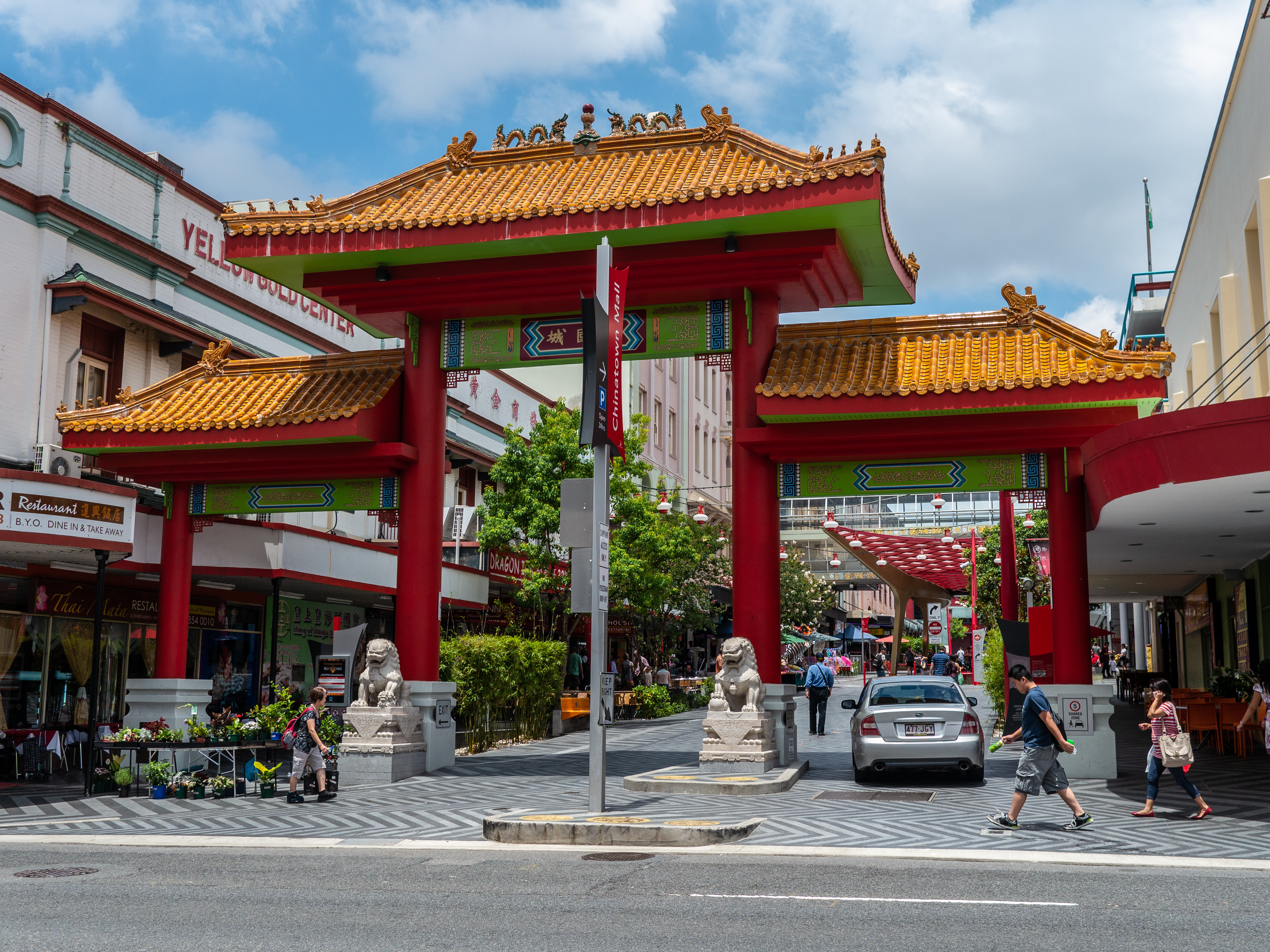
Brisbane Chinatown

=== Europe ===
Several urban Chinatowns exist in major European capital cities. There is Chinatown, London, England as well as major Chinatowns in Birmingham, Liverpool, Newcastle, and Manchester. Berlin, Germany has one established Chinatown in the area around Kantstrasse of Charlottenburg in the West. Antwerp, Belgium has also seen an upstart Chinese community, that has been recognized by the local authorities since 2011. The city council of Cardiff has plans to recognize the Chinese Diaspora in the city.

The Chinatown in Paris, located in the 13th arrondissement, is the largest in Europe, where many Vietnamese – specifically ethnic Chinese refugees from Vietnam – have settled and in Belleville in the northeast of Paris as well as in Lyon. In Italy, there is a Chinatown in Milan between Via Luigi Canonica and Via Paolo Sarpi and others in Rome and Prato. In the Netherlands, Chinatowns exist in Amsterdam, Rotterdam and the Hague.

The Chinatown in Liverpool is the oldest Chinese community in Europe. The Chinatown in London was established in the Limehouse district in the late 19th century. The Chinatown in Manchester is located in central Manchester.

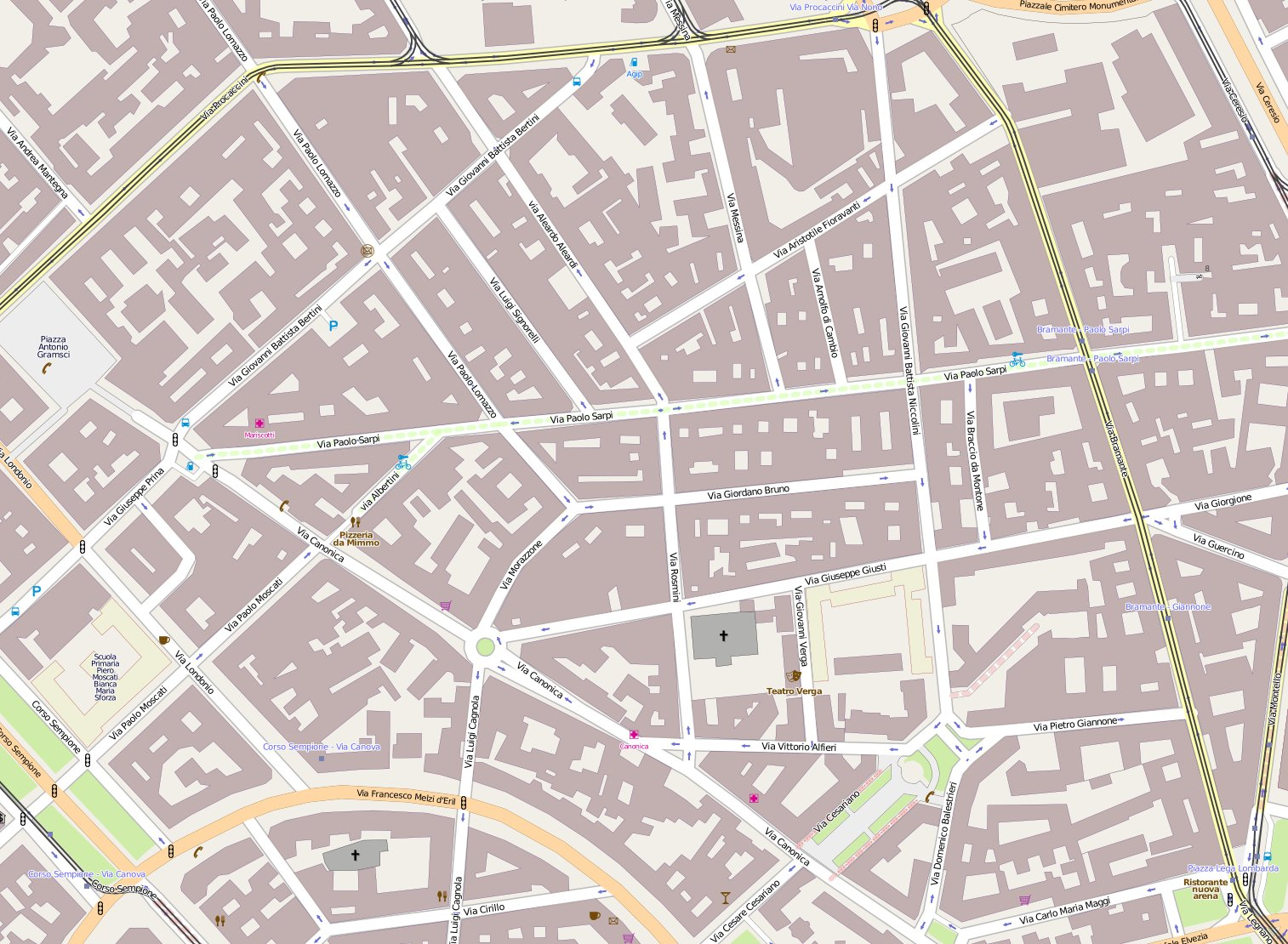
Map of Chinatown Milan

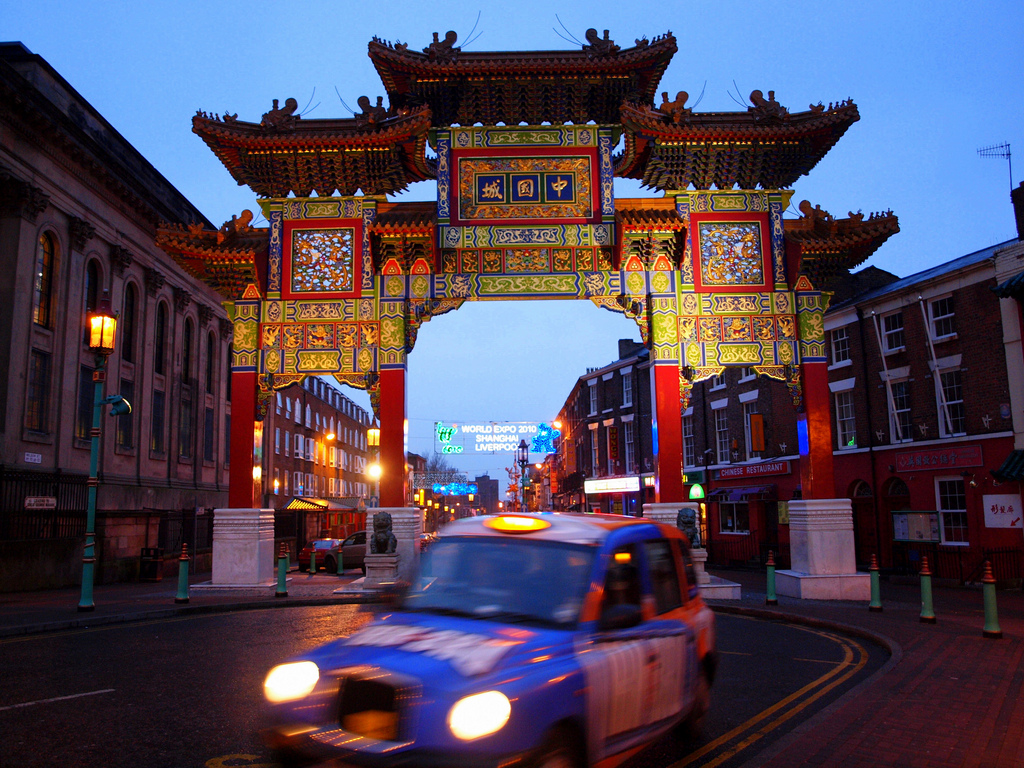
Gate of Chinatown, Liverpool England, is the largest multiple-span arch outside of China, in the oldest Chinese community in Europe.

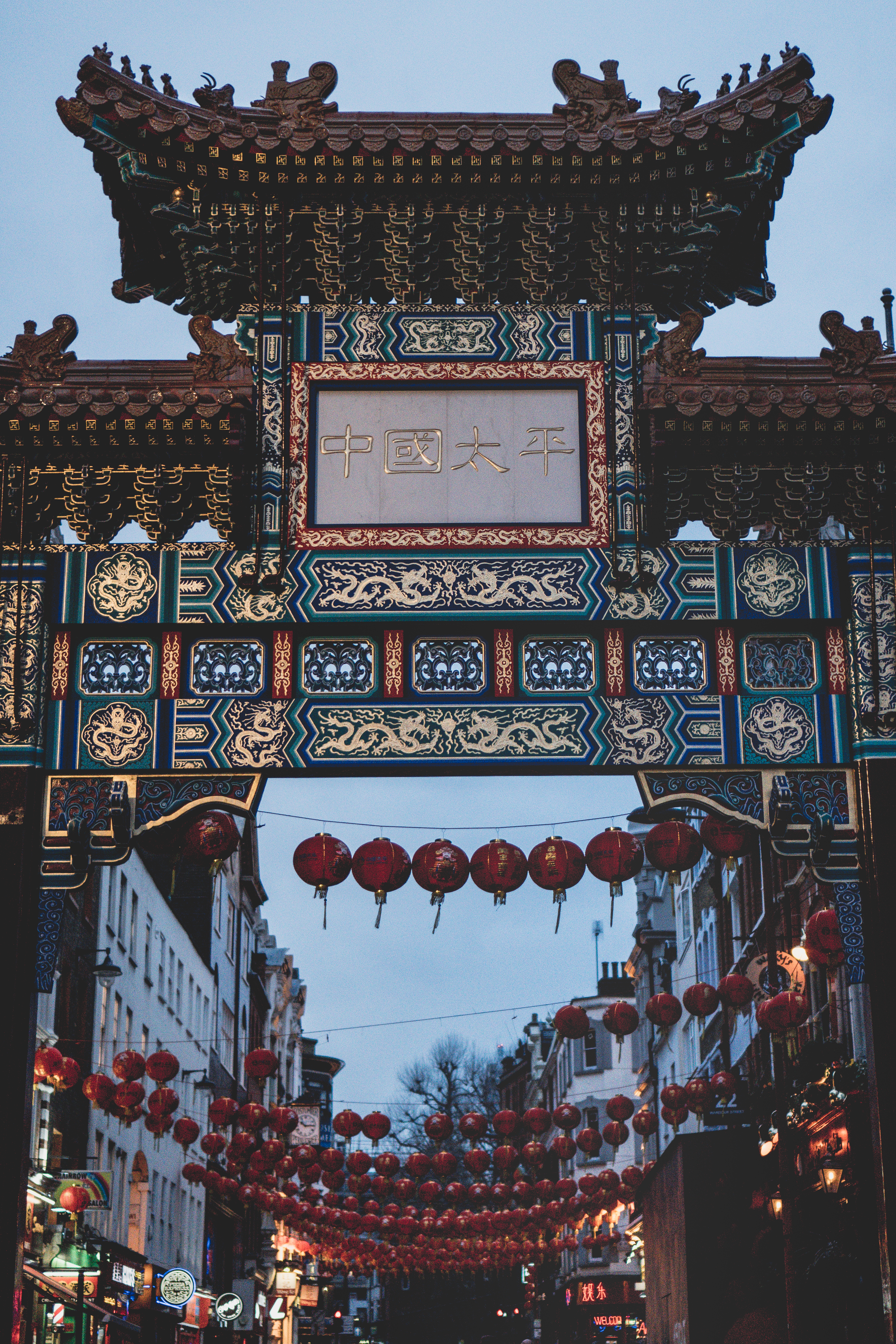
Wardour Street, Chinatown, London

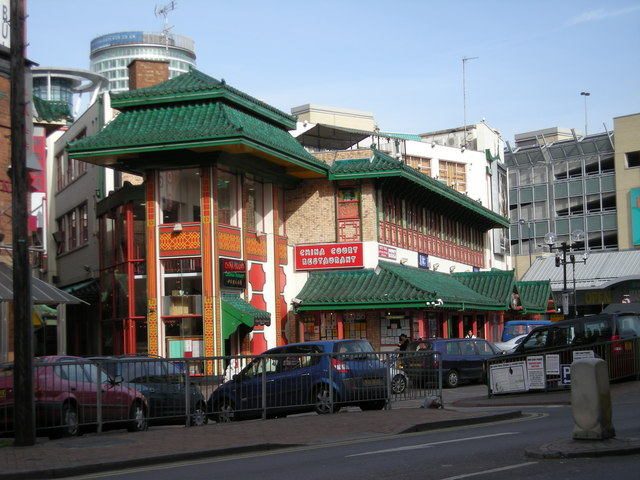
Chinese Quarter in Birmingham, England

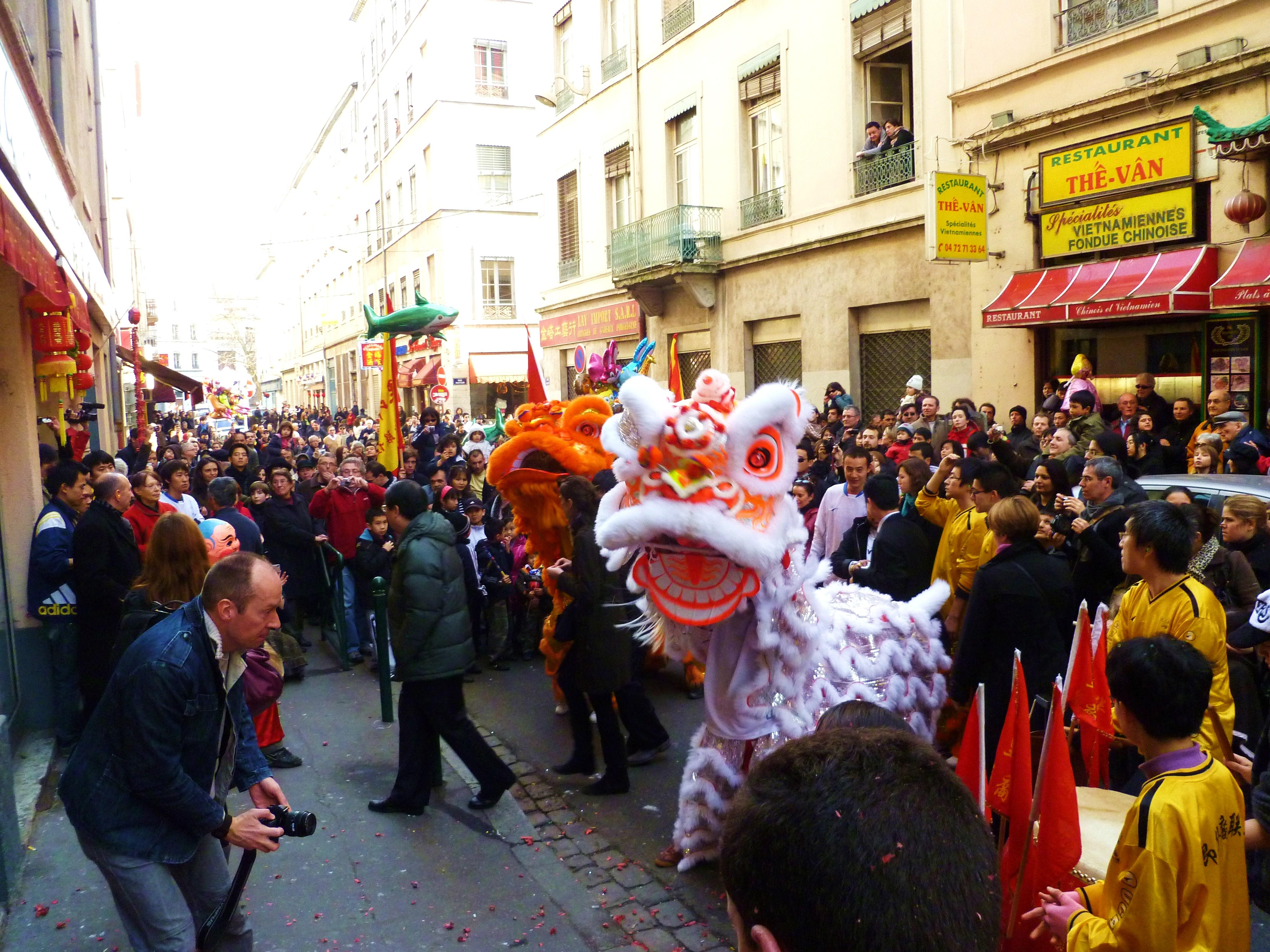
Chinese new year celebration in Lyon, France

== In popular culture ==
Chinatowns have been portrayed in various films including The Joy Luck Club, Big Trouble in Little China, Year of the Dragon, Flower Drum Song, The Lady from Shanghai and Chinatown. Within the context of the last film "Chinatown" is used primarily as an extended metaphor for any situation in which an outside entity seeks to intervene without having the local knowledge required to understand the consequences of that intervention. The neighborhood or district is often associated with being outside the normal rule of law or isolated from the social norms of the larger society.

Chinatowns have also been mentioned in the songs "Queen of Chinatown" by Amanda Lear and "Kung Fu Fighting" by Carl Douglas whose song lyrics says "... There was funky China men from funky Chinatown ..."

The martial arts actor Bruce Lee is well known as a person who was born in the Chinatown of San Francisco. Other notable Chinese Americans such as politician Gary Locke and NBA player Jeremy Lin grew up in suburbs with lesser connections to traditional Chinatowns. Neighborhood activists and politicians have increased in prominence in some cities, and some are starting to attract support from non-Chinese voters.

== Some notable temples in Chinatowns worldwide ==
- San Francisco's Chinatown – Tin How Temple (天后古廟), Ma-Tsu Temple (美國舊金山媽祖廟朝聖宮)
- Los Angeles Chinatown – Thien Hau Temple (天后宮)
- Yokohama Chinatown – Yokohama Ma Zhu Miao (横濱媽祖廟)
- Bangkok Chinatown – Leng Buai Ia Shrine (龍尾古廟), Wat Bamphen Chin Phrot (永福寺) & Wat Mangkon Kamalawat (龍蓮寺)
- Yangon Chinatown – Kheng Hock Keong (慶福宮) & Guanyin Gumiao Temple (觀音古廟)
- Jakarta Chinatown - Kim Tek Ie Temple (金德院)
- Kuala Lumpur Chinatown – Sin Sze Si Ya Temple (仙四師爺廟)
- Malacca Chinatown – Cheng Hoon Teng Temple (青云亭)
- Singapore Chinatown - Thian Hock Keng temple (天福宮)
- Terengganu Chinatown – Ho Ann Kiong Temple (护安宫) & Tian Hou Gong Temple (天后宮)
- Davao Chinatown – Lon Wa Buddhist Temple (龙华寺)

== See also ==
- Lists of Chinatowns
- List of U.S. cities with significant Chinese-American populations
- Ethnic enclave
