= Kuala Terengganu =

City in Malaysia

Kuala Terengganu Kole Tranung (Terengganu Malay)
- State capital city, royal capital and district capital
- City of Kuala Terengganu Bandaraya Kuala Terengganu (Malay)
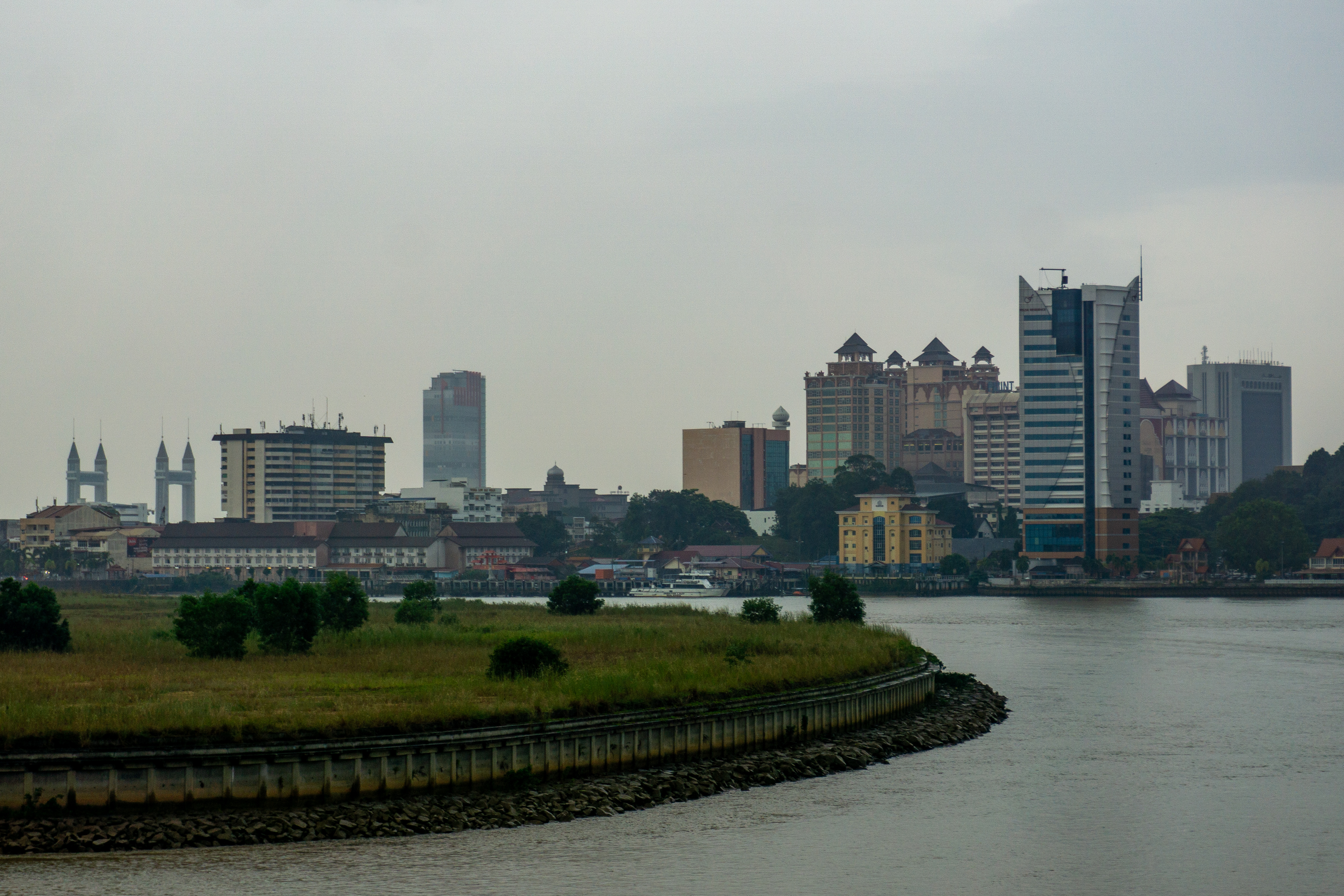
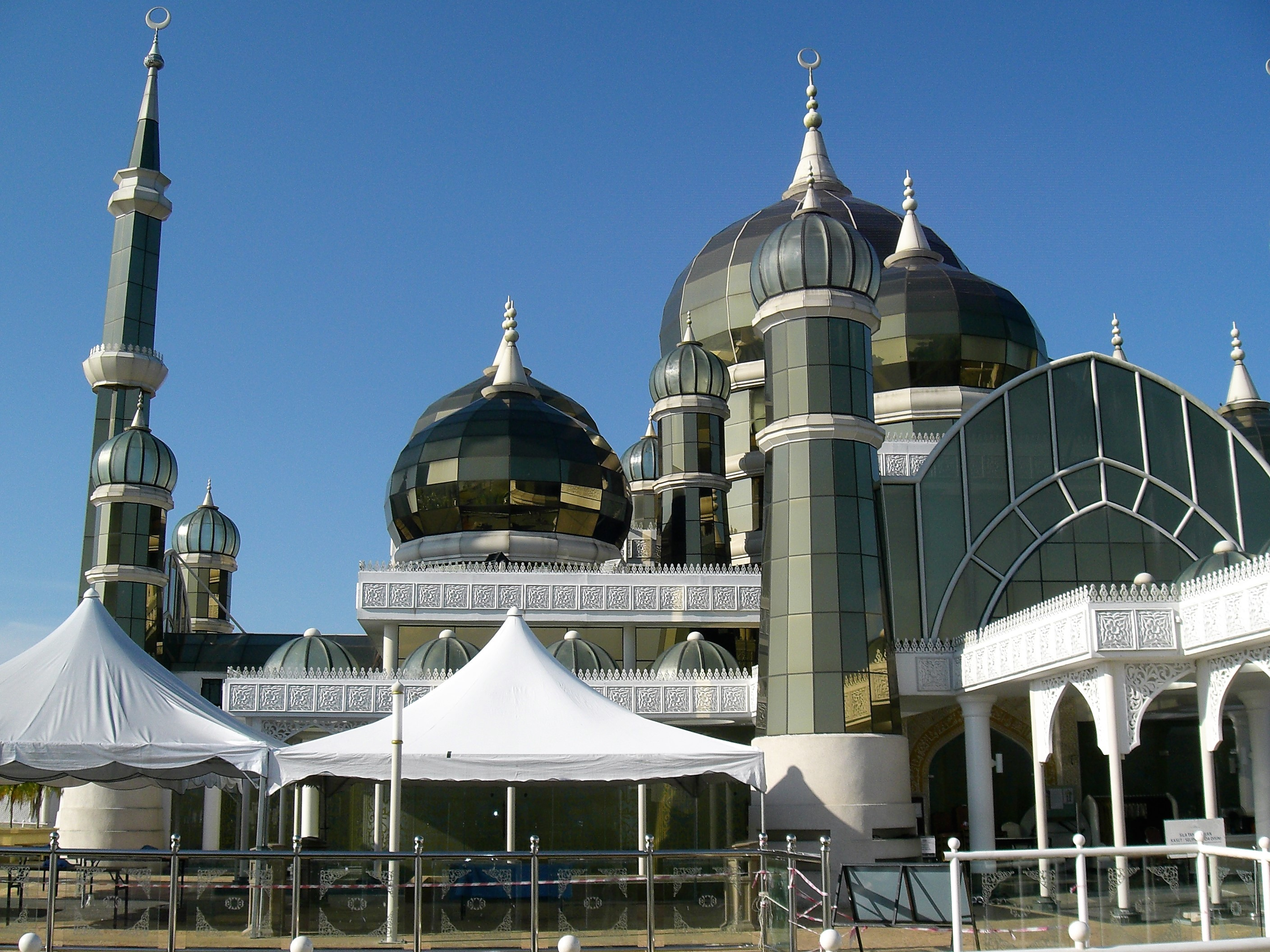
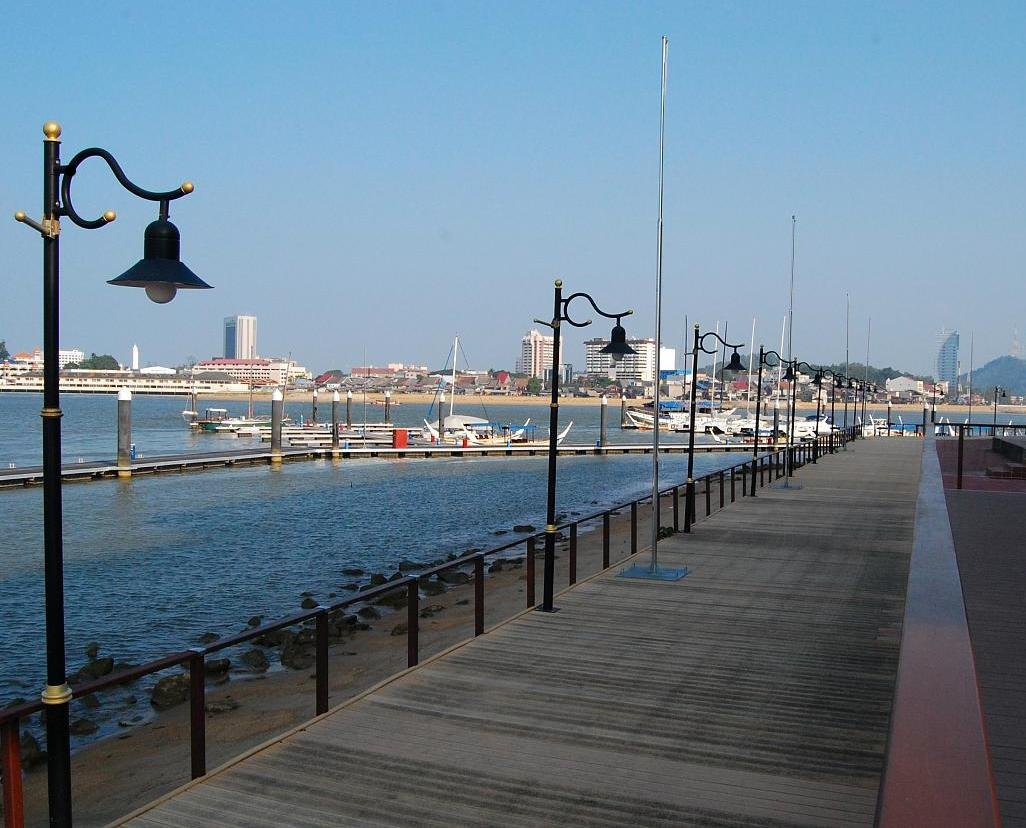
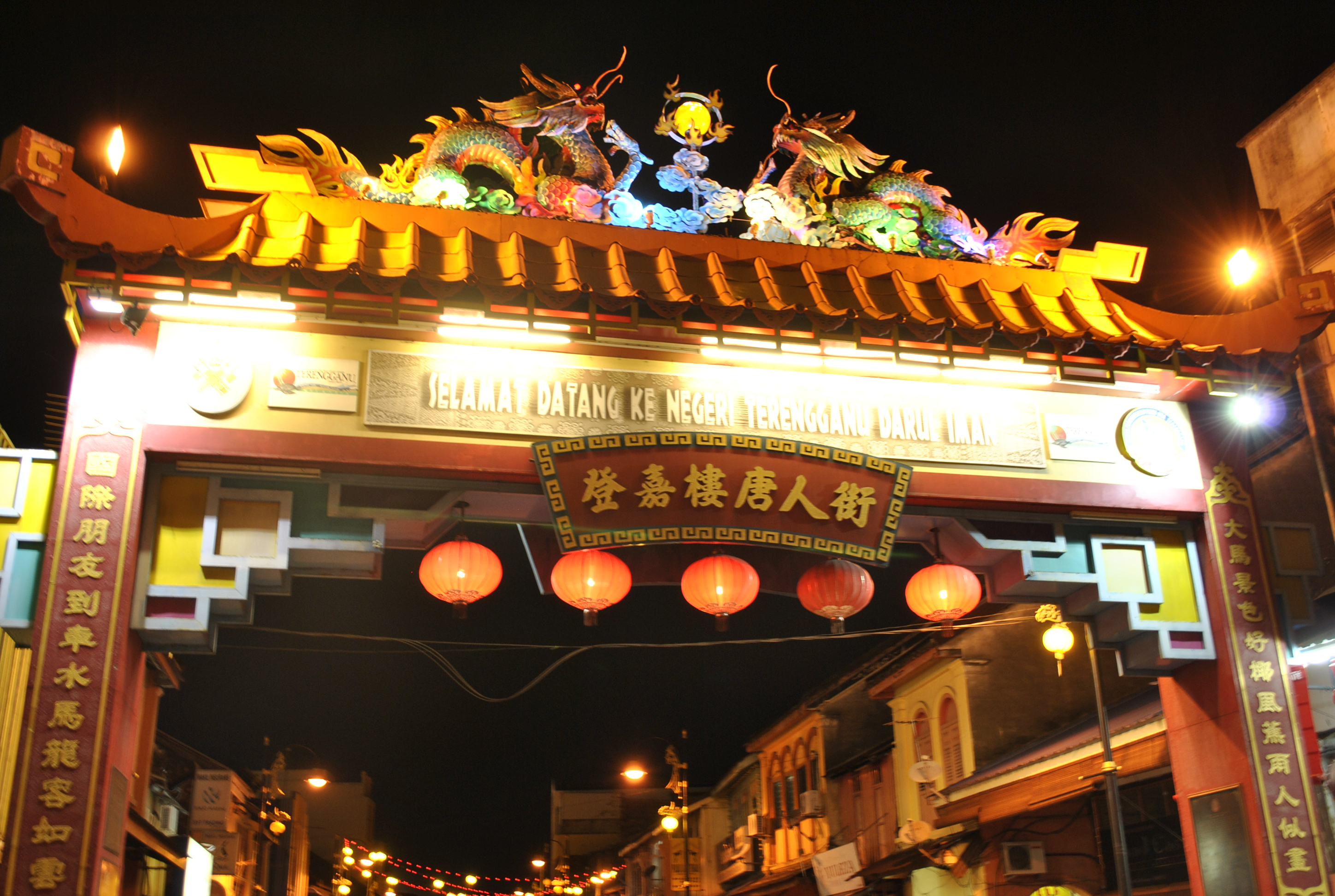
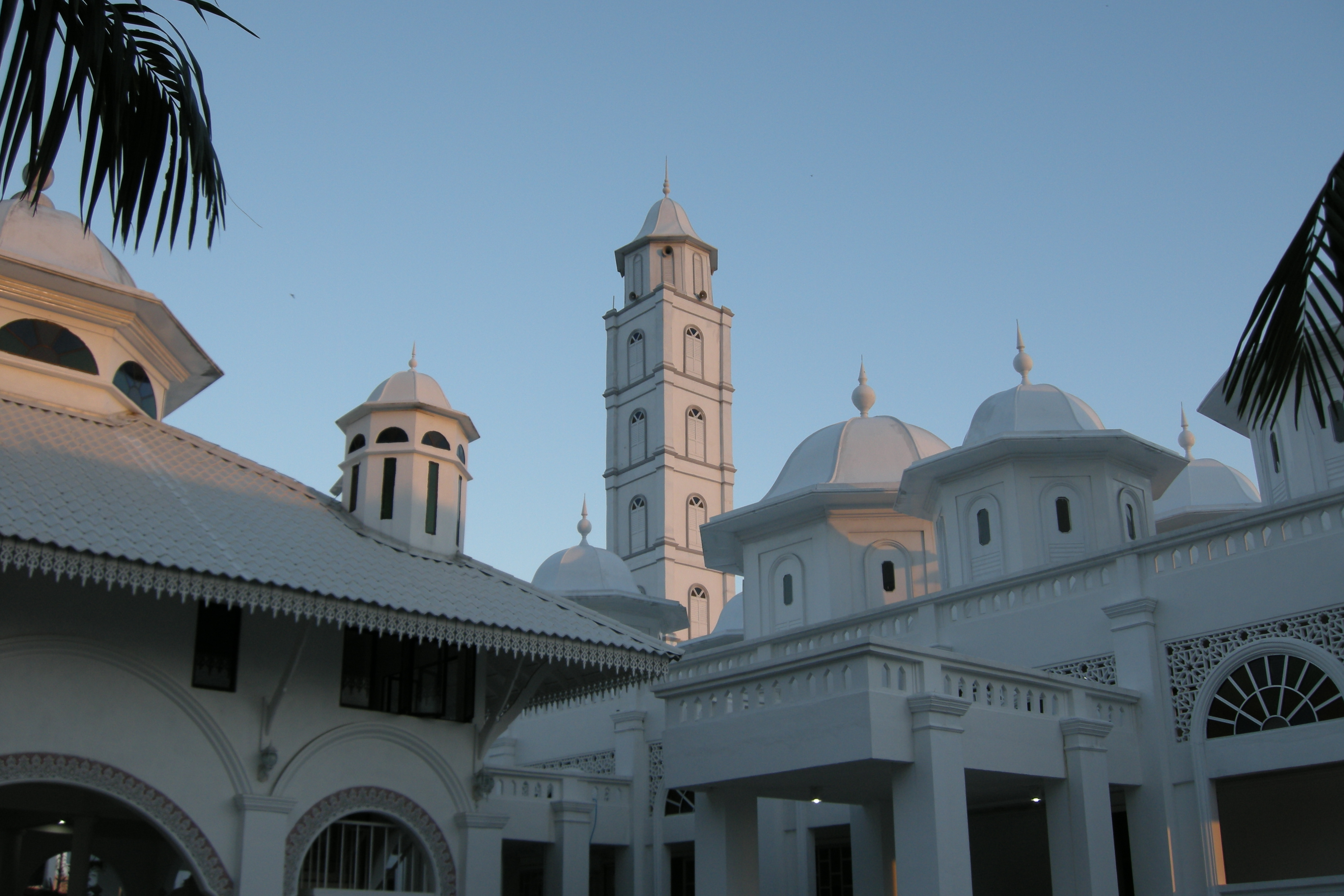
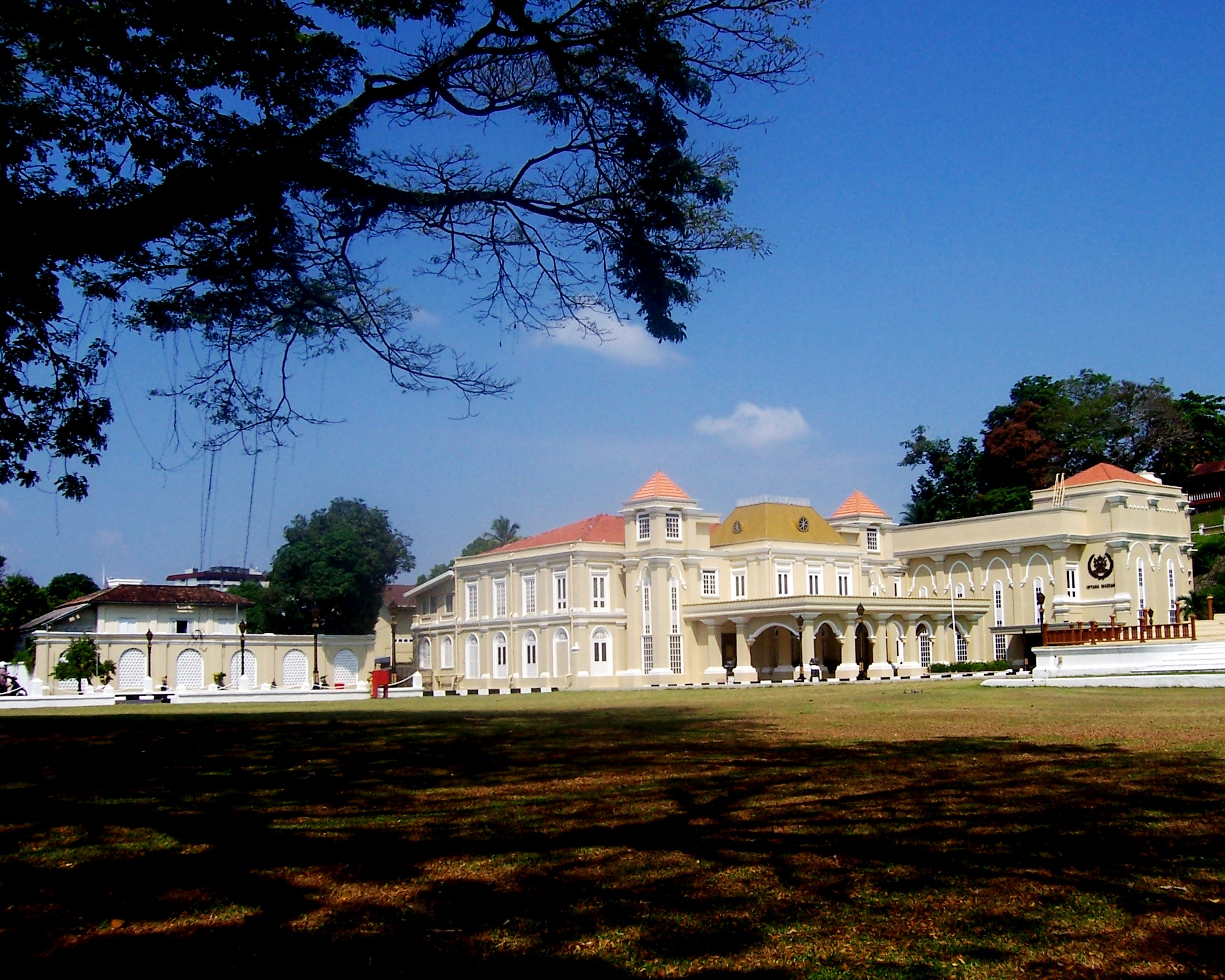
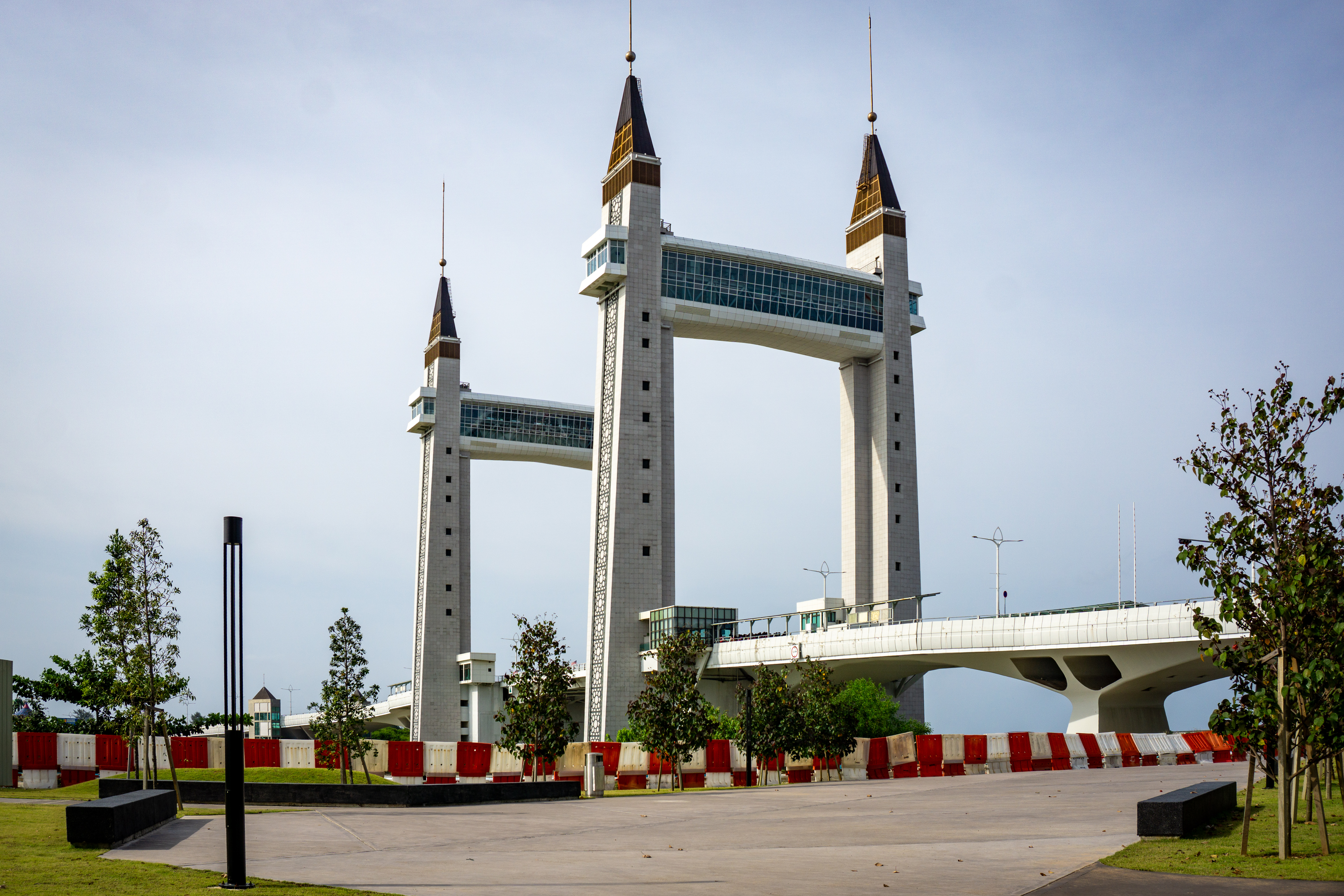
- Skyline and the Terengganu River Crystal Mosque City view from Duyong Island Chinatown Abidin Mosque Maziah Palace Kuala Terengganu Drawbridge

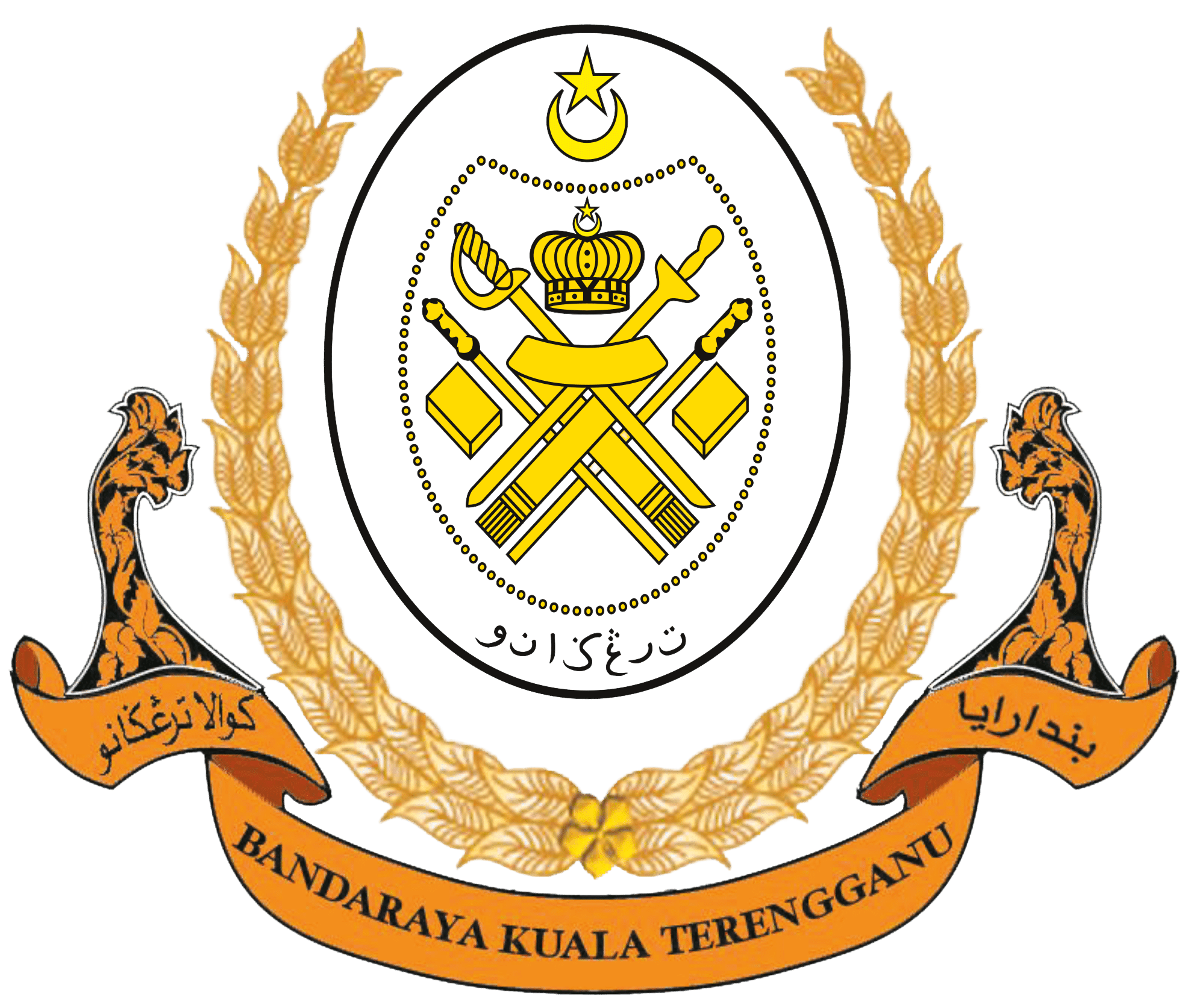
- Seal
- Nickname: KT
- Motto(s): Bandaraya Warisan Pesisir Air; English: Waterfront Heritage City
- Interactive map of Kuala Terengganu
- Kuala Terengganu in Terengganu Kuala Terengganu (Malaysia) Kuala Terengganu (Southeast Asia) Kuala Terengganu (Asia)
- Coordinates: 05°19′45″N 103°08′10″E
- Country: Malaysia
- State: Terengganu
- Districts: Kuala Terengganu District; Kuala Nerus District
- Administrative areas: Show areas: Atas Tol; Batu Buruk; Batu Rakit; Belara; Bukit Besar; Cabang Tiga; Cenering; Gelugur Kedai; Gelugur Raja; Kepung; Kuala Ibai; Kuala Nerus; Kubang Parit; Losong; Manir; Paluh; Pengadang Buluh; Pulau Redang; Pulau-Pulau; Rengas; Serada; Tuk Jamal
- Establishment of the local government: 1928
- Establishment of the Town Board: 1950
- Establishment of the Town Council: 1972
- Municipality status: 18 January 1979
- City status: 1 January 2008; 18 years ago

Government
  - Type: City council
  - Body: Kuala Terengganu City Council
  - Mayor: Tuan Haji Rosli bin Latif (since 5 June 2022)
  - MP: Rosol Wahid (Perikatan Nasional) (Hulu Terengganu) (since 9 May 2018); Abdul Hadi Awang (Perikatan Nasional) (Marang) (since 11 March 2008); Ahmad Amzad Hashim (Perikatan Nasional) (Kuala Terengganu) (since 9 May 2018); Alias Razak (Perikatan Nasional) (Kuala Nerus) (since 19 November 2022); Shaharizukirnain Abdul Kadir (Perikatan Nasional) (Setiu) (since 9 May 2018)

Area
  - Total: 605 km^{2} (234 sq mi)
- Elevation: 15 m (49 ft)

Population (2026)
  - Total: 410,500 (1st in Terengganu)
  - Density: 705/km^{2} (1,830/sq mi)
  - Demonym: Kuala Terengganuan
- Time zone: UTC+8 (MST)
  - Summer (DST): Not observed
- Postal code: 20xxx
- Area code(s): 09-6xxxxxxx
- Vehicle registration: T
- Website: mbkt.terengganu.gov.my

Kuala Terengganu (Malaysian pronunciation: [ˈkuˈala ˈtəˈrəŋˈganu]; Terengganu Malay: Kole Tranung), colloquially referred to as KT, is the administrative, economic and royal city of the state of Terengganu, Malaysia. Kuala Terengganu is also the seat of Kuala Terengganu District. It is also the only royal capital among the nine royal states of the country to bear its state's name. Kuala Terengganu is located about 440 kilometres (270 mi) northeast of Kuala Lumpur on the East Coast of Peninsular Malaysia. The city is situated at the estuary of Terengganu River, facing the South China Sea.

As a district, Kuala Terengganu is the smallest in terms of area, but it and Kuala Nerus District that together form the city area has the largest population in Terengganu. The city population was 406,317 in 2010 and declined to 375,424 in 2020. In 2026, the population climbed to 410,500. City status was awarded to Kuala Terengganu with the title Bandaraya Warisan Pesisir Air (English: Waterfront Heritage City) on 1 January 2008.

Besides being a major political and economic centre to the state, the city is also the main gateway to many of the state's tourist destinations. The attractions in and around the city include Kampung Cina, Pasar Besar Kedai Payang, Terengganu State Museum, and Batu Buruk Beach. Even though the city is not spared from modernity and development, Kuala Terengganu still retains strong Malay influences that are intermixed with other cultures from its long history as a port.

== Etymology ==
In Malay, kuala can have the meanings of "river mouth", "estuary", or "confluence". Thus, the name Kuala Terengganu is roughly translated as "the confluence/estuary of Terengganu", referring to the broad expanse of the Terengganu River estuary which empties into the South China Sea. There are several theories regarding the name Terengganu. One such theory attributes the name's origin to terang ganu, Malay for 'bright rainbow'. Another story, which is considered to be the most popular version, is said to have been originally narrated by the ninth Sultan of Terengganu, Baginda Omar. It tells of a party of hunters from Pahang roving and hunting in the area of what is now southern Terengganu. One of the hunters spotted a big animal fang lying on the ground. A fellow party member asked to which animal did the fang belong. The hunter, not knowing which animal, simply answered taring anu (Malay: 'fang of something'). The party later returned to Pahang with a rich hoard of game, fur and sandalwood, which impressed their neighbours. They asked the hunters where did they source their riches, to which they replied, from the land of taring anu, which later evolved into Terengganu.

== History ==
Among the earliest references of Terengganu are in Chinese historical sources. A Chinese writer's note during the Sui dynasty has mentioned about a state named Tan-Tan that sent tributes to China. The state was presumably located somewhere in Terengganu. Tan-Tan sent tributes to Sui dynasty and then to the Tang dynasty after Sui dynasty has collapsed. It ceased to send tributes to China after it came under the dominance of the Srivijaya during the 7th century. Chinese history books such as Lingwai Daida written by Zhou Qufei (周去非) in 1178 and the book Zhu fan zhi (also romanised as Chu-fanchi) written by Zhao Rugua (趙汝适; also romanised as Chau Ju-Kua) in 1226 mentioned Teng-ya-nu and Teng-ya-nung respectively, as being a vassal state of San-fo-ts'i (三佛齊), which is thought to be Srivijaya. After Srivijaya fell during the 13th century, Terengganu came under the influence of Majapahit. In the 15th century, Majapahit was vying with Ayutthaya Kingdom and the nascent Malacca Sultanate for the control of the Malay Peninsula. Malacca Sultanate prevailed and Terengganu then came under its influence. When the Malacca Sultanate fell in 1511 to the Portuguese, the newly established Sultanate of Johor exerted its influence on most of the former territories of the Malacca Sultanate, including Terengganu. Terengganu was briefly under the influence of the Aceh Sultanate during the early 17th century, but Johor managed to exert its influence again on Terengganu in the late 17th century.

=== Establishment of the Sultanate ===
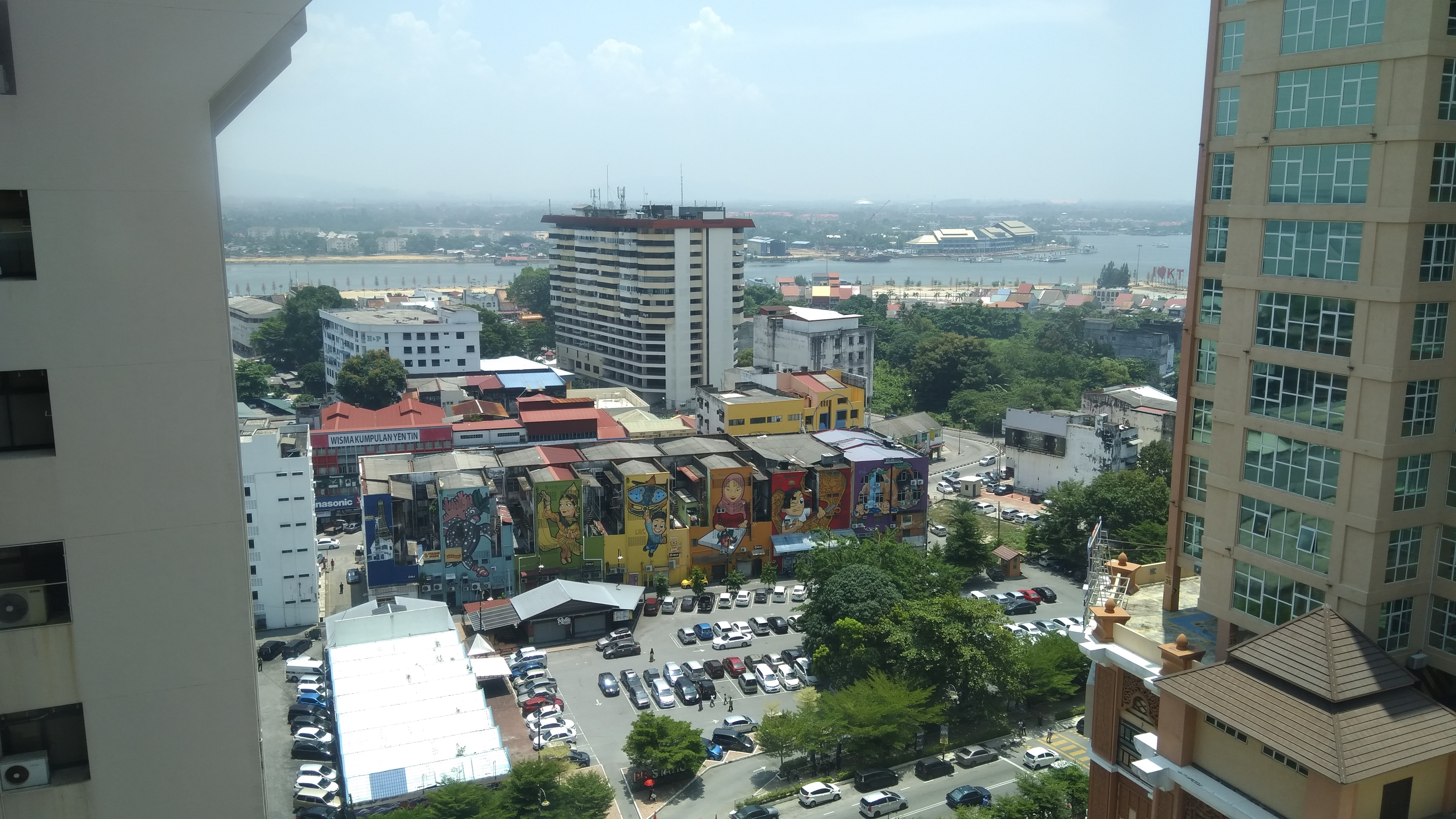
Jalan Banggol area seen from PB Square.

The present Sultanate of Terengganu was established in the 1708. The first Sultan of Terengganu, Sultan Zainal Abidin I established his court near Kuala Berang, then he moved his court a few more times until he settled near Bukit Keledang, Kuala Terengganu. During the early 18th century, Kuala Terengganu was still a small town. It was described as having about one thousand houses that were scattered around the town. The Chinese were already present in Kuala Terengganu at that time. Half of the population were Chinese and they were engaged in agriculture and trading. After the death of Sultan Daud in 1831, a brief civil war erupted between two claimants to the throne, namely Tengku Mansur and Tengku Omar. Tengku Omar was based at Bukit Puteri while Tengku Mansur was based at Balik Bukit. Tengku Omar was defeated by Tengku Mansur and he fled from Terengganu. Tengku Mansur became the next Sultan as Sultan Mansur II. His son, Sultan Muhammad succeeded him as the next Sultan after his death in 1837. However, in 1839, Tengku Omar returned to Terengganu with his entourage to reclaim the throne. He defeated Sultan Muhammad and forced Sultan Muhammad to flee. Tengku Omar reoccupied his fort at Bukit Puteri and was throned as the next Sultan, Sultan Omar.

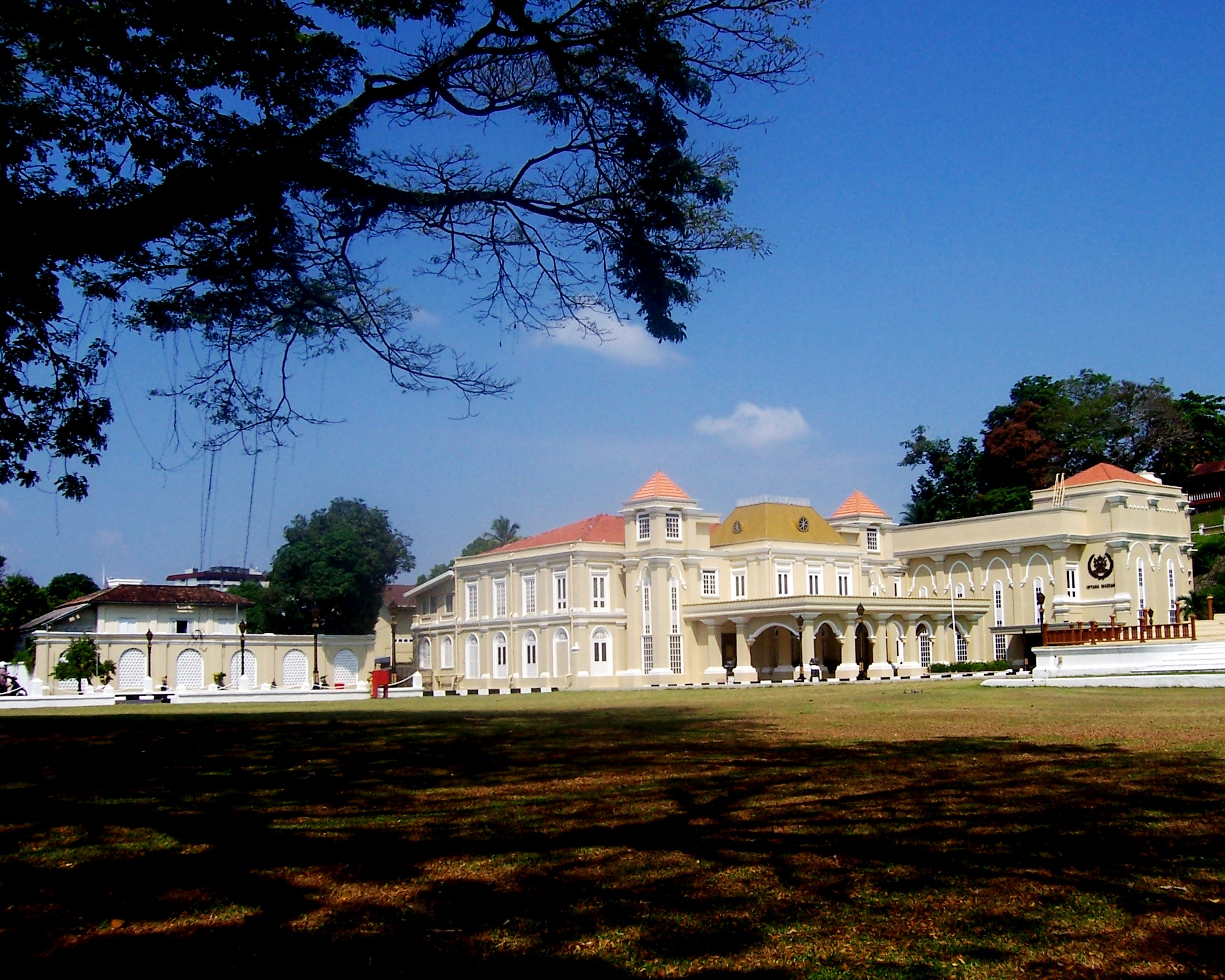
Maziah Palace was built to replace the old Green Palace, which was destroyed by fire in 1882.

In 1862, ex-Sultan of Riau-Lingga, Sultan Mahmud IV Muzaffar Shah went to Terengganu from Bangkok on a Siamese vessel. The British requested that the ex-Sultan to be withdrawn because the British accused the ex-Sultan and also the Sultan of Terengganu, Sultan Omar of supporting Wan Ahmad. Wan Ahmad had constantly attacked Pahang using Kemaman as his base and British trade there were disrupted by the constant attacks. The Siamese agreed to British request, but they have yet to follow through with their agreement. The Strait Settlements Governor, Sir Orfeur Cavenagh sent three ships, HMS Scout, HMS Coquette and a steamer Tonze to Kuala Terengganu, under the command of Captain Corbett, accompanied by Major MacPherson. They were sent with orders to compel the ex-Sultan of Riau-Lingga to be sent back by the British to Siam, and to call upon the Sultan to cease supporting Wan Ahmad. After the Sultan of Terengganu declined to surrender the ex-Sultan to the British, the ships bombarded Kuala Terengganu. The Sultan of Terengganu and the ex-Sultan had fled Kuala Terengganu during the bombardment. The ships then returned to Singapore. Kuala Terengganu was ravaged by a fire in August 1883. The fire that swept through Kuala Terengganu destroyed many buildings, including Green Palace (Istana Hijau), the Sultan's palace. Maziah Palace (Istana Maziah) was later built to replace the destroyed palace.

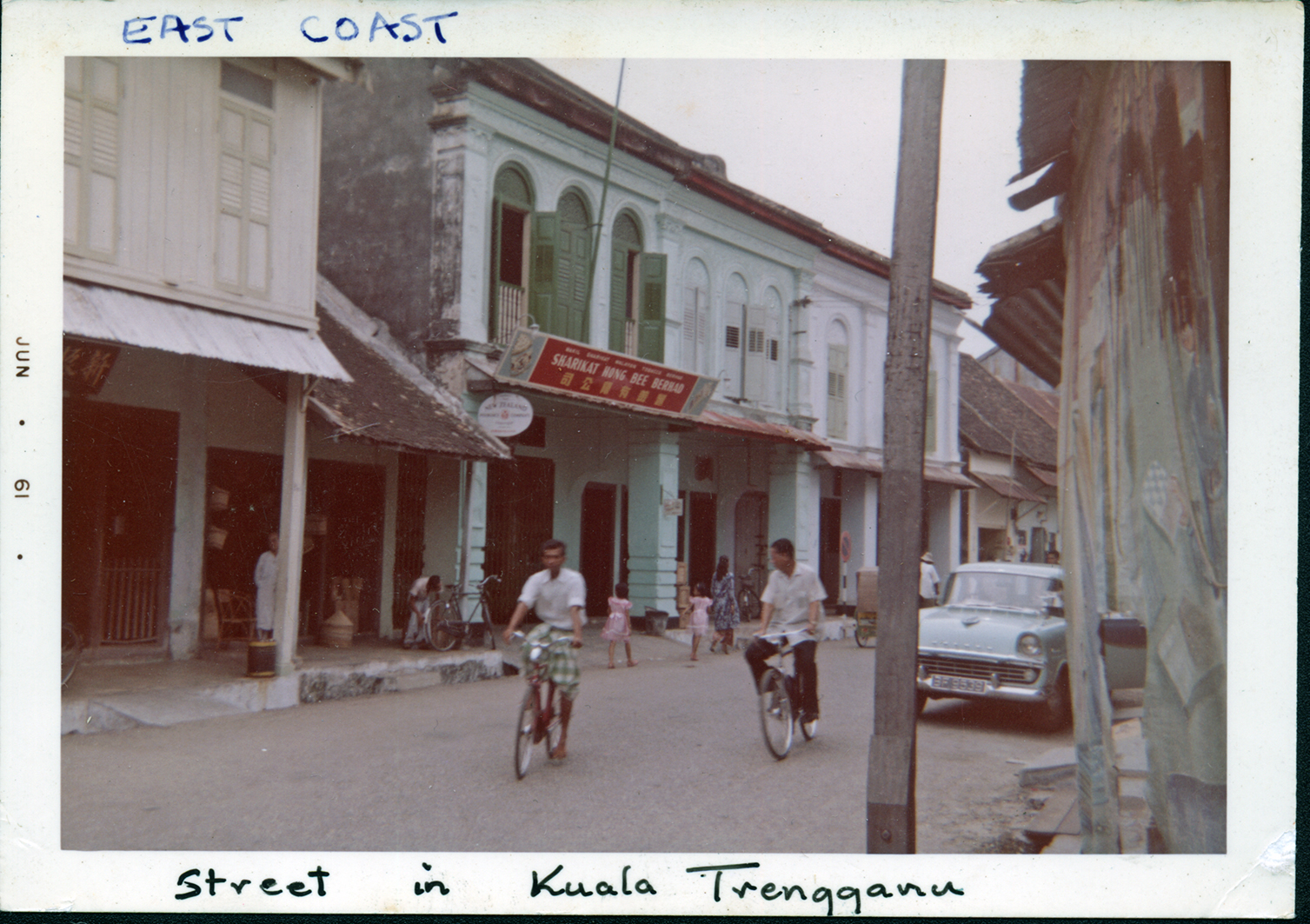
Street in Kuala Terengganu in June 1961 with a Chinese shop on the background.

Kuala Terengganu continued to be Terengganu's capital when it was still a vassal state of Siam and during the early years of British colonisation of Malaya.

=== British Colonial Period ===
Terengganu fell under the administration of Britain through the Bangkok Treaty of 1909 and was forced to accept a resident "British advisor". Terengganu, along with four other states were grouped under the term of Unfederated Malay States. British maintained its rule on Terengganu until the Japanese occupation in World War II.

=== World War II ===
On 18 December 1941, Japanese forces from Kota Bahru would advance towards Kuala Terengganu. On 18 October 1943, Terengganu was annexed by Thailand as part of an agreement with the Japanese. After the war, the British regained control of Terengganu.

=== Modern History ===
In 1957, Malaya achieved its independence, and subsequently in 1963, Malaya, North Borneo (now the state of Sabah), Sarawak, and Singapore merge to form Malaysia. On 18 January 1979, Kuala Terengganu Municipal Council was established to oversee the development of the town. The Municipal Council was upgraded to Kuala Terengganu City Council on 1 January 2008.

== Governance ==
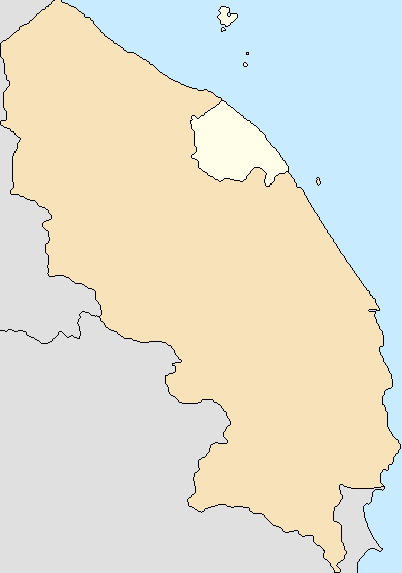
Locations of Kuala Terengganu and its suburbs

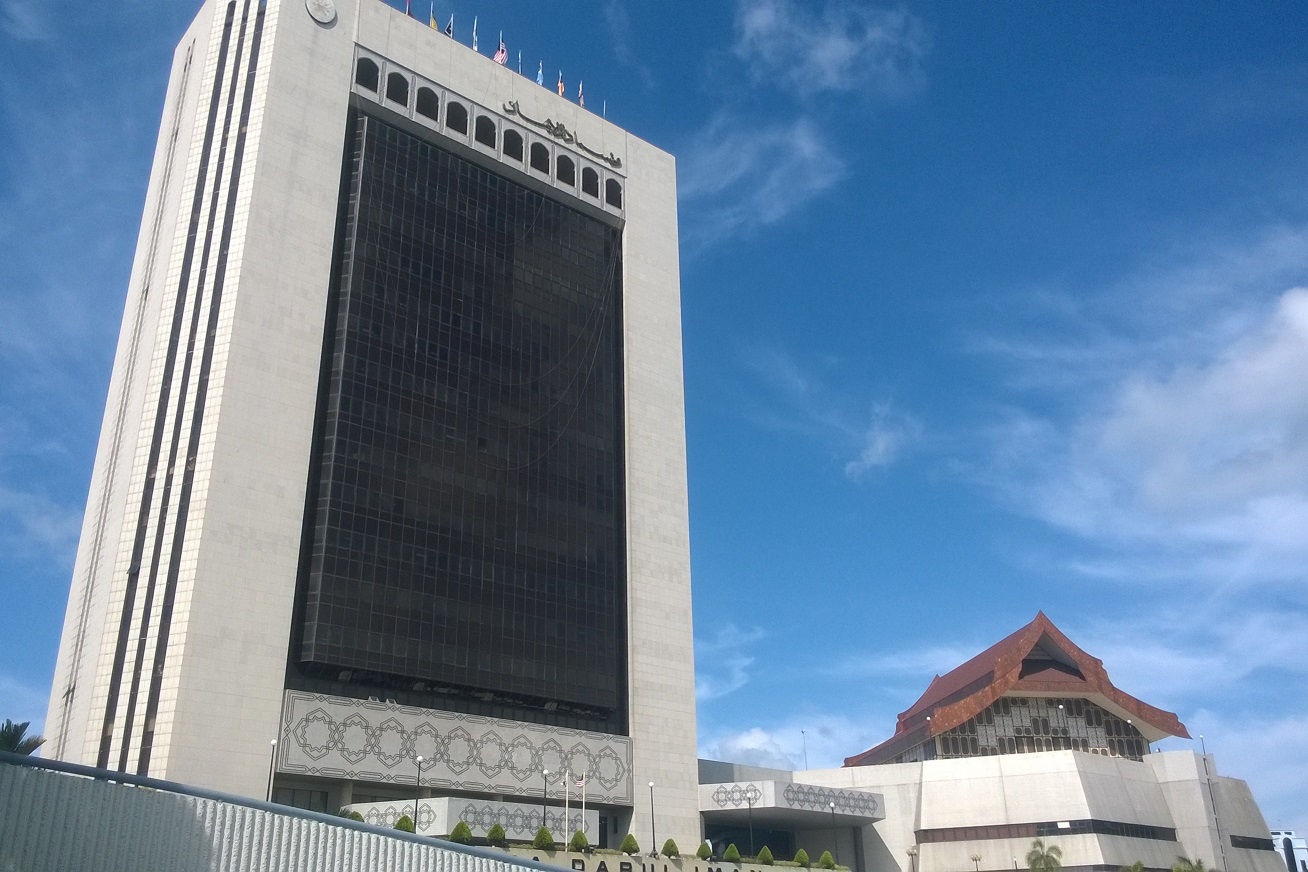
The State Secretariat building, Wisma Darul Iman, houses the Legislative Assembly of Terengganu and the Office of Mentri Besar.

The city is administered by Kuala Terengganu City Council, which covers the whole area of Kuala Terengganu district as well as Kuala Nerus district. The district's location at the estuary of Terengganu River divided the district into two parts, Kuala Terengganu Utara (North Kuala Terengganu), now known as Kuala Nerus, and Kuala Terengganu Selatan (South Kuala Terengganu), which is considered to be Kuala Terengganu proper. As the capital, the city is vital to the political and economic welfare of the state. It is the centre for the state and federal government agencies administration buildings, housing the offices of many ministries' departments and governmental bodies, such as the Immigration and Customs Department, State Economic Planning Unit, Pos Malaysia Kuala Terengganu General Post Office, Terengganu State Library, and many others. As the administrative capital of Terengganu, the Legislative Assembly convenes at Wisma Darul Iman, the state secretariat building. Kuala Terengganu is also the royal capital of the state, being the site of the Sultan's many palaces, for example Istana Badariah and Istana Maziah.

The Election Commission of Malaysia has divided Kuala Terengganu into eleven state assembly districts which covers the constituencies of Hulu Terengganu, Marang, Setiu, Kuala Nerus and Kuala Terengganu, which are:

- N8 – Batu Rakit
- N9 – Tepuh
- N10 – Buluh Gading
- N11 – Seberang Takir
- N12 – Bukit Tunggal
- N13 – Wakaf Mempelam
- N14 – Bandar
- N15 – Ladang
- N16 – Batu Buruk
- N17 – Alur Limbat
- N22 – Manir

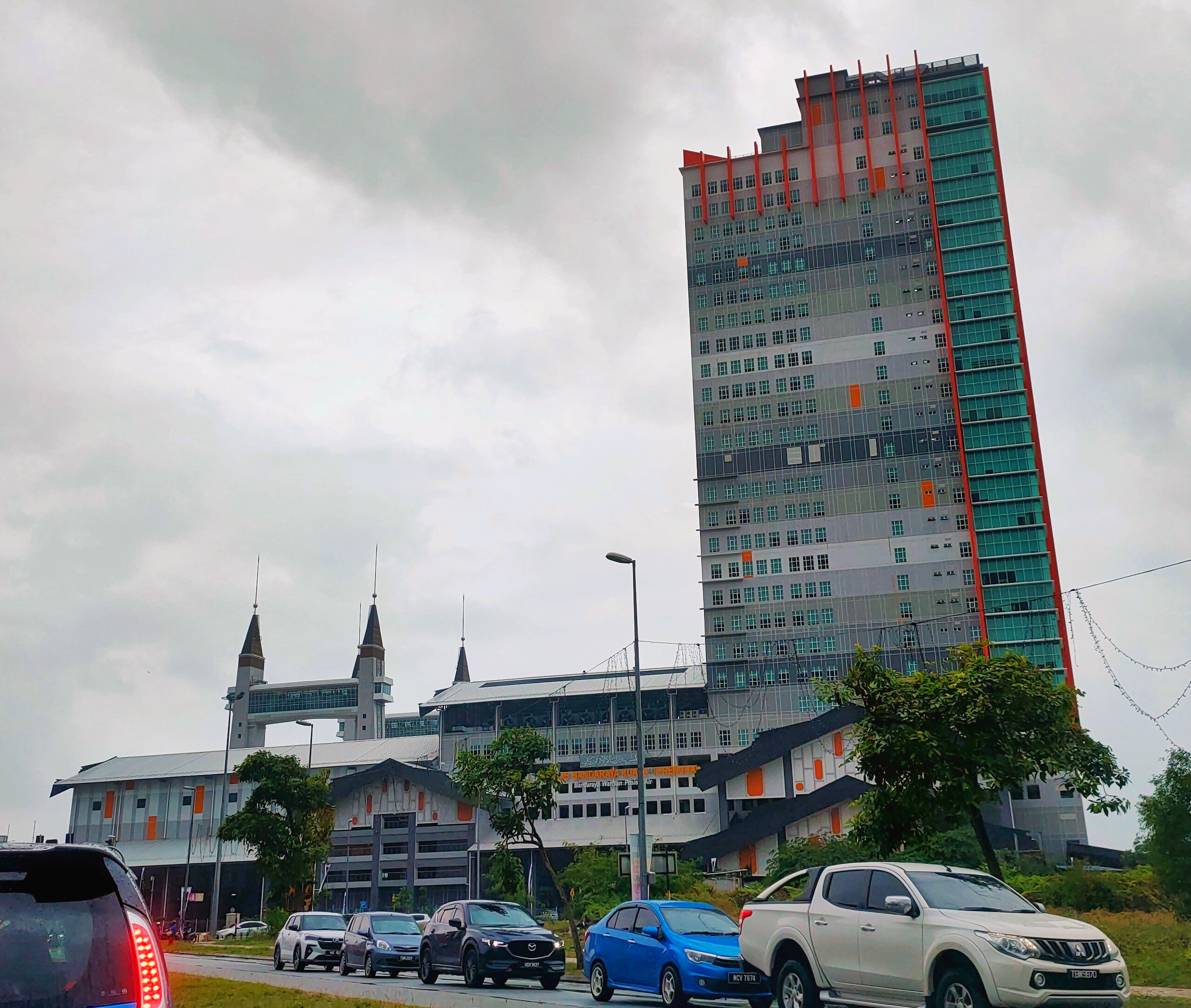
Menara MBKT (MBKT Tower) is the headquarters of Kuala Terengganu City Council. This 129.8-metre tall building has 31 floors and is the tallest building in the East Coast of Peninsular Malaysia.

Kuala Terengganu was first designated as a local government area in 1928 through the Municipal and Health Enactment 1928. At this time, the area only covered a small part of the current city border, specifically the historic core around the river mouth. The area, nevertheless, was enlarged slowly. In 1950, the town was administered by Kuala Terengganu Town Board under section 51(1), the Local Authority Election Ordinance 1950. Like many other town boards at that time, the process of town planning was carried out according to the Town Board Enactment 1930. Until 1979, the town continued to be managed by Kuala Terengganu Town Board that governed an area of 5.4 square miles (1,398.6 hectares), with a population of around 53,300 people. Kuala Terengganu Municipal Council (MPKT) was established due to the development that spilled over to the areas outside the jurisdiction of the former Town Board. MPKT was established on 18 January 1979 under the enforcement of the Local Government Act 1976. MPKT was created through the amalgamation of Kuala Terengganu Town Board and four local councils (North KT, South KT, West KT, and Central KT) with an area of 18,712 hectares covering 21 mukim or sub-districts, including some parts of Northern Kuala Terengganu.

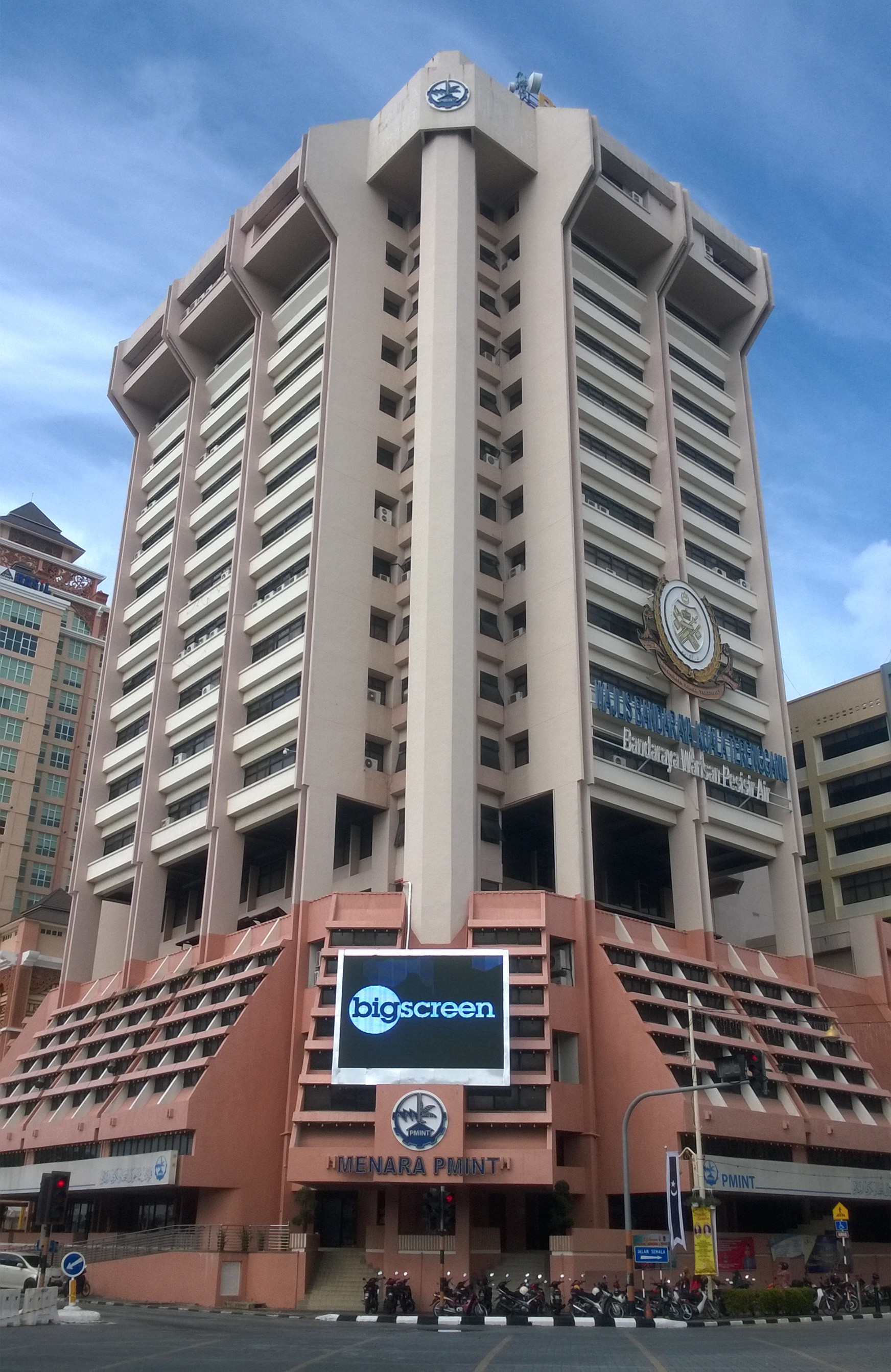
PMINT Tower houses Terengganu State Economic Development Corporation (PERMINT). It was formerly the headquarters for Kuala Terengganu City Council.

On 1 January 1985, the sub-districts of Bukit Palos and Alor Limbat were removed from the council and placed under the administration of Marang District Council. With these changes, the area under the council's administration was reduced to 16,806 hectares. On 16 December 1996, Kuala Terengganu Municipal Council was extended to cover the entire area of Kuala Terengganu district back then, including the resort island, Redang Island. With that, the number of the sub-districts increased to 23 while the area increased dramatically to 60,528 hectares. On 1 January 2008, a declaration was made by the state government and Kuala Terengganu became the first city on the East Coast region of Peninsular Malaysia to achieve city status. Kuala Terengganu Municipal Council changed its name to Kuala Terengganu City Council (MBKT) to reflect the change of its status. On 18 September 2014, the northern part of Kuala Terengganu (formerly called as Northern Kuala Terengganu) was declared as the state's newest district with the name of Kuala Nerus. This however does not mean a creation of a new local government area as Kuala Nerus is still under the jurisdiction of MBKT.

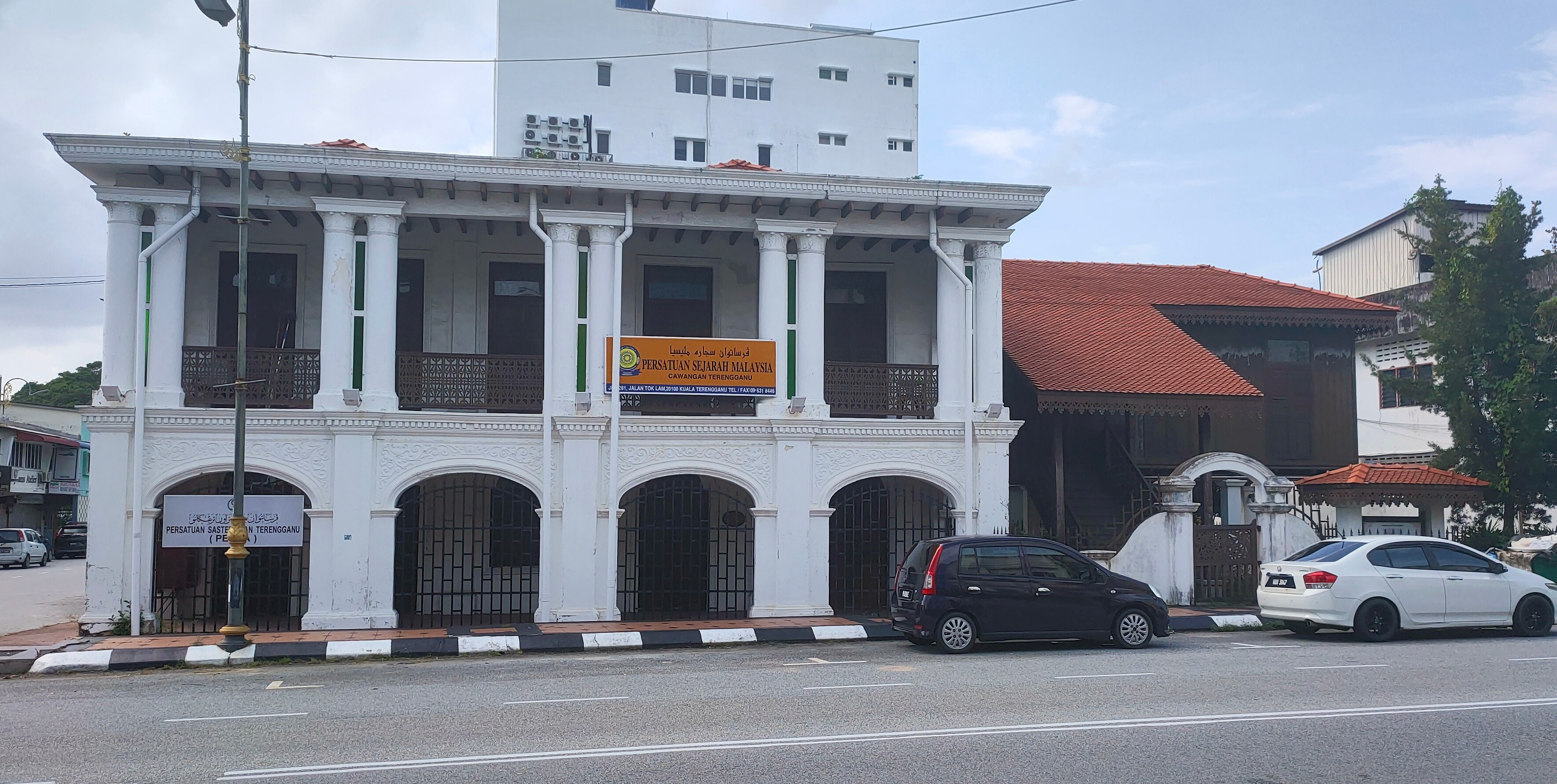
This century-old building represents a type of traditional Terengganu architecture known as Rumah Limas. It was formerly the head office of Terengganu Religious Affairs Department and later, Kuala Terengganu Town Board. It now houses the Persatuan Sejarah Malaysia (Malaysian Historical Society), Terengganu Branch.

As the local council for the districts of Kuala Terengganu and Kuala Nerus, and an agency under the Terengganu state government, MBKT is responsible for public health and sanitation, waste removal and management, town planning and beautification, environmental protection and building control, social, economic and tourism development, and general maintenance and constructions of urban infrastructure. The MBKT main headquarters is located at Menara Permint in Jalan Sultan Ismail. There are two districts that are administered by MBKT. They are Kuala Terengganu and Kuala Nerus. Kuala Nerus was formerly a part of Kuala Terengganu district, but on 18 September 2014, the sixth Malaysian Prime Minister, Datuk Seri Najib Tun Razak declared this northern part of Kuala Terengganu district as the eighth and newest district in Terengganu state.

With a population or over 300,000 and a size of 39,890 hectares, it comprises a substantial part of the former larger Kuala Terengganu district. Significant development in the areas of higher education and housing projects have occurred there in contemporary times. The main population centres of Kuala Nerus include Gong Badak and Batu Rakit. Among major education institutions located in this district are Universiti Malaysia Terengganu, Universiti Sultan Zainal Abidin, The Institute of Teacher Education Dato Razali Ismail Campus and an industrial training institute. The Universiti Sultan Zainal Abidin (UniSZA) Teaching Hospital is now under construction, thus providing this district with a new establishment. The Sultan Mahmud Airport is located within the district, as is the multipurpose Sultan Mizan Zainal Abidin Stadium. Although Kuala Nerus and Kuala Terengganu are now two districts on their own, since both of them are under the administration of the same local government, this makes MBKT among the few local governments in Malaysia to manage two different districts e.g. Alor Setar, Penang Island and Seberang Perai.

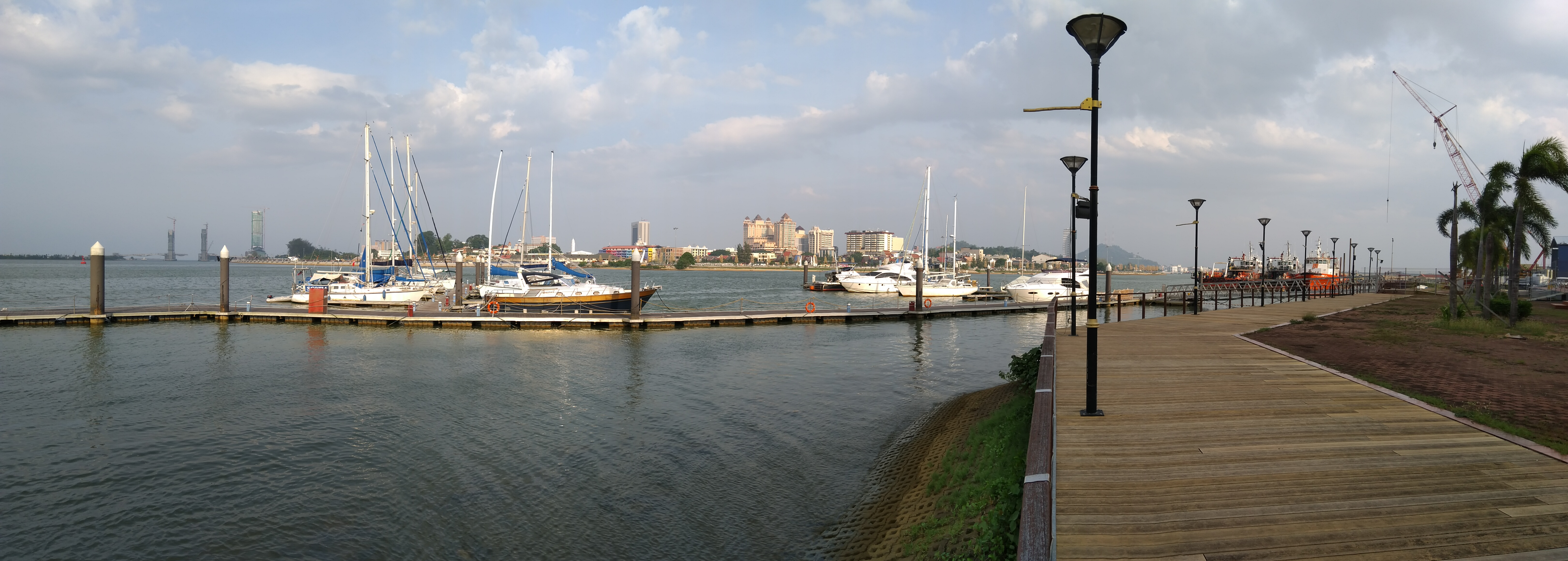
The view of Kuala Terengganu and Terengganu River estuary from Duyong Marina & Resort.

== Geography ==
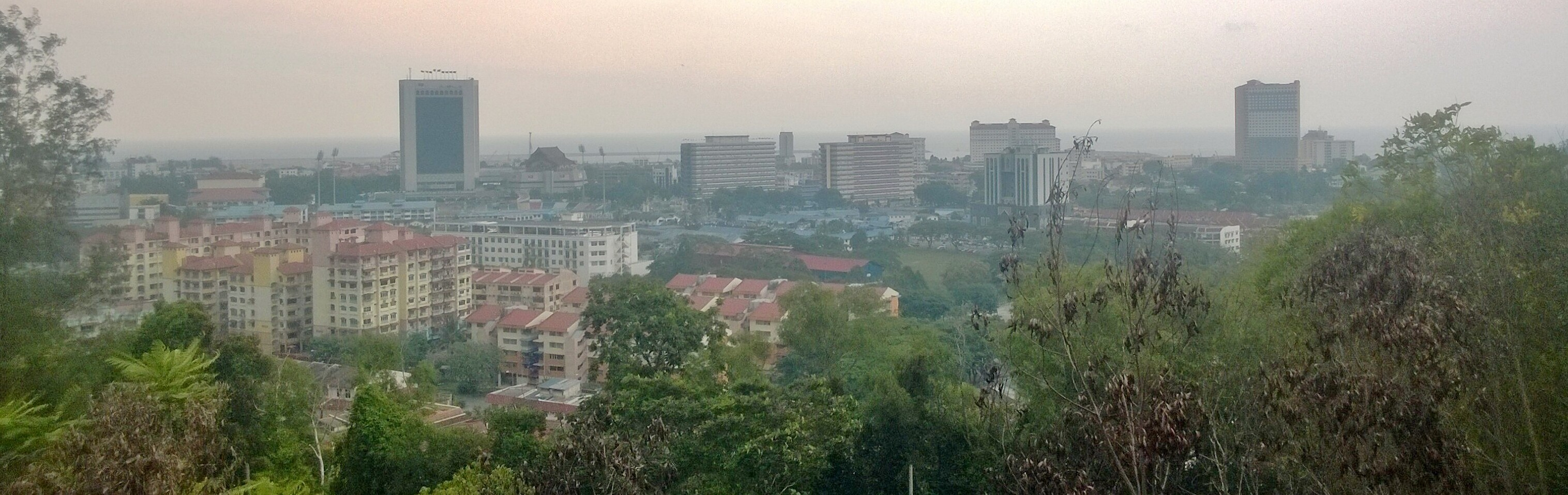
The city view from the top of Bukit Panorama, a hillside recreational area.

The eastern part of Terengganu district that faces the South China Sea is characterised by sandy coastal beaches that cover the entire stretch of both parts. Small bays and coastal plains can be found. The district is divided into four major drainage basins: Terengganu River basin, Nerus River basin, Ibai River basin, and other small rivers basin. Certain parts of the rivers of Kuala Terengganu are lined with swamp forests. Hills between 200 and 600 metres mostly dominate the western part of the district, with more than 70% of the district made up of lowlands less than 20 metres high because of its geographical proximity to the coast. The city itself has a few high points with the highest being Bukit Besar, followed by Bukit Kecil. Bukit Puteri is centrally located in the city, just near the Terengganu River estuary. The lowlands provide the district with suitable areas for plantations such as paddy, palm oil trees, and rubber trees.

=== Climate ===
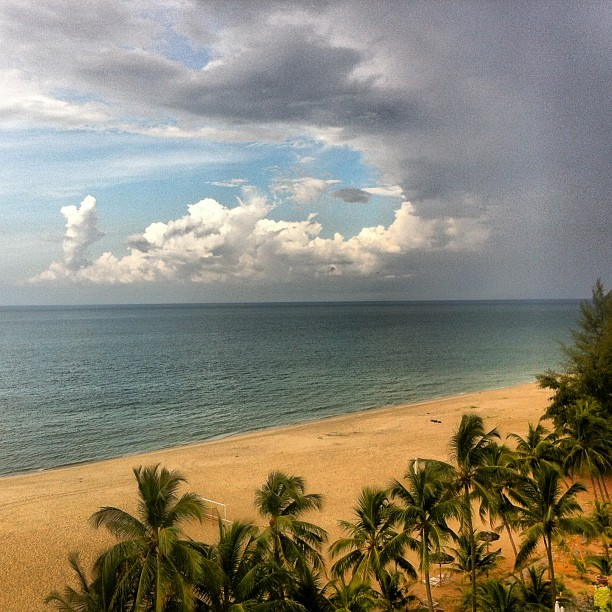
Sea view of Kuala Terengganu with tropical rainforest climate.

As a part of Terengganu, Kuala Terengganu has a tropical rainforest climate under the Köppen climate classification (Af) with constant temperature and high humidity. The amount of rainfall varies according to the monsoon season. It is generally fairly hot and humid all year round, averaging from 28 °C to 30 °C in daytime and slightly cooler after dusk. Nevertheless, the sea breeze from South China Sea somehow moderates the humidity in offshore areas while the altitude and lush forest trees and plant has cooled the mountain and rural areas.

There are two main types of monsoons in the state. The southwest monsoon season is usually established in the later half of May or early June and ends in September. The prevailing wind flow is generally southwesterly and light, below 15 knots. The northeast monsoon season usually starts in early November and ends in March. During this season, steady easterly or northeasterly winds of 10 to 20 knots prevail. The winds over the east coast states of Peninsular Malaysia may reach 30 knots or more during periods of strong surges of cold air from the north (cold surges). The annual rainfall of this area is 2,911 millimetres. During the northeast monsoon season, Kuala Terengganu, being exposed to the coast, receives heavy rainfall. It is not advised to visit any of the offshore islands or participating in sea activities as the sea can be very rough. However, in some clear sunny days during the monsoon season, surprisingly east coast is always presented with clear blue sky and cooling wind.

Climate data for Kuala Terengganu (Sultan Mahmud Airport) (2007–2020 normals)
Month	Jan	Feb	Mar	Apr	May	Jun	Jul	Aug	Sep	Oct	Nov	Dec	Year
Record high °C (°F)	31.1 (88.0)	31.7 (89.1)	33.3 (91.9)	33.9 (93.0)	35.0 (95.0)	35.0 (95.0)	34.4 (93.9)	33.3 (91.9)	33.3 (91.9)	33.3 (91.9)	32.8 (91.0)	31.7 (89.1)	35.0 (95.0)
Mean daily maximum °C (°F)	29.2 (84.6)	29.9 (85.8)	30.9 (87.6)	31.9 (89.4)	32.4 (90.3)	32.1 (89.8)	31.7 (89.1)	31.7 (89.1)	31.6 (88.9)	30.9 (87.6)	29.7 (85.5)	29.2 (84.6)	30.9 (87.7)
Daily mean °C (°F)	26.8 (80.2)	27.2 (81.0)	27.8 (82.0)	28.5 (83.3)	28.9 (84.0)	28.6 (83.5)	28.2 (82.8)	28.2 (82.8)	27.9 (82.2)	27.6 (81.7)	27.1 (80.8)	26.9 (80.4)	27.8 (82.1)
Mean daily minimum °C (°F)	24.4 (75.9)	24.4 (75.9)	24.6 (76.3)	25.2 (77.4)	25.4 (77.7)	25.1 (77.2)	24.7 (76.5)	24.6 (76.3)	24.4 (75.9)	24.4 (75.9)	24.6 (76.3)	24.7 (76.5)	24.7 (76.5)
Record low °C (°F)	17.2 (63.0)	18.3 (64.9)	18.9 (66.0)	20.0 (68.0)	20.0 (68.0)	20.6 (69.1)	20.0 (68.0)	20.0 (68.0)	20.0 (68.0)	20.6 (69.1)	21.1 (70.0)	19.4 (66.9)	17.2 (63.0)
Average precipitation mm (inches)	295 (11.6)	163 (6.4)	160 (6.3)	155 (6.1)	135 (5.3)	109 (4.3)	117 (4.6)	150 (5.9)	191 (7.5)	279 (11.0)	610 (24.0)	554 (21.8)	2,918 (114.9)
Average precipitation days (≥ 0.1 mm)	19	13	12	10	12	10	12	12	17	20	22	23	182
Average relative humidity (%)	76	71	70	69	68	68	70	69	69	73	78	79	72
Mean monthly sunshine hours	180	203	260	246	226	192	217	211	201	180	144	152	2,412
Source 1: IEMSistema de Clasificación Bioclimática Mundial (precipitation 1965–1980)
Source 2: Danish Meteorological Institute (precipitation days, humidity and sun 1931–1960)

Climate data for Kuala Terengganu
Month	Jan	Feb	Mar	Apr	May	Jun	Jul	Aug	Sep	Oct	Nov	Dec	Year
Mean daily daylight hours	11.9	12.0	12.1	12.2	12.4	12.4	12.4	12.3	12.2	12.0	11.9	11.8	12.1
Average Ultraviolet index	6	7	7	7	7	7	7	7	7	7	6	6	7
Source: Weather Atlas

== Demographics ==
=== Ethnicity and religion ===
Ethnic groups in Kuala Terengganu – 2020 Census
Ethnic	Percent
Bumiputera	97.1%
Chinese	2.4%
Indians	0.3%
Others	0.1%
Population by percentage This excludes non-citizens which form 1.7% of Kuala Terengganu's population

In the 19th century, Thomas John Newbold, an English soldier working for the East India Company, estimated the population of Kuala Terengganu to be around 15,000 to 20,000 Malays with 600 Chinese, but this was presumably an overestimation. There were few brick buildings in the town. The principal brick buildings were a mosque and a custom house. Most of the houses were made of wood and thatch. The Chinese settlement in Kuala Terengganu, Kampung Cina, had become an old and established settlement. Most of the houses and shops in Kampung Cina were made of stone and brick. There were also a considerable number of Arabs and their descendants in Kuala Terengganu.

According to The Malaysian Census 2010, Kuala Terengganu has a population of 406,317. The city population mainly consists of Malays with a population of 319,813. Chinese residents are the second biggest ethnic group (11,617). Other residents include non-Malaysian citizens (4,326), other Bumiputras (643), Indians (867) and others (287). The same census shows that the population of Kuala Terengganu by religion is 96.9% Muslim, 2.5% Buddhist, 0.2% Hindu, 0.2% Christian, and 0.2% follower of other religions, Sikhs, or non-religious. All Malays are Muslim. The Chinese of Kuala Terengganu are made up of Hokkien speakers and they practise Buddhism, Taoism, Islam or Christianity. A small number of Hindus and Sikhs also exist. By 2020, the total population for the entire area under Kuala Terengganu City Council jurisdiction had risen to around 375,424 people. In 2026, the total population for the city rose to 410,500 people.

=== Languages ===
Terengganu Malay is the most widely spoken and main lingua franca in the city and is spoken by the Malays in Kuala Terengganu. Some Malays also speak Kelantanese, especially those who came from Besut, northern Setiu and Kelantan. The Chinese mostly use Hokkien with some using Teochew and Mandarin. Most Indians in Kuala Terengganu speak Tamil. Standard Malay and English are widely spoken and understood.

== Economy ==
Kuala Terengganu was a major fishing port and one of the important trading ports in Malaya. The chief export commodities were coffee, gambier, gold, ivory, pepper and tin. They were mainly traded for rice, tobacco, cotton goods and opium.

The economic sector in Kuala Terengganu is mostly made up of small-scale manufacturing industries such as the traditional textile making, local food industries, arts and craft factories, and agriculture, with most of them centred around residential areas or villages. There are two main industrial estates catered to bigger industries, one in Chendering and the other one in Gong Badak. Factories such as those that produce bricks or timber products are located further away from the main city areas. As the principal gateway for tourists to the state, tourism remains as one of economic source for Kuala Terengganu.

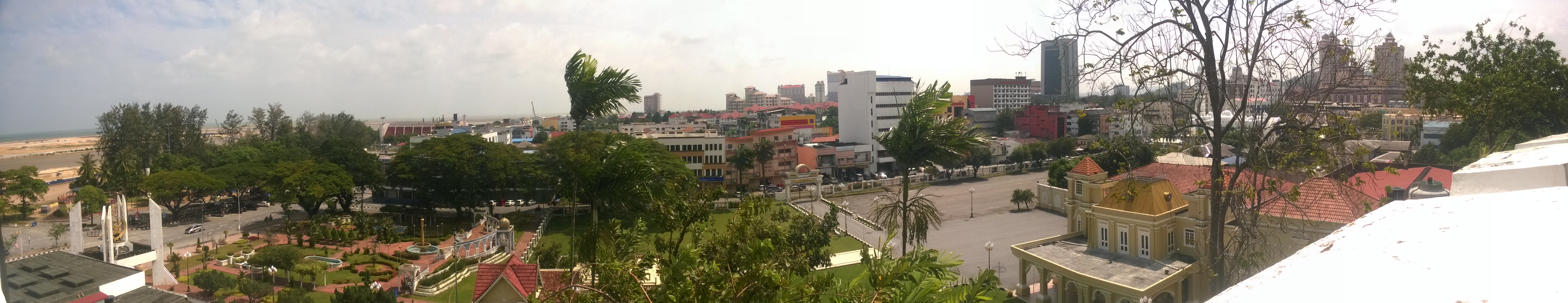
The view of Kuala Terengganu from the top of Bukit Puteri.

== Public facilities and infrastructure ==
=== Transportation ===
==== Public transport ====
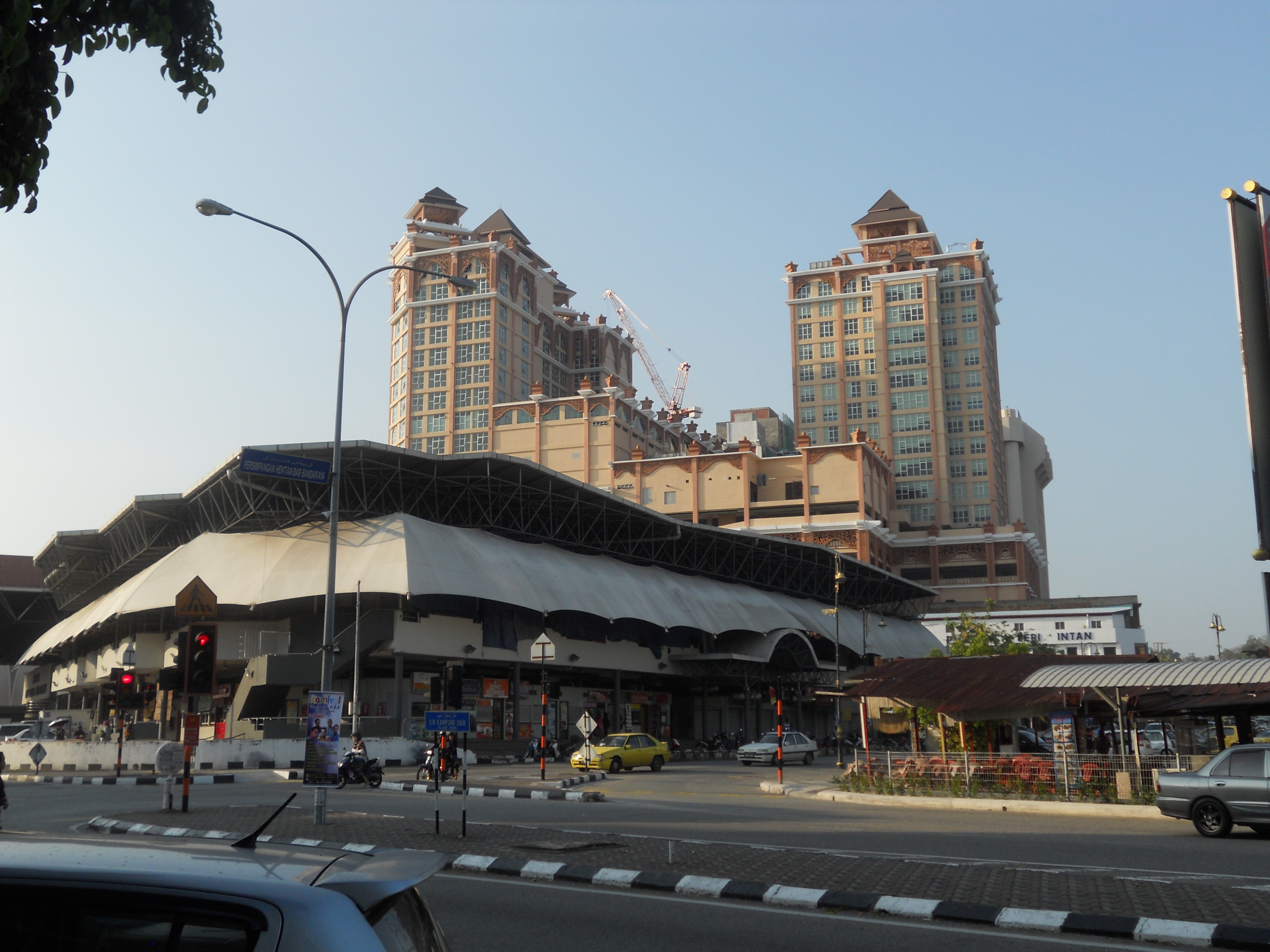
Kuala Terengganu Bus Terminal

Transport facilities that are available in Kuala Terengganu include the taxicab and Kuala Terengganu Bus Terminal where the local bus services and interstate coaches to all major cities and towns in Peninsular Malaysia and Singapore operate. There is a limited service tourist bus that plies back and forth to tourist areas such as the Nor Arfa batik outlet south of the city, and the jetty for ferries to the island resorts at Redang and Perhentian islands. Kuala Terengganu has its own special bus service known as Bas Bandar or Town Bus, operated by the state-owned firm Cas Ligas Sdn. Bhd. The buses have the characteristics of a traditional old Malay house through the unique roof design to reflect the state cultural identity. The buses cover three lines in and out of the city. A token fare of MYR1 should be paid for each ride.

The BAS.MY initiative in Kuala Terengganu, launched under the *Stage Bus Service Transformation (SBST)* program since February 2025, provides reliable and affordable public transportation for residents. Operated by the Land Public Transport Agency (APAD) and funded by the Malaysian Ministry of Transport, the service covers key routes such as T100 (City Feeder), T20 (Kuala Terengganu to Bukit Payung), and T30 (Kuala Terengganu to Marang Terminal), with buses departing hourly from 6:00 AM to 7:30 PM daily. The service features a vibrant pink livery and offers fare exemptions for students (aged 7–17), seniors (60+), and persons with disabilities, alongside a flat monthly pass of RM50 for unlimited rides.

Code	Route
T10	Kuala Terengganu - Merang Jety
T11	Kuala Terengganu - Batu Rakit
T20	Kuala Terengganu - Bukit Payung via Pasir Panjang
T21	Kuala Terengganu - Bukit Payung via Sungai Rengas
T22	Kuala Terengganu - Kuala Berang
T30	Kuala Terengganu - Marang via Chendering
T31	Kuala Terengganu - Marang via Kedai Buloh
T100	Kuala Terengganu City Feeder

There are also trishaw services although this service is dying fast and is not as extensive as the ones in the states of Malacca and Penang. In Kuala Terengganu, pedestrian-pulled rickshaws were gradually replaced by trishaws (beca in Malay). Trishaws were ubiquitous up to the 1970s in cities. Since then, rapid urbanisation has increased demand for more efficient public transport, resulting in dwindling trishaw numbers. Today, trishaws are operated mostly as a tourist attraction in Kuala Terengganu. The city's only taxi rank stands nearby to the city's bus terminal.

As with the rest of Terengganu, Keretapi Tanah Melayu (KTM) does not serve Kuala Terengganu. Nevertheless, this is about to change as the East Coast Rail Link (ECRL) project, has commenced and is slated to connect Kuala Terengganu with Tumpat and Kota Bharu in Kelantan, Kuantan in Pahang, and Gombak in Kuala Lumpur by 2026.

Kuala Terengganu is also the first city in the East Coast to have a public bicycle-sharing system. This service is provided the Singaporean operator, oBike. Like all other cities with oBike, the system has no docking stations. Instead the bikes have a built-in Bluetooth lock and can therefore be left anywhere at the end of a journey. Users use a smartphone app to locate and hire bikes.

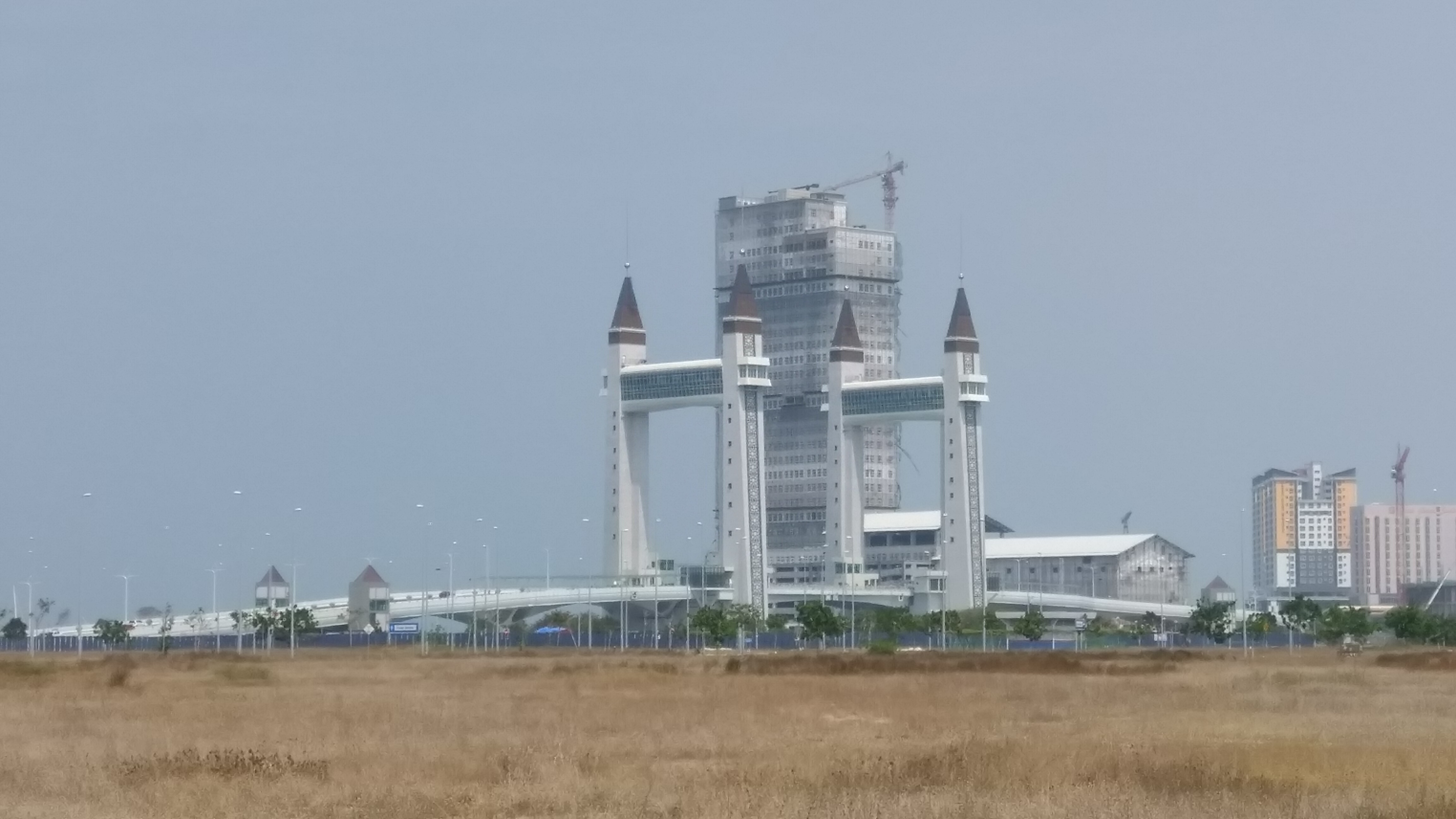
A view of Kuala Terengganu Drawbridge from Seberang Takir

==== Land ====
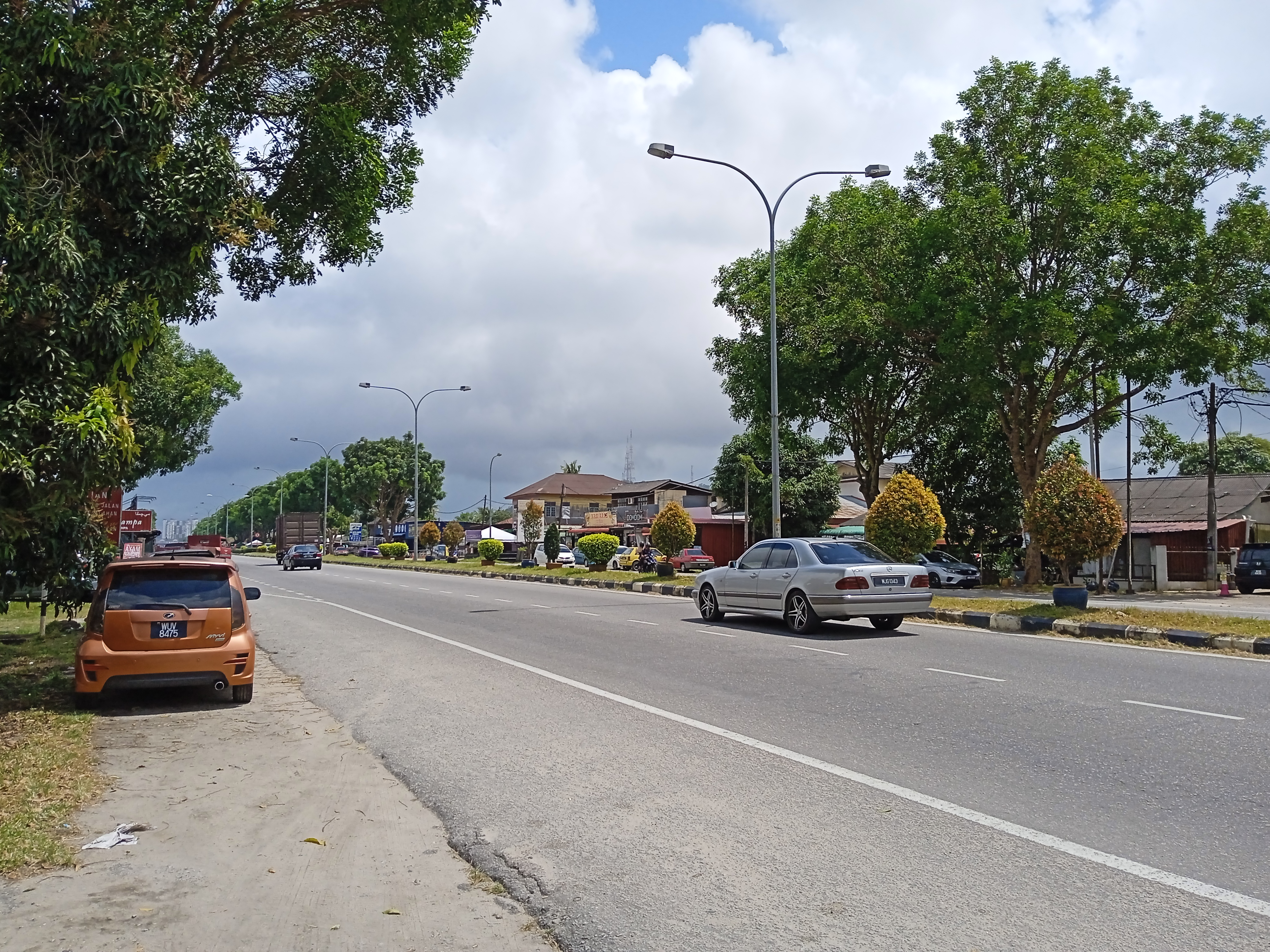
Jerangau Highway.

The Sultan Mahmud Bridge, a three-kilometre bridge over the Terengganu River, provides the main road link between the two banks of the river (connecting Kuala Nerus to Kuala Terengganu) and Duyong Island. Two other bridges that straddles the river to connect both sides of the city are Manir Bridge and Pulau Sekati Bridge. A new fourth bridge, Kuala Terengganu Drawbridge, was completed in mid-2019 and fully opened for traffic in August. The bascule bridge, which is the first of its kind in Malaysia, spans 638 metres and has four 15-storey towers with skybridges. It connects the city centre with Seberang Takir via Muara Utara, a reclaimed land slated for future developments. The city and suburbs are relatively easy to negotiate by car. Kuala Terengganu is connected to other towns via a good network of roads that are accessible from many major towns and cities in Peninsula Malaysia. The East Coast Expressway (LPT) E8, which starts from Gombak until Kuala Terengganu, has shorten the time for travellers to drive from the West Coast of Peninsular Malaysia. It takes four hours to drive from Kuala Lumpur to reach the city via the LPT. Visitors can also drive to Kuala Terengganu by using the Federal Route 3 from Kuantan (besides using the LPT), Kota Bharu, and Johor Bahru that offers a more scenic view of the coastline and villages. From the north of the peninsula, Kuala Terengganu is reachable via East-West Highway 4 and Second East–West Highway 185.

==== Air ====
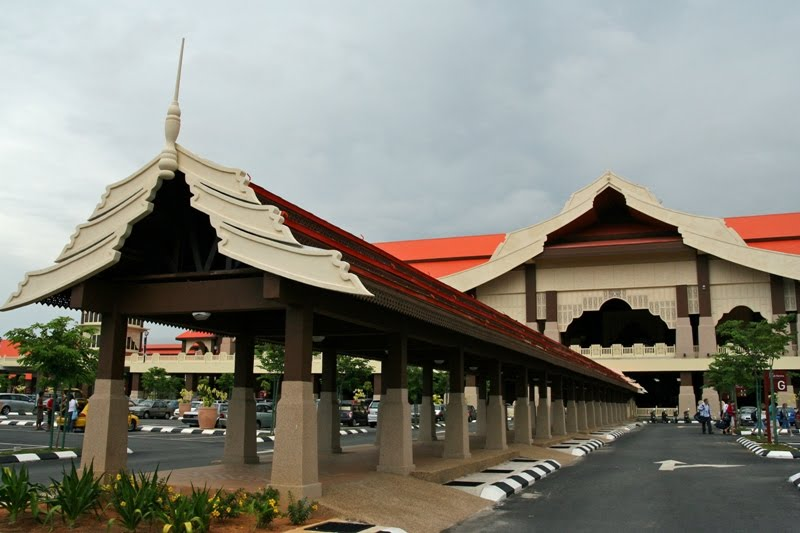
Sultan Mahmud Airport incorporates traditional Terengganu designs for its terminal building.

The nearest airport which serve the city is the Sultan Mahmud Airport (IATA: TGG, ICAO: WMKN) serving domestic and international routes located in the neighbouring Kuala Nerus District. The airlines serving this airport are Malaysia Airlines, Firefly, AirAsia, and Malindo Air. Until December 2014, the airport was connected by 5 cities which operated daily and weekly flights from/to Kuala Lumpur–International, Kuala Lumpur-Subang, Medan, Miri, and Singapore. Malaysia Airlines also brings passengers to Mecca via Jeddah and Medina during the hajj season. In 2013, the airport handled 699,310 passengers with 11,402 aircraft movements. The terminal was designed to handle 2 million passengers every year.

==== Water ====
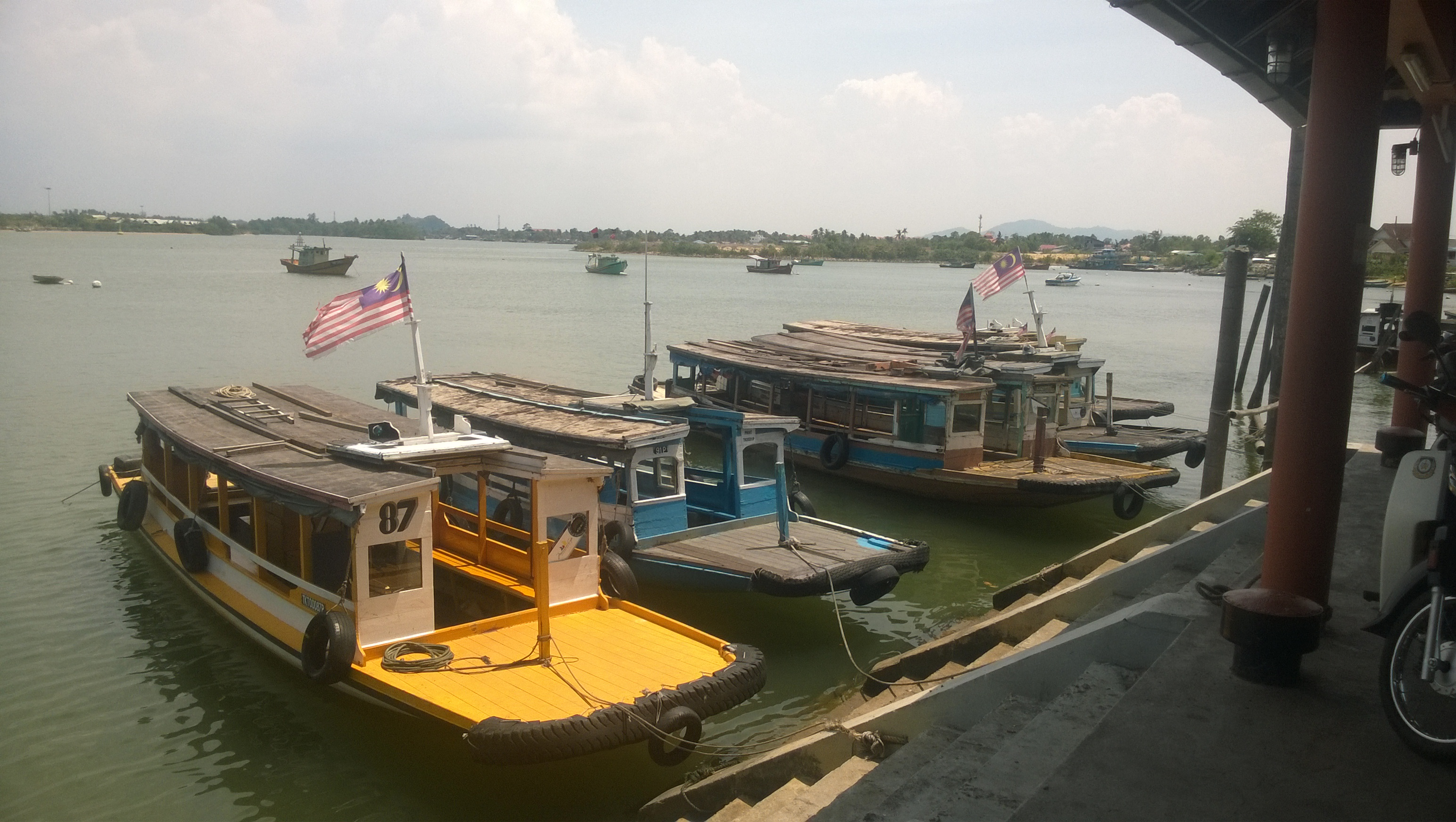
The traditional water taxis known locally as 'bot penambang' in Kuala Terengganu.

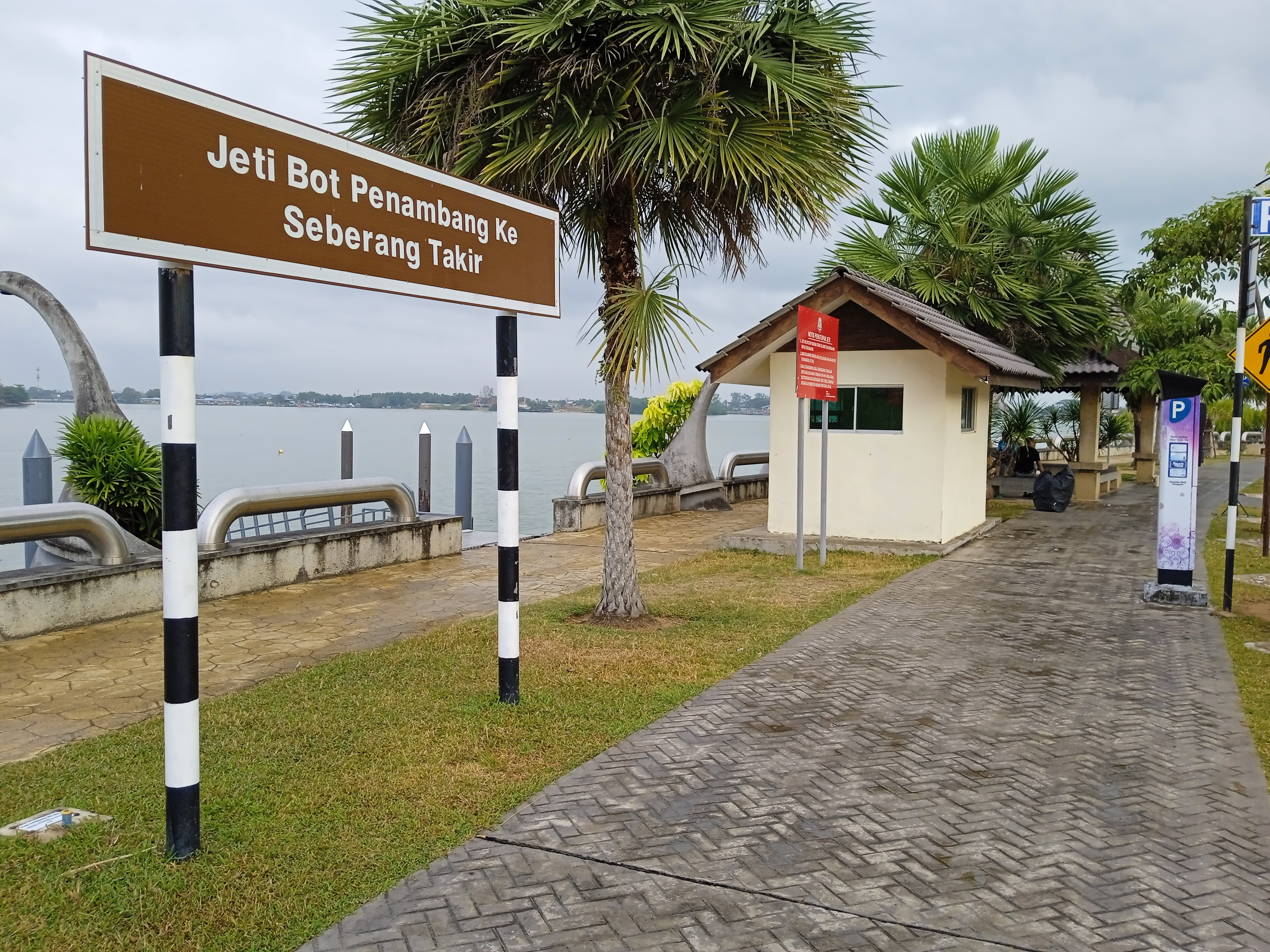
Bot penambang jetty in Kuala Terengganu

The city also has water transportation that ply the Terengganu River. The lifeline between the north and south parts of the city are the water taxis more popularly known as bot penambang. Bot penambang are engined, roofed wooden boats made to carry passengers from Seberang Takir Jetty and Pulau Duyong Kecil Jetty to Kuala Terengganu Jetty. It is the easiest and shortest way to get to the city. There are also ferry services to the resort island of Redang and other small islands, although these services are mainly carried out by modern express ferries. The ferries dock at Syahbandar Jetty, just in front of the General Post Office.

=== Courts of law and legal enforcement ===
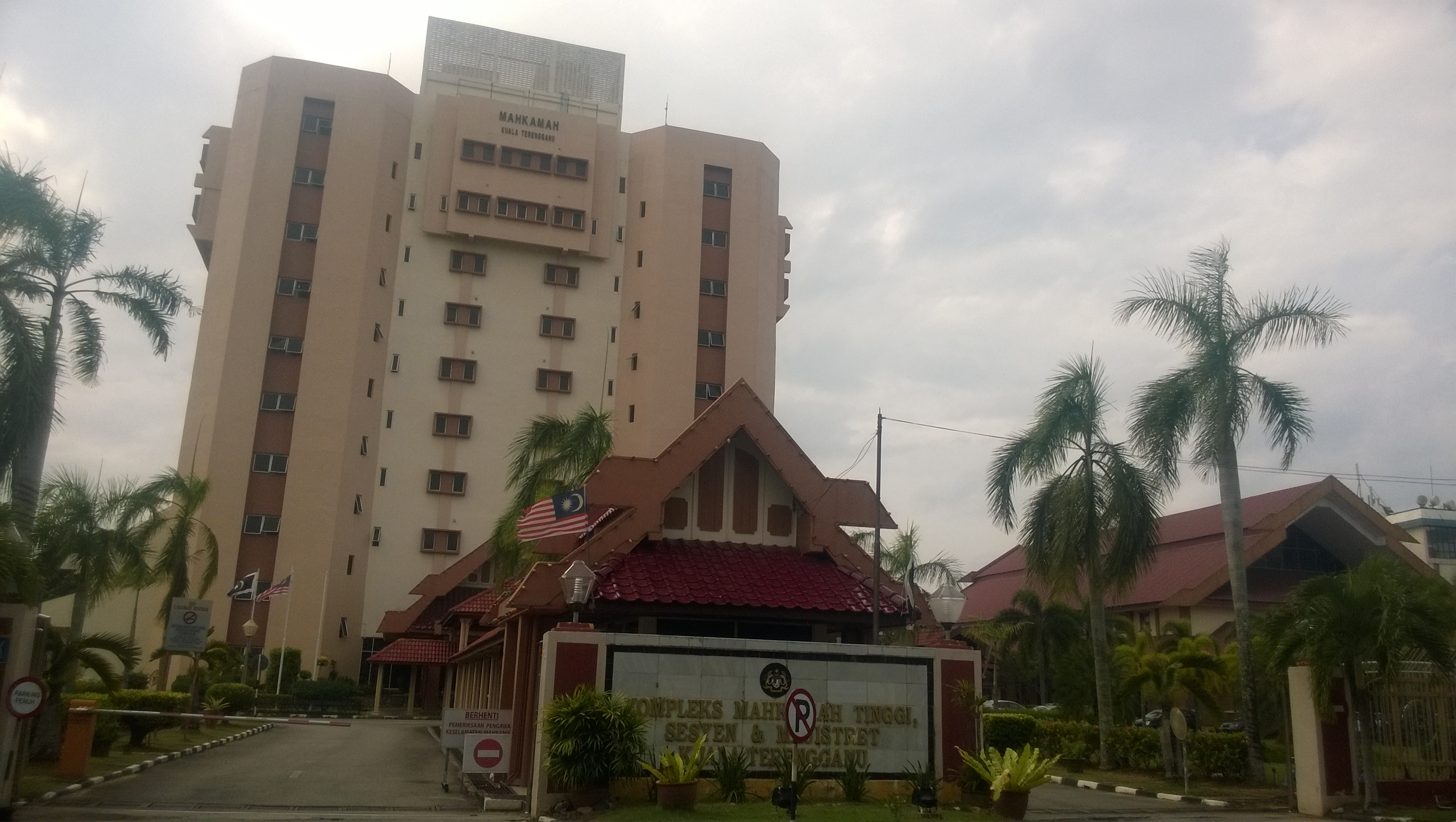
Kuala Terengganu Court Building, combining the High, Sessions, and Magistrate Courts under one roof.

All types of courts in Kuala Terengganu can be found in Jalan Sultan Mohamad. The High Court, Sessions Court, and the Magistrate Court are housed under one building complex. Another type of court, the Syariah Court is situated not far from the Terengganu Courts Complex. The headquarters of the Royal Malaysia Police's Terengganu Police Contingent and the Kuala Terengganu District Police Contingent are at Jalan Sultan Omar. Other small police stations are located in and around the two districts that make up the city. There is no prison complex in the district, but temporary lock-up cells are to be found in most police stations here. The main fire station is at Jalan Kemajuan, near Bukit Kecil. This is the biggest fire station in Kuala Terengganu. Another fire station is located just beside Pasar Payang in the city centre. The headquarters of the Malaysian Civil Defence Department, the civil defence services agency in Malaysia, is at Jalan Lapangan Terbang, near to Terengganu Sports Complex. The 18th Battalion of the Royal Malay Regiment of the Malaysian Army has its camp in the northern part of the district at Kem Sri Pantai in Seberang Takir, near to the airport and Teluk Ketapang Beach. The camp is currently undergoing restoration and upgrading processes.

=== Healthcare ===
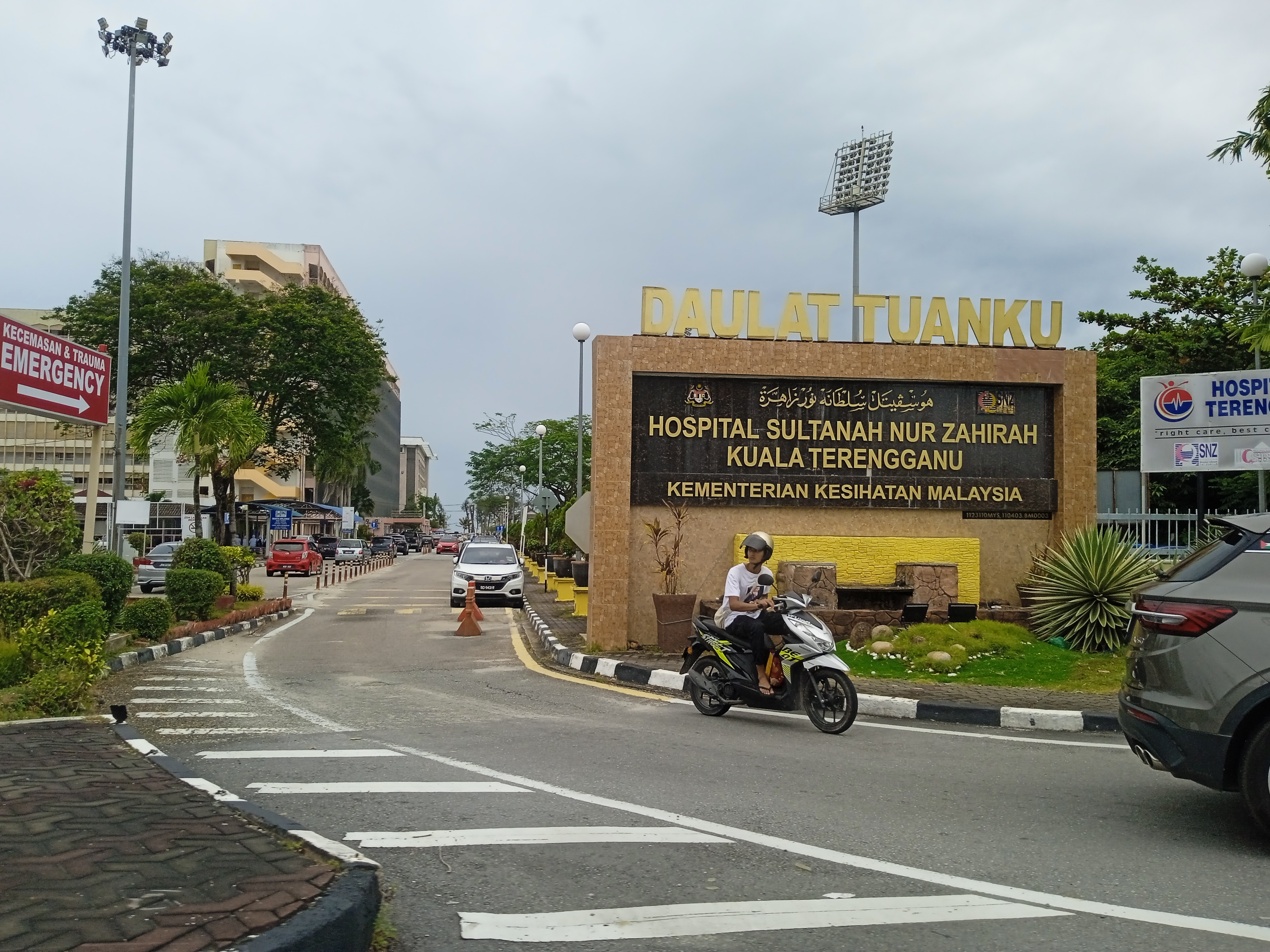
Sultanah Nur Zahirah Hospital

Unlike other major cities, Kuala Terengganu does not have a lot of hospitals. The main hospital is Sultanah Nur Zahirah Hospital (HSNZ), formerly known as Kuala Terengganu General Hospital, the largest hospital in the state with 821 beds. This is a public government hospital that began to provide its services during the 1920s. Kuala Terengganu Specialist Hospital is the first and largest private hospital in the state, operating since September 2006. Another private hospital that operates in the city is SALAM Specialist Hospital. There are other types of clinics such as private and public health clinics, village clinics, and 1Malaysia clinics operating in the district.

=== Religious institutions ===
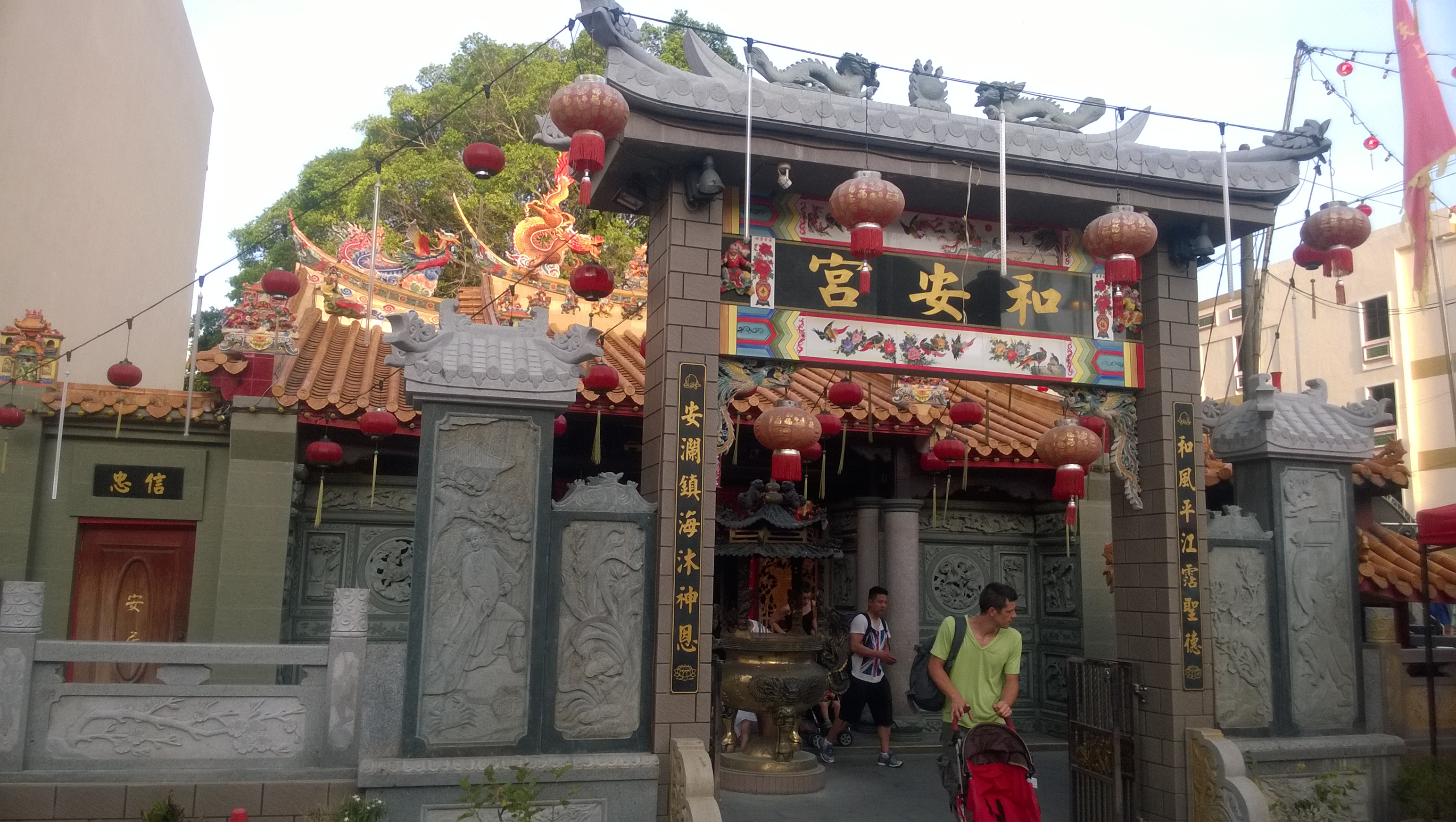
Ho Ann Kiong Temple in Kampung Cina.

There are no shortages of mosques or Muslim prayer buildings. The most famous among the religious buildings and considered as tourist attractions include Abidin Mosque (built during the reign of the late Sultan Zainal Abidin II between 1793 and 1808) and Tengku Tengah Zaharah Mosque, also known as the 'floating mosque' due to its structure that was built above water. Another old mosque in the city is the Hiliran Mosque, which was constructed in 1874.

There are two Chinese temples, Ho Ann Kiong Temple and Tian Hou Gong Temple nearby Chinatown. Two Presbyterian churches, the largest being Jalan Air Jerneh Presbyterian Church and another one in Chinatown, and an Anglican church known as St Andrew's Church can also be found in the city, while the main Catholic church is known as the Terengganu Catholic Mission parish. For Hindu adherents, there is temple that is known as Sri Kali Yuga Durga Lakshmi Aman Temple, located in Jalan Cherong Lanjut.

=== Education ===
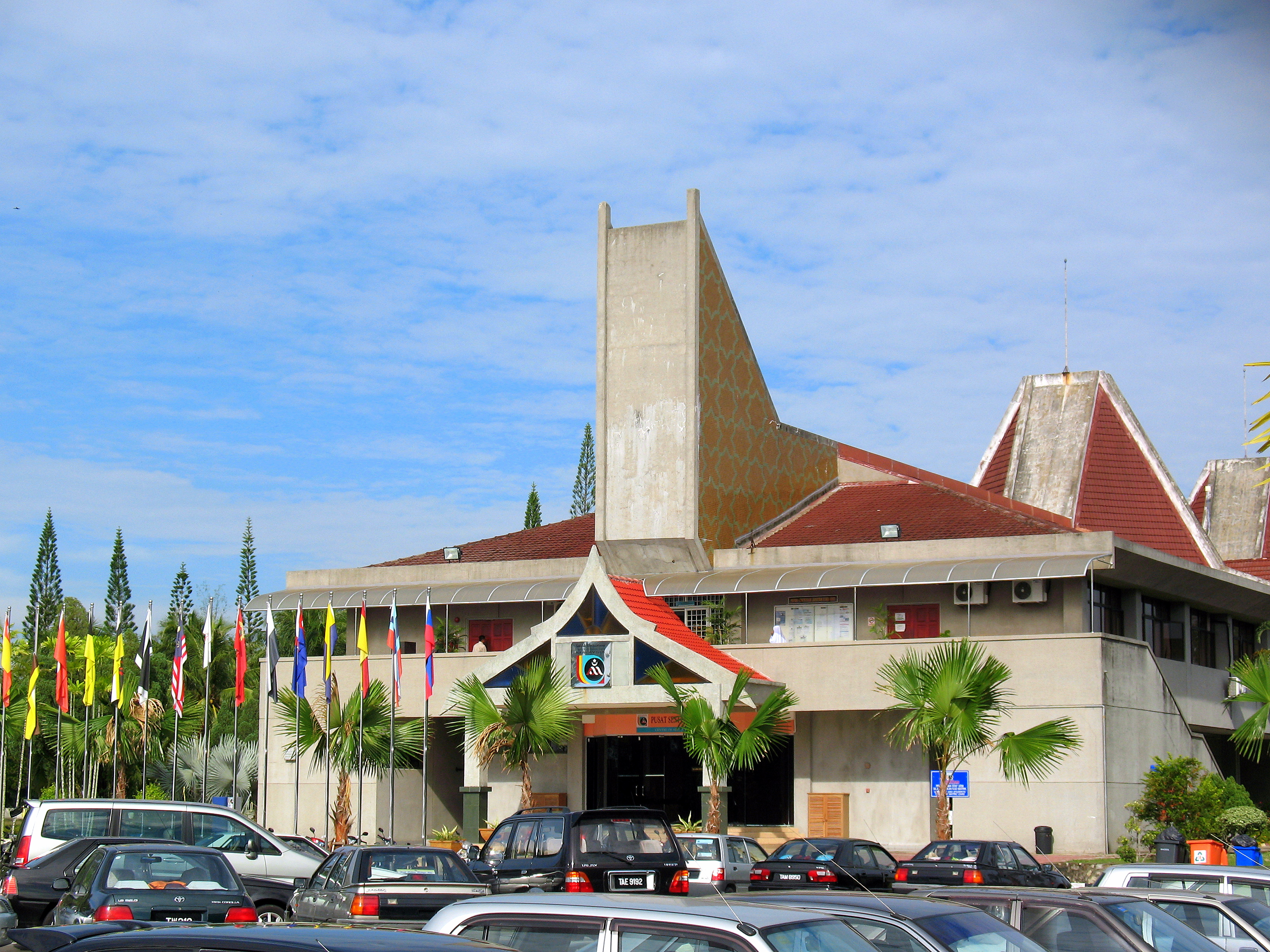
The administration building of Universiti Sultan Zainal Abidin in its Gong Badak Campus.

Kuala Terengganu is the centre of tertiary education in the state. There are three public universities here and they are Universiti Sultan Zainal Abidin (with two of its three campuses in Kuala Terengganu City Council area), Universiti Malaysia Terengganu (located in Kuala Nerus area of the city), and Universiti Teknologi MARA Chendering campus. Other tertiary education institutes include Insitut Teknologi Petronas, Kuala Terengganu Community College, Politeknik Kuala Terengganu, and others. There is one institute of teacher education in Kuala Terengganu, that is Institut Pendidikan Guru Kampus Dato' Razali Ismail.

Similar to other Malaysian schools, non-tertiary education in the city is divided into four levels: pre-school, primary, secondary (lower and upper) and post-secondary. There are 81 primary schools and 34 secondary schools in Kuala Terengganu. Among the examples of secondary schools are KOSPINT, SMJK Chung Hwa Wei Sin, Sekolah Berasrama Penuh Integrasi Batu Rakit, Sekolah Menengah Imtiaz Kuala Nerus, SMKA Sheikh Abdul Malek, SMKA Dato Haji Abbas, Sekolah Menengah Sains Sultan Mahmud, and SMK Sultan Sulaiman.

==== Libraries ====
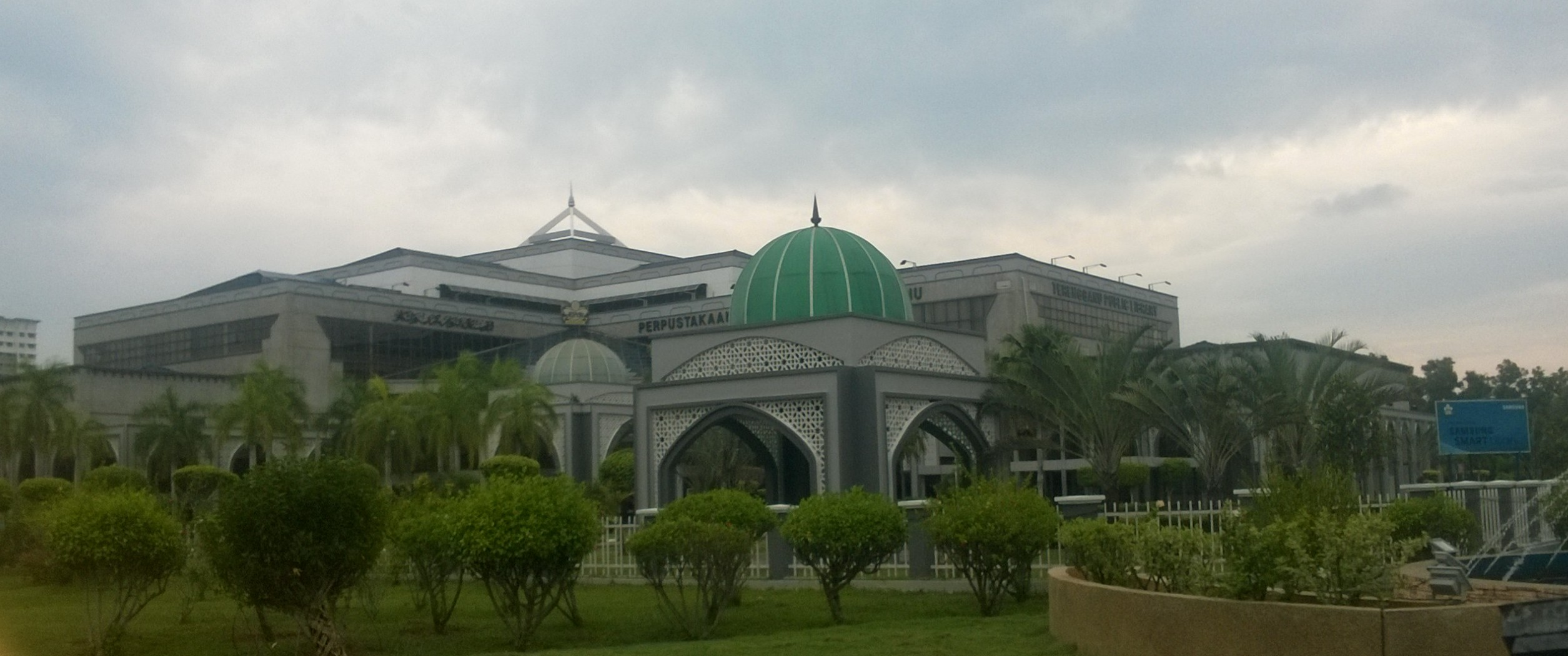
Terengganu State Library.

The Terengganu State Library is located at Jalan Kemajuan, near the southern end of Sultan Mahmud Bridge, and is the largest library of the state. As a major public library of Terengganu, it is the main information resource centre and provides information services for the users from all sectors and ages. Other libraries or private libraries can be found in schools, colleges, or universities. Other than the state library, smaller village libraries are also available in Seberang Takir, Mengabang Telipot, Tepuh, and Atas Tol.

== Tourism and culture ==
=== Attractions and recreation spots ===
==== Historical ====
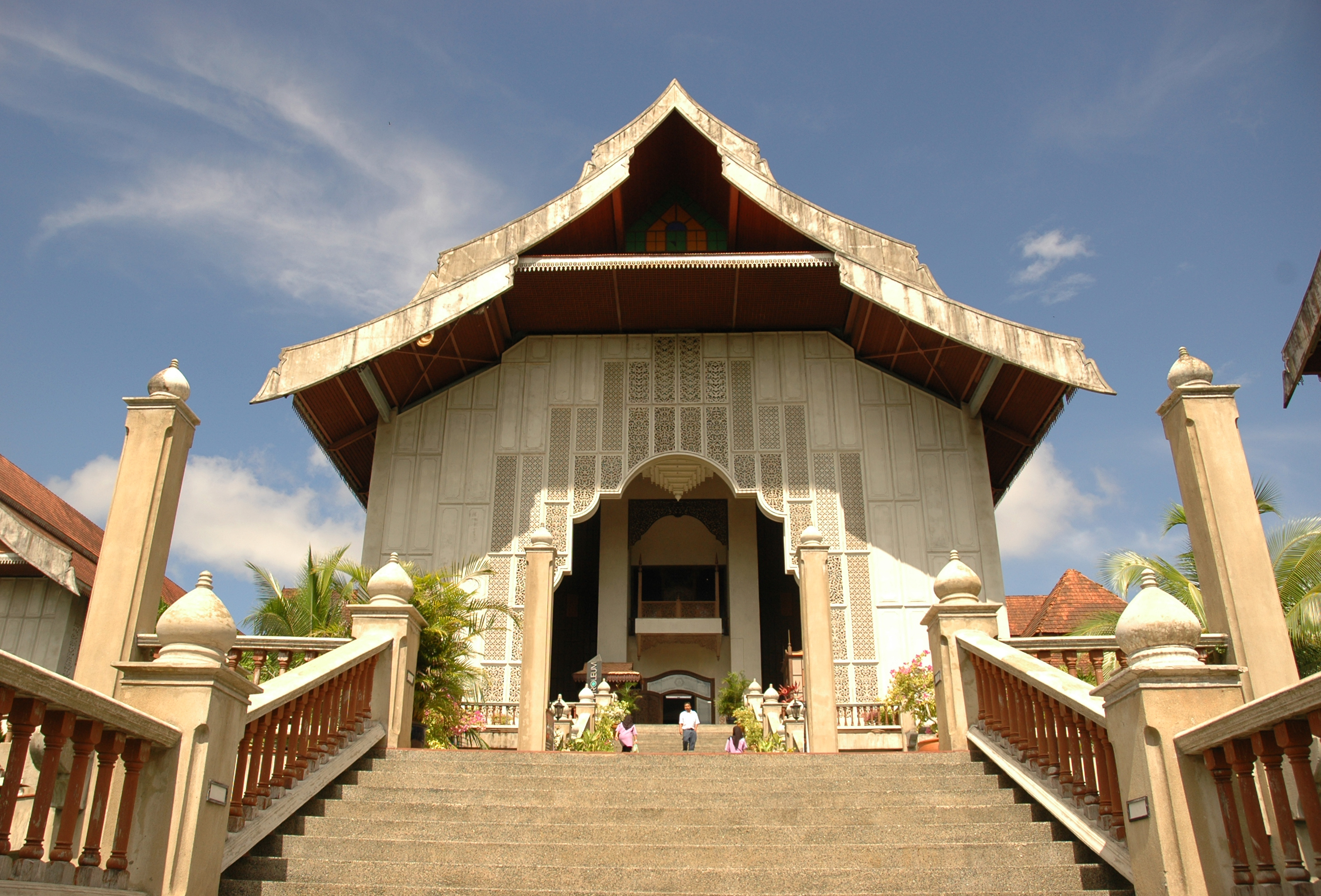
The façade of the main building of the Terengganu State Museum.

The Terengganu State Museum is located in Kampung Losong. It is acclaimed to be one of the largest museum complexes in Malaysia and South East Asia with an area of 27 hectares. The architecture is based on the traditional Terengganu Malay house known as rumah tele. It has eight different galleries and other open air exhibits such as Petronas Gallery, Maritime Gallery, Islam Gallery, exhibits of traditional Terengganuese houses, and many others. The museum is also the home of the Terengganu Inscription Stone, the oldest artefact with Jawi writing in this country.

Near the museum is the Islamic Heritage Park (Malay: Taman Tamadun Islam). This park is an educational entertainment park that showcases various replicas of famous mosque from all over the world. Among the replicas are Al-Masjid al-Haram, Qol Sharif Mosque, and Masjid Negara. The Crystal Mosque is also located here. Boat cruise services along Terengganu River are also provided for the visitors.

A small hill known as Bukit Puteri can be found nearby to Pasar Payang. The hill is located near the banks of Terengganu River and because of its strategic location, it was used as a fortification by the sultans of the state. Old artefacts, a graveyard, and monuments can be found on top of the hill. During the Islamic holy month of Ramadan, a century-old brass bell known as genta will be rung to signify that it is time for iftar, or the end of the fasting on that day.

==== Cultural ====
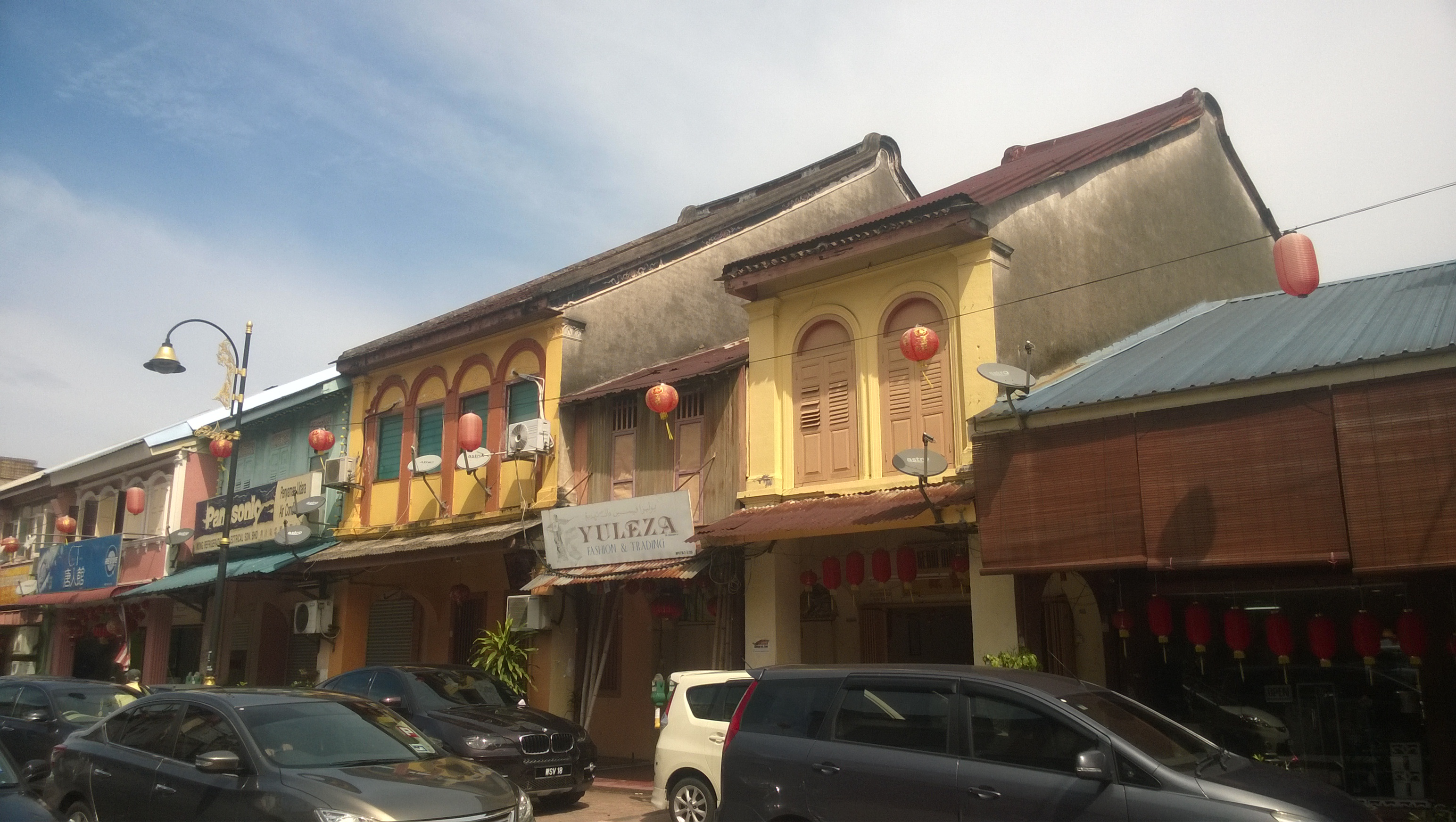
The shophouses of Chinatown.

The Chinatown of Kuala Terengganu (Malay: Kampung Cina, Simplified Chinese: 唐人坡, local pronunciation: Teng-lang-po) is the centre of the Peranakan Chinese in the city. One of the main tourist attractions of Kuala Terengganu, this settlement consists of two rows of shophouses from the prewar era, with some of them dating back from the 1700s. Most of the houses are 2 stories high, mainly made of bricks or concrete, with wooden flooring for the second storey. Some have kept the intricate wood carving windows, huge heavy wooden front doors, and olden plaques. The centuries-old buildings now consists of sundry shops, local coffee shops, offices, souvenir shops, restaurants, kopitiam, and other services. It is home to two Chinese temples, Ho Ann Kiong and Tien Hou Kong, which was built in 1801 and 1896. Another landmark is the 19th-century Low Tiey water well, erected in 1875. After years and years, it still supplies clean water to Chinatown's residents. Many of the buildings here have undergone restoration or beautification programmes to make them more appealing, but without destroying the heritage value. The recent attractions in Kampung China are its back alleys, many of which are transformed into thematic lanes containing various information, decorations and murals.

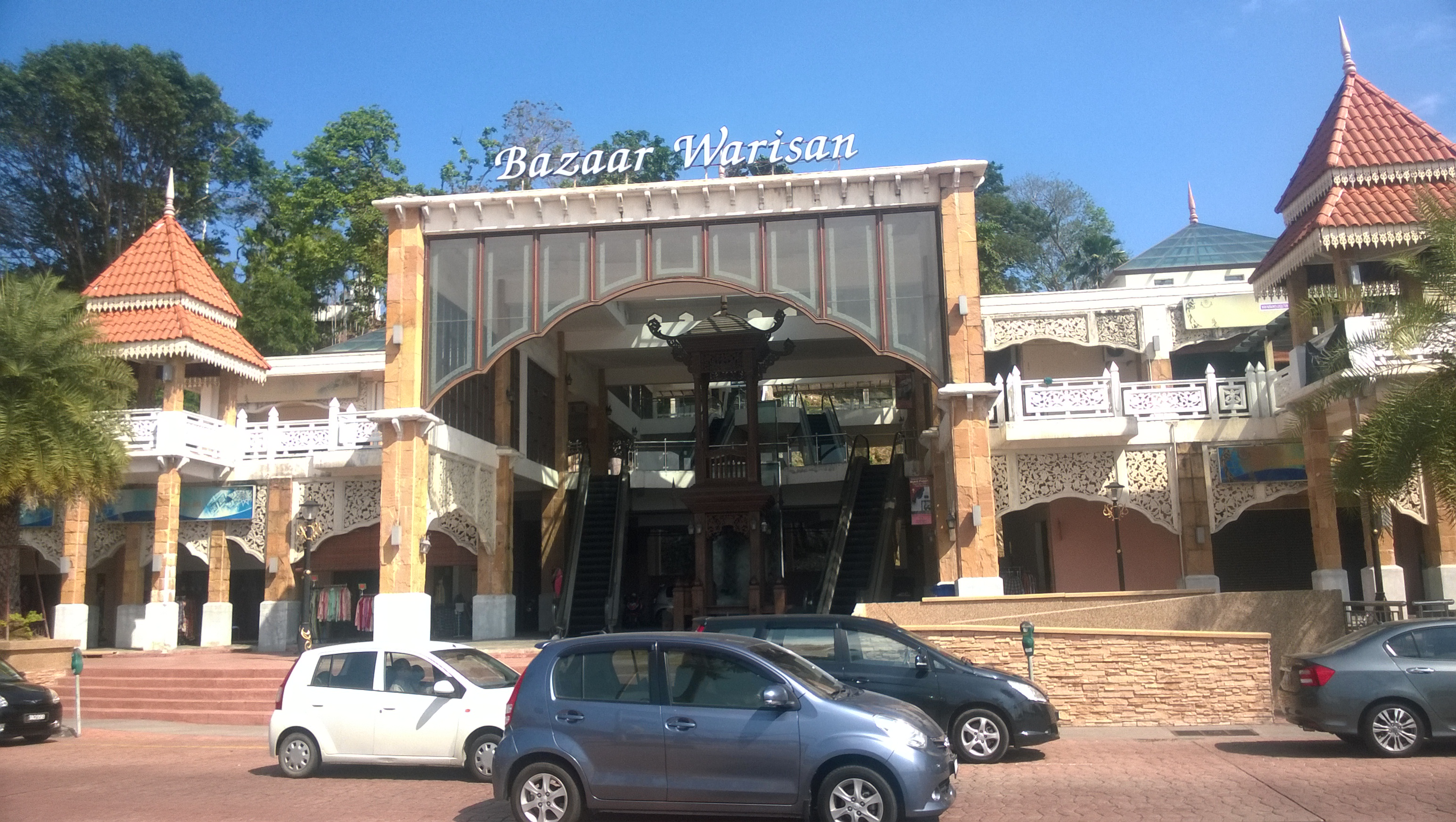
Bazaar Warisan contains vendors selling traditional fabrics such as batik and songket

Pasar Besar Kedai Payang or Central Market (more commonly known as Pasar Payang) is the main market of the city. This double-storey building houses different kinds of goods, ranging from fresh produce, poultry, sea products, traditional delicacies, home products, clothes, and handicrafts such as batik, songket, and brass ware. Pulau Duyong is a river island located at the Terengganu River estuary. It is popularly known for its traditional boat making activities. Pulau Duyong also contains a historical monument known as Kota Lama Duyong (Duyong Old Fort). It is a traditional Malay house built with local and European elements. Rumah Warisan Haji Su (Haji Su Heritage House), a complex of two traditional Malay houses located in mukim Losong, is another historical and cultural attraction of the city.

==== Leisure ====
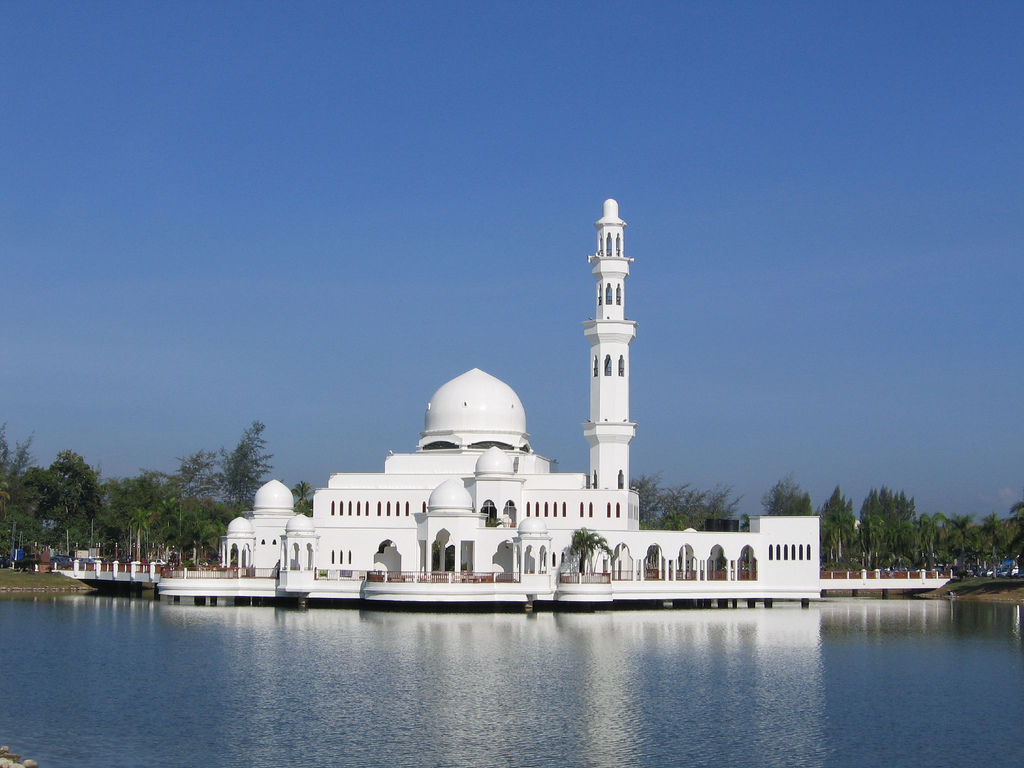
The Floating Mosque.

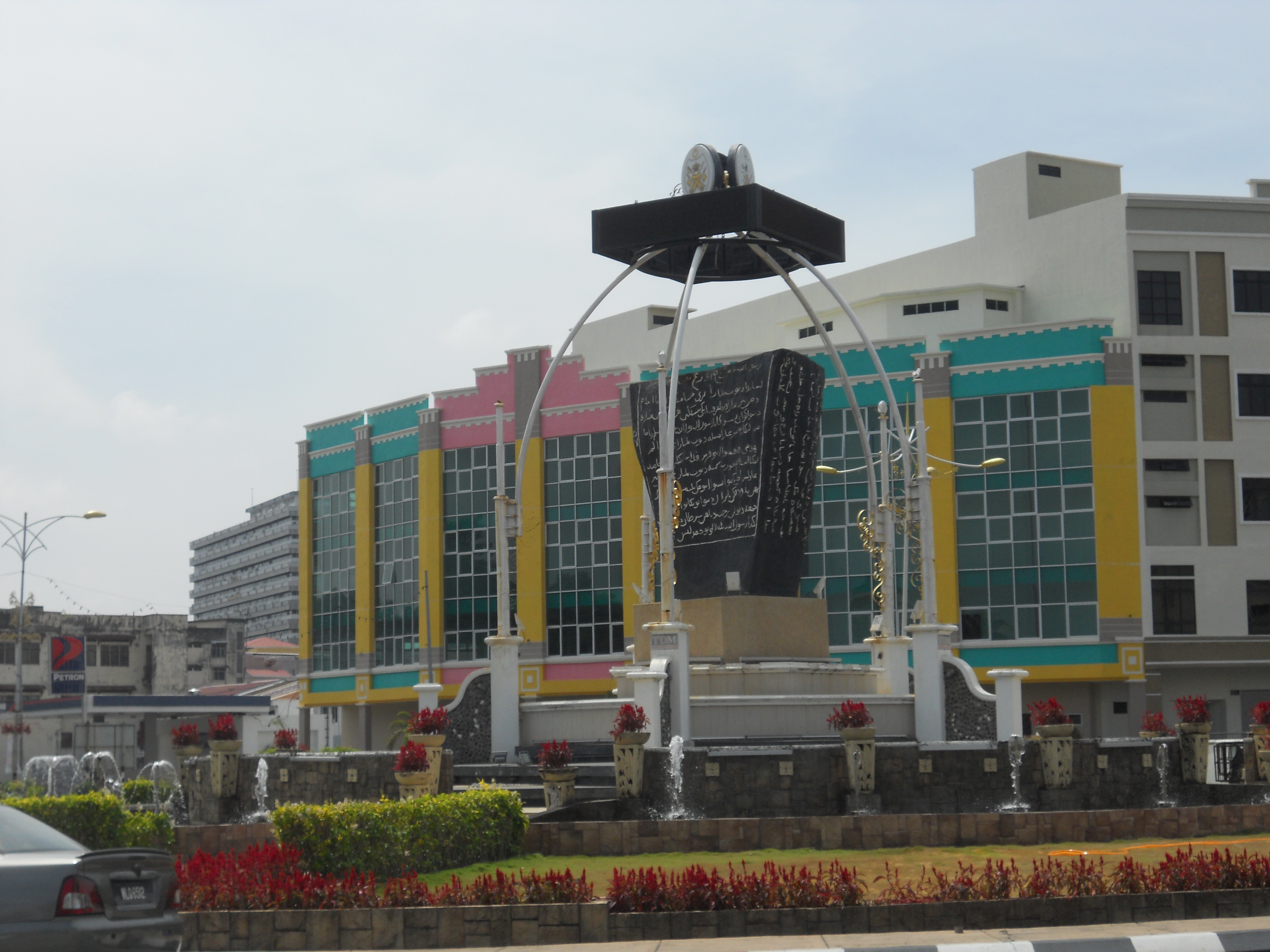
Terengganu Inscription Stone replica.

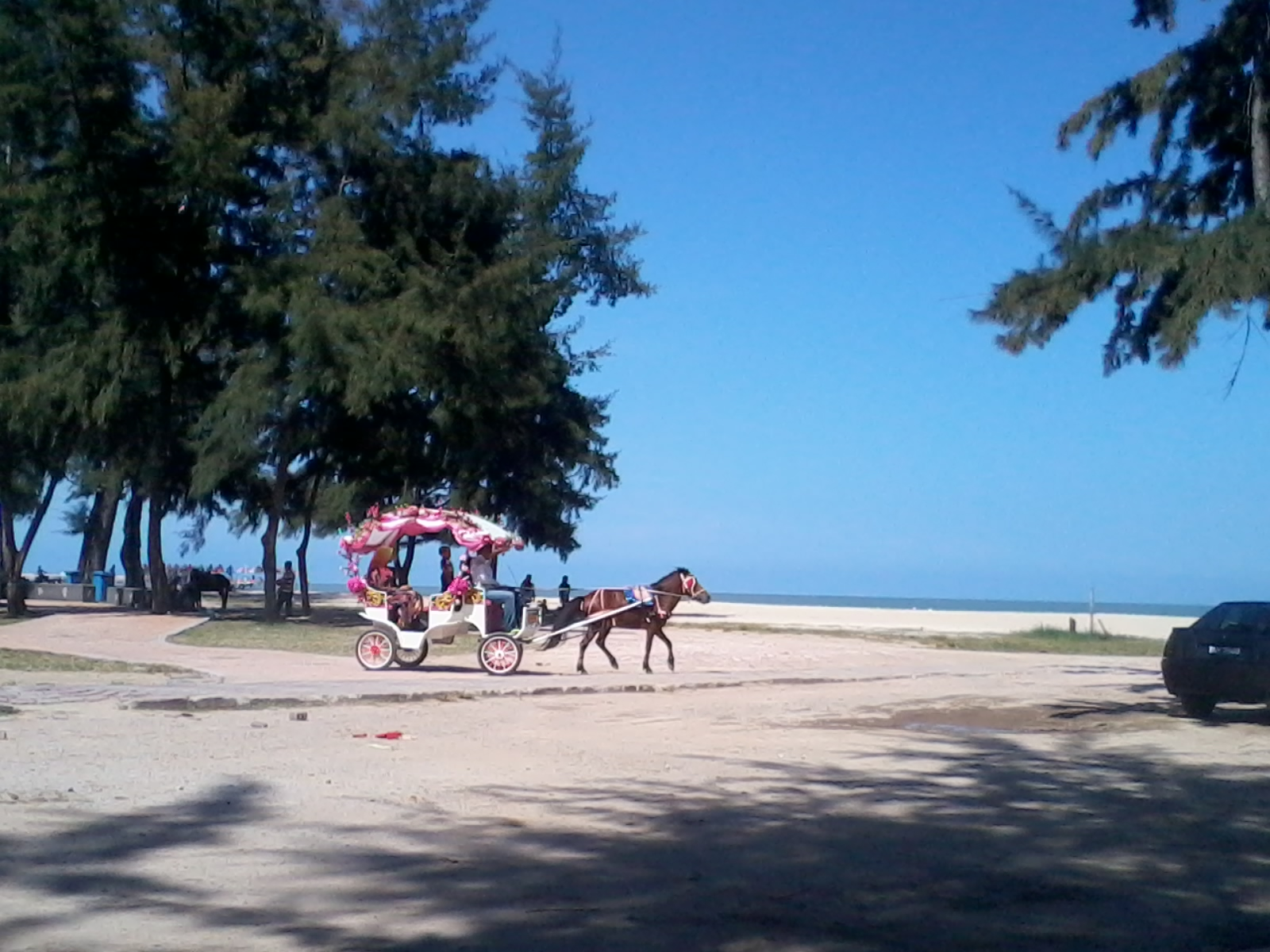
Batu Buruk Beach.

Kuala Terengganu has various places for recreation. Among the most prominent one is Batu Buruk Beach, located not far from the city centre. The beach has many amenities and facilities for the visitors. They can go for many activities at the beach such as horse riding, horse carriage rides and kite flying. However, visitors are not recommended to swim in the waters there because of strong waves. Taman Shahbandar is another recreation place in Kuala Terengganu, located by the Terengganu River estuary. This park is close to other attractions in Kuala Terengganu such as Pasar Payang, Bukit Puteri and Istana Maziah. Other recreational places in Kuala Terengganu are:

- Kuala Terengganu Waterfront, located south of Pulau Warisan by the Terengganu River. It offers a view of Pulau Duyong and Sultan Mahmud Bridge.
- Taman Awam Lagun Kuala Ibai, a park 4 kilometres away from the city centre, in which the Tengku Tengah Zaharah Mosque is located.
- Taman Awam Pantai Teluk Ketapang, a recreational beach and public park located in Kuala Nerus near Sultan Mahmud Airport.

==== Other sights ====
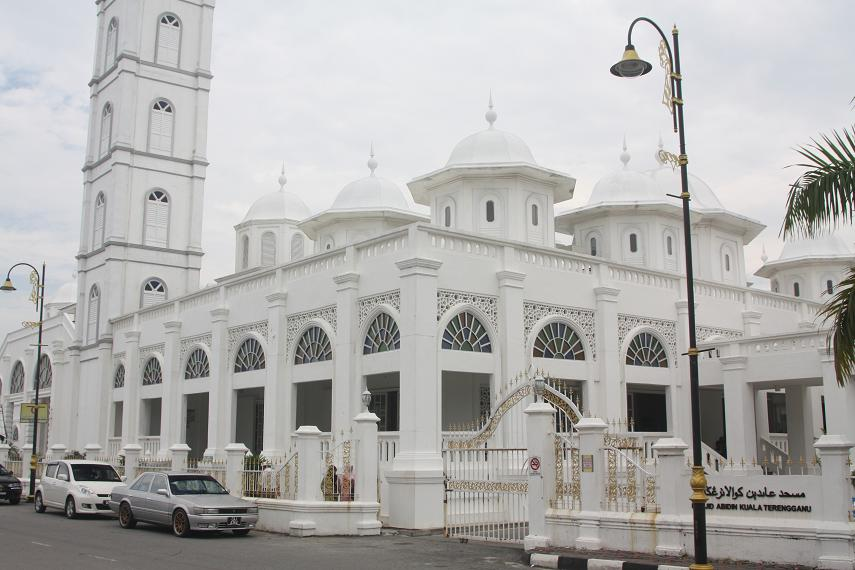
Abidin Mosque

The Abidin Mosque is Kuala Terengganu's old state royal mosque built by Sultan Zainal Abidin II between 1793 and 1808. It is popularly known as Masjid Putih (White Mosque). The mosque is also the location of the Royal Mausoleum. Seberang Takir is a fishing village situated on the northern bank of Terengganu River estuary and can be easily reached by using the bot penambang from Kuala Terengganu jetty. Here, visitors can see for themselves many cottage industries such as the producing of keropok lekor (a local fish cracker), batik printing, and drying salted fish, and the making of belacan (shrimp paste).

A giant replica of the Terengganu Inscription Stone is mounted on a roundabout on Jalan Sultan Ismail.

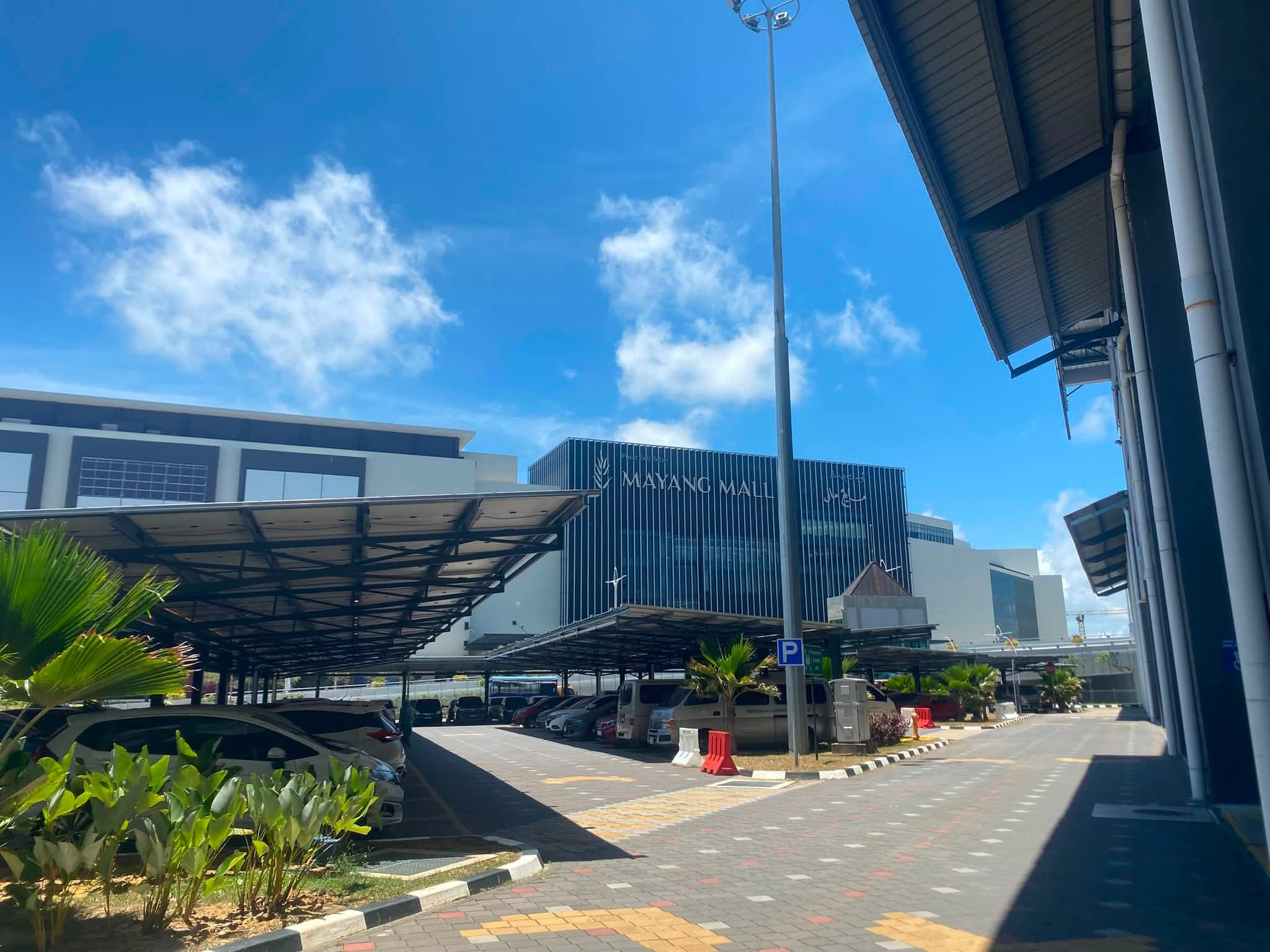
Mayang Mall is the largest mall in Terengganu.

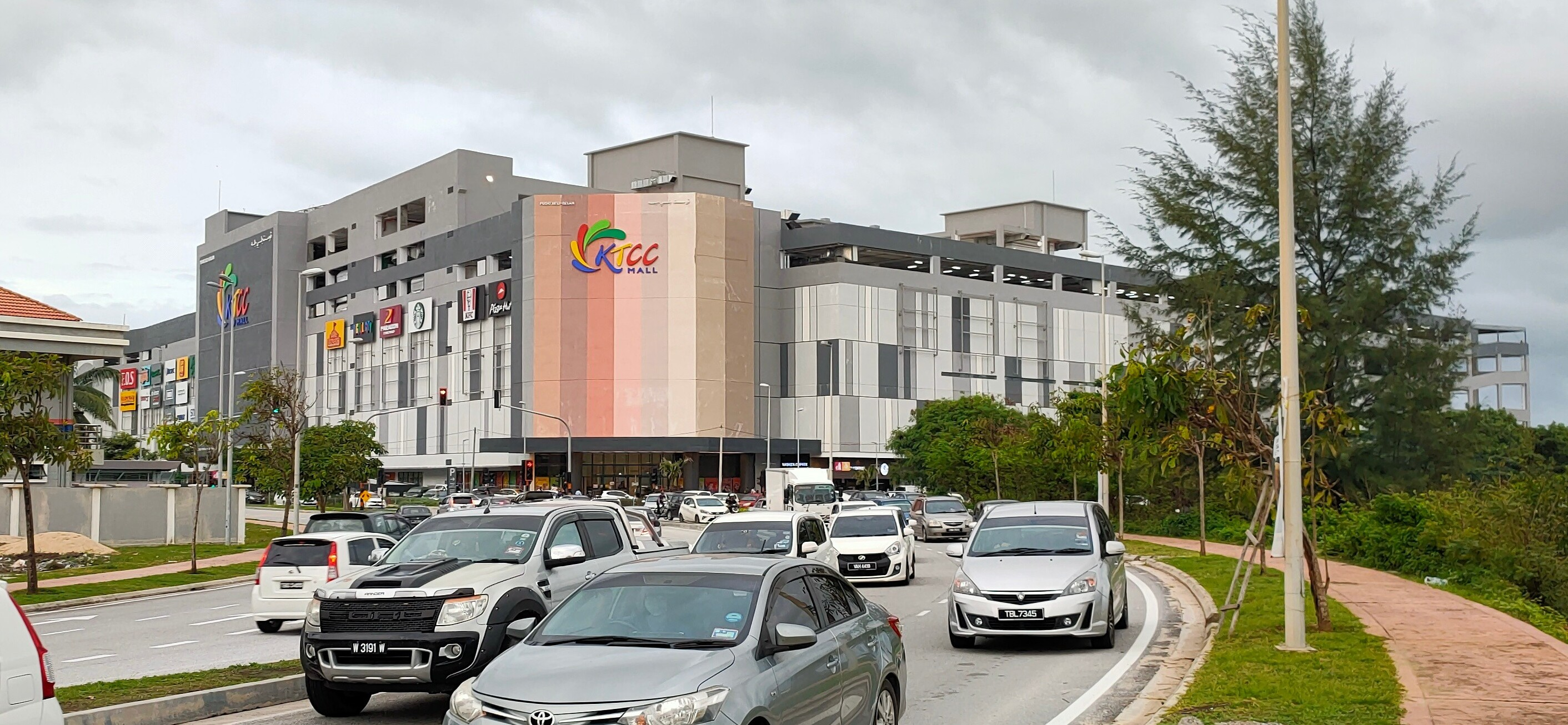
KTCC Mall is a modern mall in the city of Kuala Terengganu, located at the newly developed area of Muara Selatan.

=== Food ===
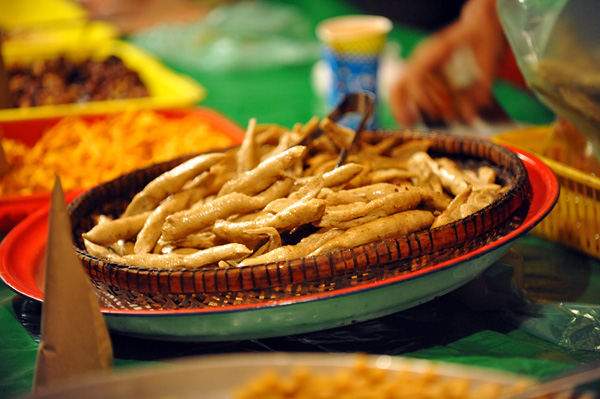
Keropok lekor, the popular local delicacy of Terengganu can be found in and around the city.

Keropok lekor (especially keropok lekor Losong), a local delicacy made from fish and other traditional dishes such as nasi dagang, laksam, laksa Terengganu, otak-otak, sata, pulut lepa, ketupat sotong, and roti paun can be found in the city. In the area of Kampung Cina, Peranakan Chinese cuisine that combines Malay and Chinese cooking styles and other traditional Chinese dishes are available.

=== Media ===
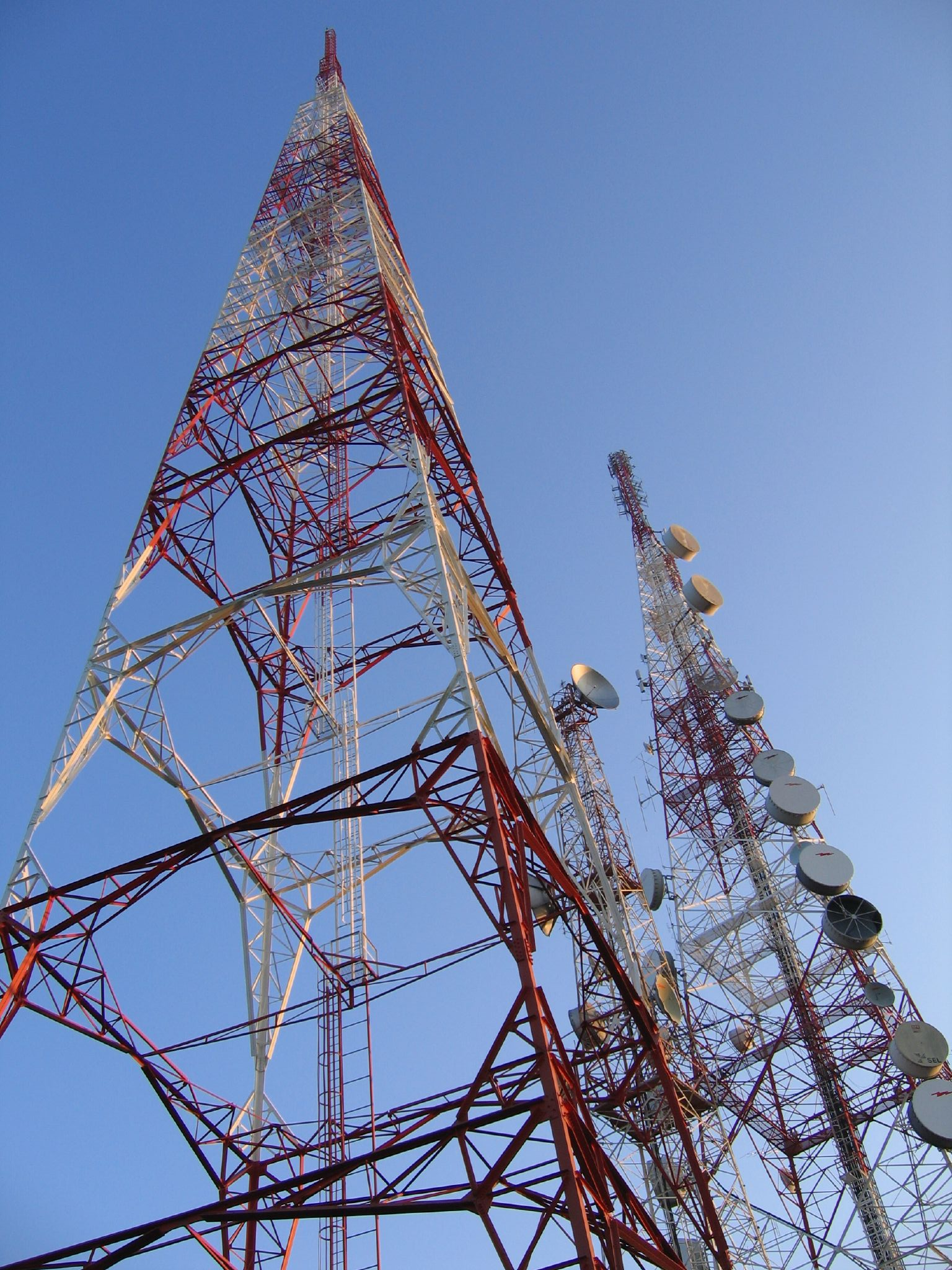
Telecommunication towers on the top of Bukit Besar.

==== Television and radio ====
Kuala Terengganu receives almost all of Malaysian terrestrial television channels. Among the terrestrial television stations that the city receives are TV1, TV2, TV3, NTV7, TV9, and TV Alhijrah. Most radio stations in Malaysia are also available here. The state's radio station, Terengganu FM, the Terengganu feed of the national private radio station, Hot FM Teganu, and first private radio station in the East Coast region, Manis FM, are also operated from this city.

==== Newspapers ====
Among the major Malaysian newspapers available in Kuala Terengganu are:

- English dailies such as The Star and New Straits Times.
- Malay dailies such as Berita Harian, Utusan Malaysia, Harian Metro and Kosmo!.
- Chinese dailies such as Sin Chew Daily, China Press, Kwong Wah Yit Poh, Guang Ming Daily and Nanyang Siang Pau.
- Tamil dailies such as Malaysia Nanban, Tamir Malar and Makkal Osai.

Local newspaper companies also exist. The most widely circulated is Sinar Harian, which provides regional and local news based on its regional editions.

=== Sports ===
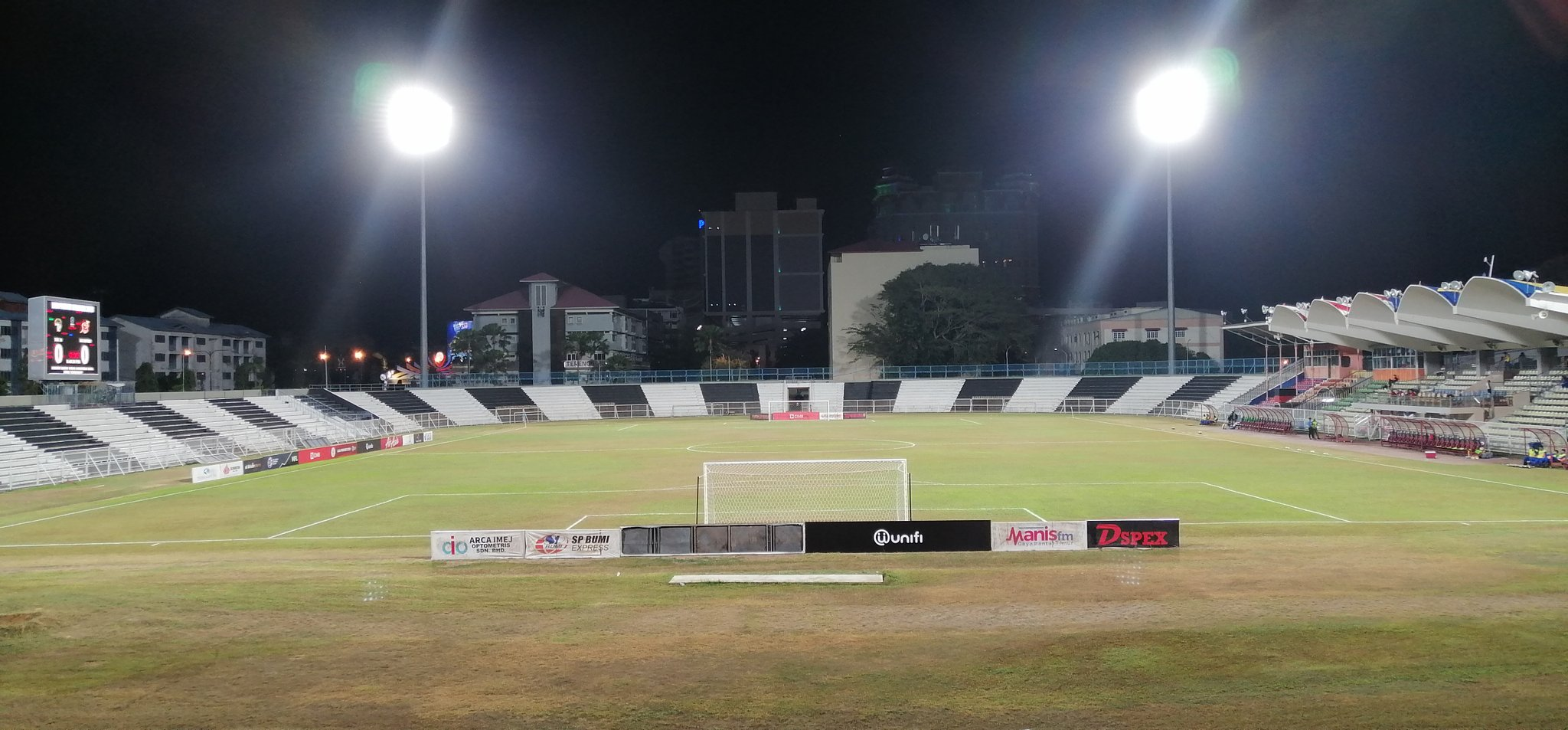
Sultan Ismail Nasiruddin Shah Stadium in 2019

There are two main stadiums, Sultan Ismail Nasiruddin Shah Stadium at the city centre, and Sultan Mizan Zainal Abidin Stadium located at Terengganu Sports Complex, Gong Badak. Both stadiums are the homes of the state's two football teams, Terengganu FC (formerly Terengganu FA), and T-Team FC.

The sports complex was purposely built for the 2008 Malaysian Games (Malay: Sukan Malaysia or SUKMA). Besides the main stadium, the sports complex also contains other facilities such as the Indoor Stadium, football fields, a rugby field, a lawn bowls field, a hockey pitch, and bowling lanes. A sport school to search for new generation athletes is being built to make full use of the facilities provided. Other venues catered for sports in Terengganu are, among others, Kuala Terengganu Aquatic Centre, Kuala Terengganu Hockey Stadium (the home ground for Terengganu Hockey Team), Kuala Terengganu Tennis Courts, and Kuala Terengganu Lawn Bowls Fields. There are three golf courses in Kuala Terengganu, namely the Royal Terengganu Golf Club in Batu Buruk, Ibai Golf & Country Resort in Kuala Ibai, and Kuala Terengganu Golf Resort in Tok Jembal.

Kuala Terengganu has hosted several sporting events such as the 2008 Malaysian Games, the Annual Sultan Mahmud Bridge International Run, The Monsoon Cup (a part of Alpari World Match Racing Tour), The International Beach Sports Carnival, the finals for National Badminton Circuit Competition, and staged the ending and starting points for Le Tour de Langkawi cycling race. Besides that, other international events that the city also hosted included 2017 AFC Beach Soccer Championship at Batu Buruk Beach and the 2017 ITF Terengganu International Junior Championship, held at Padang Hiliran Tennis Stadium.

== International relations ==
Kazakhstan has set up its honorary consulate in Kuala Terengganu.

=== Sister cities ===
Kuala Terengganu's sister city is:

- Makassar, Indonesia
- Palembang, Indonesia

== See also ==
- Kuala Terengganu by-election, 2009
