= List of Mazu temples =

This is a list of Mazu temples, dedicated to Mazu (媽祖) also known as Tian Shang Sheng Mu (天上聖母) or Tian Hou (天后) Chinese Goddess of Sea and Patron Deity of fishermen, sailors and any occupations related to sea/ocean, also regarded as Ancestral Deity for the Lin (林) Clan.

== Australia ==
Official name	Neighborhood	Council	Metropolis	Province	Notes	Image
Heavenly Queen Temple	Footscray	Maribyrnong	Melbourne	Victoria	Opened in 2015. Also known as the Tianhou Gong.	

== Myanmar ==
Official Name			Township	District	Division	Notes	Image
English	Burmese		Township	District	Division	Notes	Image
English	Script	Romanized	Township	District	Division	Notes	Image
Kheng Hock Keong	ခိန့်ဟုတ်ဗုဒ္ဓဘာသာဘုရားကျောင်း	Hkinhut Buddha Bhasabhu Ra:kyaung:	Latha	West Yangon	Yangon	Opened in 1861. Considered a "Buddhist temple" for official purposes. Also known as the Qingfu Gong.	

== China ==
=== Mainland China ===
Official Name			County	Prefecture	Province	Notes	Image
English	Chinese		County	Prefecture	Province	Notes	Image
English	Simplified	Pinyin	County	Prefecture	Province	Notes	Image
City Temple of Shanghai	城隍庙	Chénghuáng Miào	Huangpu	—	Shanghai	Includes an altar to Mazu.	
Tianfei Palace in Liuhe	浏河天妃宫		Taicang	Suzhou	Jiangsu	Originally built in the Song dynasty. Today's structure contains relics from the Yuan dynasty. Listed as a Major National Historical and Cultural Site.	
Old Tianfei Temple	天妃古庙	Tiānfēi Gǔmiào	Gulou	Nanjing	Jiangsu	Built in 2005. Located in the Longjiang Shipyard Park.	
Queen of Heaven Palace	天后宫	Tiānhòu Gōng	Nankai	—	Tianjin	Also known as the Niangniang Temple, part of the city's Ancient Culture Street.	
Sea Goddess Palace	天后宫	Tiānhòu Gōng	Yinzhou	Ningbo	Zhejiang	Also known as the Qing'an Hall. Now used as the East Zhejiang Maritime Affairs and Folk Customs Museum.	
Tianfei Palace	天妃宫	Tiānfēi Gōng	Songjiang	—	Shanghai	Also known as the Tianhou Palace, officially the Mazu Cultural Palace. Rebuilt from ruins relocated from its original location near Suzhou Creek downtown to Fangta Park.	
Tianfei Palace	天妃宫	Tiānfēi Gōng		Nanjing	Jiangsu	Located east of Jinghai Temple.	
Tianhou Palace	天后宫	Tiānhòu Gōng	Nansha	Guangzhou	Guangdong	Also known as the Meizhou Ancestral Temple.	
Temple of Mazu	?	?	Jiexiu	Jinzhong	Shanxi	Part of the complex of temples clustered around Mt Mian, a holy site since late antiquity primarily associated with the myths around Jie Zhitui and the Cold Food Festival.	
Original Temple of Mazu	妈祖祖庙	Mazu Zumiao	Meizhou Island, Xiuyu District	Putian	Fujian	Originally built as a small shrine in the 10th century.	
Queen of Heaven Temple in Yantai	煙台市天后行宮	Yantai Shi Tianhou Xinggong	Yantai		Shandong		Mazu Temple (Yantai)
	庙岛显应宫		Miaodao Island, Changdao	Yantai	Shandong		

=== Macao ===
Official Name				Parish	Notes	Image
English	Chinese			Parish	Notes	Image
English	Simplified	Pinyin	Cantonese	Parish	Notes	Image
A-Ma Temple	媽閣廟	Mā Gé Miào	Mā Gok Miuh; Ma Kok Miu	São Lourenço	At least as old as 1488, with the present setup dating to 1828. Probable namesake of Macao. Also known as Tianhou, Barra, Juehai, or Zhongjue Temple.	

== Taiwan ==
Official Name			District	County	Notes	Image
English	Chinese		District	County	Notes	Image
English	Traditional	Pinyin	District	County	Notes	Image
Chaotian Temple	朝天宮	Cháotiān Gōng	Beigang	Yunlin	Opened in 1700, repeatedly renovated. Also known as the Tianhou or Tianfei Temple.	
Cide Palace	慈德宮	Cídé Gōng	Zuoying	Kaohsiung	Rebuilt from its former ruin 1976. Also known as the Liujia, Dianziding, Mazu, or Tianhou Temple.	
Ciyou Temple	慈祐宮	Cíyòu Gōng	Songshan	Taipei	Opened in 1753.	
Jenn Lann Temple	鎮瀾宮	Zhènlán Gōng	Dajia	Taichung	Opened in 1730. Also known as the Mazu Temple.	
Gongfan Temple	拱範宮	Gǒngfàn Gōng	Mailiao	Yunlin	Opened in its present site in 1742.	
Grand Matsu Temple	大天后宮	Da Tianhou Gōng	West Central	Tainan	Built in 1664 as the palace of the exiled Ming prince Zhu Shugui, used by Shi Lang as his headquarters following the Qing conquest of Taiwan in 1683, and converted to a Mazu temple—the first to use her new title of Tianhou—by the Kangxi Emperor the next year.	
Guandu Temple	關渡宮	Guāndù Gōng	Beitou	Taipei	Opened in 1712. Also known as Lingshan Temple.	
Leh Cherng Temple	樂成宮	Lecheng Gong	East	Taichung	Moved in 1791, rebuilt in 1928 and 1963. Also known as the Lecheng Temple.	
Lungshan Temple	龍山寺	Longshan Si	Wanhua	Taipei	Opened in 1738, rebuilt in 1924. A Buddhist temple to Guanyin whose rear hall is dedicated to Mazu.	
Peitian Temple	配天宮	Pèitiān Gōng	Puzi	Chiayi	Opened in 1682	
Tianhou Temple	天后宮	Tiānhòu Gōng	Xinwu	Taoyuan	Opened in 1826. Includes world's 3rd-tallest statue of Mazu.	
Tianhou Temple	天后宮	Tiānhòu Gōng	Lukang	Changhua	Also known as the Tianhou or Tienhou Palace.	
Tianhou Temple	天后宮	Tiānhòu Gōng	Cijin	Kaohsiung	Opened in 1673. Also known as the Cijin or Cihou Tianhou Temple.	
Tianhou Temple	天后宮	Tiānhòu Gōng	Magong	Penghu	Usually reckoned Taiwan's oldest Mazu temple.	
Wanhe Temple	萬和宮	Wànhé Gōng	Nantun	Taichung	Opened in 1726, rebuilt in 2001.	

- Taipei Mazu Temple

== Japan ==
Official Name			Municipality	Prefecture	Notes	Image
English	Japanese		Municipality	Prefecture	Notes	Image
English	Characters	Romaji	Municipality	Prefecture	Notes	Image
Tomeizan Kofukuji	東明山興福寺	Tōmeizan Kōfuku-ji	Nagasaki	Nagasaki	Includes a Mazu Hall (Masu-do), also known as the Bodhisattva Hall (Bosa-do). First opened by Chinese merchants in the 17th century, destroyed by the 1663 fire, rebuilt c. 1670.	
Ma Zhu Miao	横浜媽祖廟	Masobyō	Yokohama	Kanagawa	Opened in 2006.	
Sōfuku-ji (Nagasaki)	崇福寺	Soufuku-ji	Nagasaki	Nagasaki	Includes a Mazu Hall (Masu-do).	
Tokyo Mazu Temple	東京媽祖廟	Tokyo Masobyō	Shinjuku	Tokyo	Opened in 1913.	
Oma Inari Temple	大間稲荷神社	Oma Inari Jinja	Shimokita	Aomori	Opened in 1730.	

== Malaysia ==
Official name	Subdistrict	District	State	Notes	Image
Thean Hou Temple	Taman Persiaran Desa	Seputeh	Kuala Lumpur	Opened in 1989. Hokkien for Tianhou Palace, though built by Hainanese living in Malaysia	
Seng Choon Keong	Kampung Tok'kong	Kota Bharu	Kelantan	Founded around 300 years ago.	
Ho Ann Kiong Temple	Kampung Cina	Kuala Terengganu	Terengganu	Founded in 1801, restored in 2012 after the 2010 fire.	
Tien How Temple	Batu Pahat	Batu Pahat	Johor	Founded in 1912. Also known as Ma Chor Keng or Lim Sz Chong Su Temple.	
Tien Hou Sen Mu Temple	Klang	Klang	Selangor		
Thin Hai Temple	Klang	Klang	Selangor		
Tian Hou Temple	Alor Setar Pekan Kebun 500	Kota Setar Pokok Sena	Kedah	Temporarily relocated in Taman Perindustrian Tandop Utama. Will be relocated to Kebun 500, Pokok Sena, Kedah. Dedicated to Nanyang Mazu (南洋媽祖), a localized Mazu adorned with Peranakan attire.	
Mazu Temple	Kuala Kurau	Kerian	Perak		

== Philippines ==
Official name	Town	Province	Notes	Image
Ma-Cho Temple	San Fernando	La Union	Opened in 1975. Annual celebrations syncretize Mazu's worship with Our Lady of Caysasay at St Martin's Basilica in Taal.	

== Singapore ==
Official name	Area	Notes	Image
Thian Hock Keng	Outram	Founded in 1839 by Hokkien clan, rebuilt 1842 and 2000. Also known as the Tianfu Gong.	
Yueh Hai Ching Temple	Downtown Core	Founded in 1826 by a Teochew clan, moved in 1855, rebuilt in 1895 and 1997. Also known as the Temple of the Calm Sea, Yuehaiqing Miao, and Wak Hai Cheng Bio; consist of two main shrines, one dedicated to Mazu and the other shrine dedicated to the Xuantian Shangdi.	

== Thailand ==
Official Name			District	Province	Notes	Image
English	Thai		District	Province	Notes	Image
English	Script	Romanized	District	Province	Notes	Image
Wat San Chao Chet	ศาลเจ้าเจ็ด	San Chao Chet	Bang Rak	Bangkok	Also known as the Qishengma Temple.	
San Chao Qishegma	ศาลเจ้าชิดเซี้ยม้า	San Chao Qishegma	Pom Prap Sattru Phai	Bangkok	Located between 22 July Circle and Hua Lamphong Railway Station, established in the reign of King Rama V (corresponds to the reign of Guangxu Emperor).	
San Chao Ah Ma Keng	ศาลเจ้าอาม้าเก็ง	San Chao Ah Ma Keng	Samphanthawong	Bangkok	Located on the 4th floor of Laemthong Pochana restaurant, Soi Charoen Krung 12, also known as Soi Bamrung Rat.	
San Chao Hok Lian Keng	ศาลเจ้าฮกเลี่ยนเก็ง	San Chao Hok Lian Keng	Samphanthawong	Bangkok	Located in Soi Charoen Krung 20 in Talat Noi quarter, established in 1840 in the 10th year of Xianfeng Emperor's reign by overseas Chinese Hoklo.	
San Chao Mae Tai Wa	ศาลเจ้าแม่ไท้วา	San Chao Mae Tai Wa	Samphanthawong	Bangkok	Located along Khlong Phadung Krung Kasem in Talat Noi quarter.	
San Chao Tianhou Shengow	ศาลเจ้าเทียนโหวเซียโกว	San Chao Tianhou Shengow	Thon Buri	Bangkok	Also known as the Gowbow Shrine.	
San Chao Mae Thaptim Khlong San	ศาลเจ้าแม่ทับทิม คลองสาน	San Chao Mae Thaptim Khlong San	Khlong San	Bangkok	Inside Lhong 1919.	
San Chao Mae Thaptim	ศาลเจ้าแม่ทับทิม	San Chao Mae Thaptim	Chom Thong	Bangkok	Considered as the oldest Mazu temple in Thailand founded in 1834, restored in 1874 by Hoklo, also known as Tianhou Shenbow Shrine or Pun Tao Ma Shrine.	
San Chao Mae Thaptim Saphan Han	ศาลเจ้าแม่ทับทิม สะพานหัน	San Chao Mae Thaptim Saphan Han	Phra Nakhon	Bangkok	The only Mazu shrine in Rattanakosin Island or Bangkok's old town zone.	
San Chao Mae Thaptim	ศาลเจ้าแม่ทับทิม	San Chao Mae Thaptim	Sathon	Bangkok	Located between Soi Charoen Krung 63 and Soi Charoen Krung 65 near Saphan Taksin BTS Station, also known as Ah Ma Shrine.	
San Chao Mae Thaptim Saphan Lueang	ศาลเจ้าแม่ทับทิม สะพานเหลือง	San Chao Mae Thaptim Saphan Lueang	Pathum Wan	Bangkok	Located in the Sam Yan quarter, also known as Tianhou Shrine.	
San Chao Mae Thaptim (Chin) Khao Sam Muk	ศาลเจ้าแม่ทับทิม (จีน) เขาสามมุข	San Chao Mae Thaptim (Chin) Khao Sam Muk	Mueang Chonburi	Chonburi	Located on Khao Sam Muk by the sea near Bang Saen Beach.	
Chao Mae Tomo Shrine	?	San Chao Mae Thaptim	Sungai Golok	Narathiwat	in Pattani	
?	?	?			in Phuket	

== United States and Canada ==
Official name	Town	State	Notes	Image
Ma-Tsu Temple	San Francisco	California	Opened in 1986.	
Thien Hau Temple (Austin)	Austin	Texas	Opened in 1995.	
Thien Hau Temple (Los Angeles)	Los Angeles	California	Opened in 1982, renovated in 2006.	
Tin How Temple	San Francisco	California	Opened in 1852, closed 1950s to 1975. Occupies the top floor of a 4-story building.	
Tin Hau Temple	Honolulu	Hawaii	Opened in 1889.	
Mazu Temple	Toronto(GTA)	Ontario Canada	Opened in 2016, the first Mazu Temple of Canada.	

== Vietnam ==
Official Name		County	Prefecture	Province	Notes	Image
English	Vietnamese	County	Prefecture	Province	Notes	Image
Thien Hau Temple (Quang Trieu Guildhall)	Miếu Thiên Hậu	District 1	—	Ho Chi Minh City	A temple of Cantonese people.	
Thien Hau Temple (Tue Thanh Guildhall)	Chùa Bà Thiên Hậu	District 5	—	Ho Chi Minh City	Opened c. 1760. Also known as Thien Hau or Tianhou Temple.	
Quan Am Temple (On Lang Guildhall)	Chùa Quan Âm	District 5	—	Ho Chi Minh City	A temple to Guanyin including an altar to Mazu as Thien Hau or A Pho.	
Thien Hau Temple (Ha Chuong Guildhall)	Chùa Bà Hà Chương	District 5	—	Ho Chi Minh City	A temple of Hokkien people.	
Hainan Thien Hau Temple (Quynh Phu Guildhall)	Chùa Bà Hải Nam	District 5	—	Ho Chi Minh City	A temple of Hainan people.	
Thien Hau Temple (Tam Son Guildhall)	Thiên Hậu Cung	District 5	—	Ho Chi Minh City	A temple of Fuzhou people.	
Thien Hau Temple	Thiên Hậu Cung			Binh Duong		
