= The Chronicle of the East Sea =

The Chronicle of East Sea (Chinese: 東瀛紀事) was written by Lin Hao (林豪) in the Qing Dynasty. Published in 1880, the book adopts an event-centered approach of historical writing (紀事本末體) to record the Tai Chao-chun incident. The book is also known as the Dongming Chronicles.

== Background ==
Lin Hao (1831 - 1918), a native of Houpu in Kinmen, is celebrated as the most prolific writer to migrate to Taiwan in the Qing Dynasty. He stayed in Taiwan mainly from 1862 to 1894, and once lived in Lin Chan-mei's Chien Garden (潛園). During his stay in Taiwan, Lin Hao collected literary data, conducted field research, and compiled many historical works related to Taiwan. The works that have survived to this day include The Chronicle of the East Sea, Tamsui Subprefecture Annals: Corrections (淡水廳志訂謬), and Penghu Subprefecture Annals (澎湖廳志).

== Contents ==
The Chronicle of the East Sea is divided into two volumes, outlining the events in a straightforward manner. The narrative fully depicts the developments and vividly portrays the characters.

The first volume describes the outbreak in the sections "Tai's Rebellion" (戴逆倡亂), "Bandits Seize Changhua" (賊陷彰化城), followed by sections describing the response of various areas, including "County Defense Plans” (郡治籌防始末)" "Lukang Defense and Suppression”(鹿港防剿始末), "Northern Route Defense and Suppression" (北路防剿始末), "Tachia Defense" (大甲城守), "Chiayi Defense" (嘉義城守), and "Southern Route Defense and Suppression" (南路防剿始末). It also describes the process by which the government army confronted Tai Chao-chun's forces in "Tuku's Resistance against Bandits" (塗庫拒賊始末), "Wengtzushe Garrison" (翁仔社屯軍始末), "Government Army Recovers Changhua County" (官軍收復彰化縣始末), "Rebel Leader Tai Chao-chun Executed" (逆首戴潮春伏誅), "Tiger Sheng Executed" (憨虎晟伏誅), "Remaining Bandits" (餘匪), and so on. In addition, the section "The Fall of Touliu Gate" (斗六門之陷) illustrates the significant defeats suffered by the government army. There are also additional "Omens" (災祥), "Miscellaneous Discussions (Part 1)" (叢談［上］), and "Miscellaneous Discussions (Part 2)" (叢談[下]).

== Reception ==
Lien Heng (連橫) once praised The Chronicle of the East Sea as "a work of history written methodically.” Scholar Hong Li-mei (洪麗玫) also pointed out that the book has significance that cannot be overlooked in terms of both literature and history.
