= Ho Ann Kiong Temple =

Chinese temple in Kuala Terengganu, Malaysia

- Malay: Tokong Ho Ann Kiong; Chinese: 护安宫
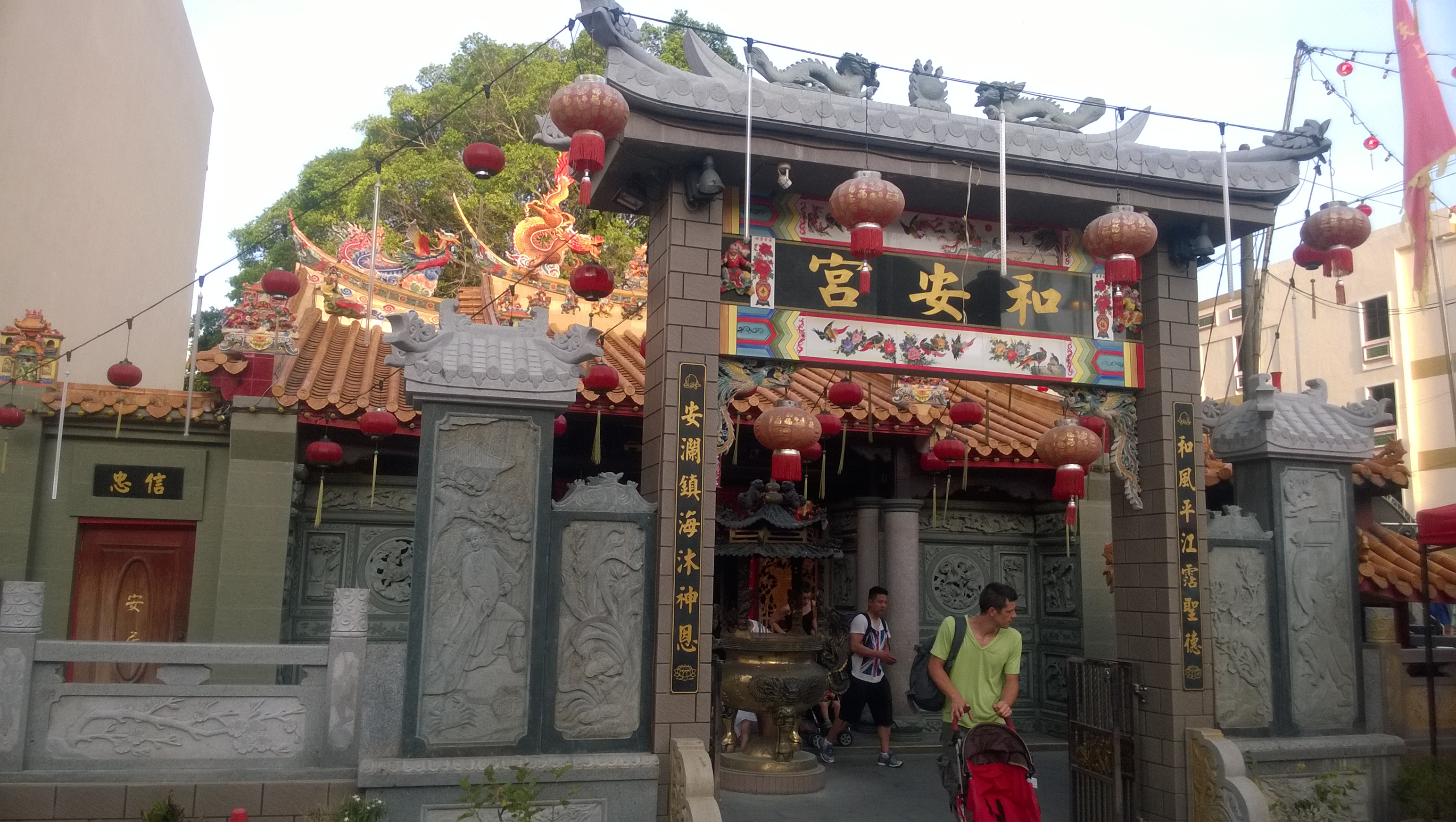

Religion
- Affiliation: Taoism
- District: Kuala Terengganu District
- Deity: Mazu
- Year consecrated: 1801

Location
- Location: Kuala Terengganu
- Municipality: Kuala Terengganu
- State: Terengganu
- Country: Malaysia
- Interactive map of Ho Ann Kiong Temple
- Coordinates: 5°19′57.803″N 103°7′58.285″E

Architecture
- Type: Chinese temple
- Established: 1801
- Completed: 2012 (rebuilt)
- Destroyed: 2010 (partial)

Ho Ann Kiong Temple
- Traditional Chinese: 護安宮
- Simplified Chinese: 护安宫
Transcriptions
Standard Mandarin
- Hanyu Pinyin: Hù Ān Gōng
- Wade–Giles: Hu⁴ An¹ Kung¹
Southern Min
- Hokkien POJ: Hō͘ An Kiong

Ho Ann Kiong Temple (Malay: Tokong Ho Ann Kiong; Chinese: 护安宫) is a Chinese temple situated in Chinatown of Kuala Terengganu, Terengganu, Malaysia. It is the oldest Taoist temple in the state as part of the Chinatown.

== History ==
The temple was built in 1801 by early Chinese immigrants in Terengganu to fulfil their religious obligations. With the establishment of another temple known as Tian Hou Gong Temple in the area, the number of devotees slowly decreased and the building fell into disrepair. A deadly epidemic then occurred in 1915 with half of the town population wiped out. Suffering from a limited medical supplies at the time, the population immediately returned to praying in the temple to ask for mercy from the deities for cure. Their appeal would be answered under a condition that the temple building should be repaired. The town population subsequently agreed to the condition and following the repair, the epidemic miraculously dissipated.

In the week after Chinese New Year in 2010, half of the temple building was suddenly ravaged by fire. Having learnt the lesson from the older town population, the newer generations immediately raised series of funds to repair and restore the damaged temple. The temple was then fully restored in 2012 with a total cost of RM1.3 million.

== Image gallery ==
Gallery of images of Ho Ann Kiong Temple, Kuala Terengganu

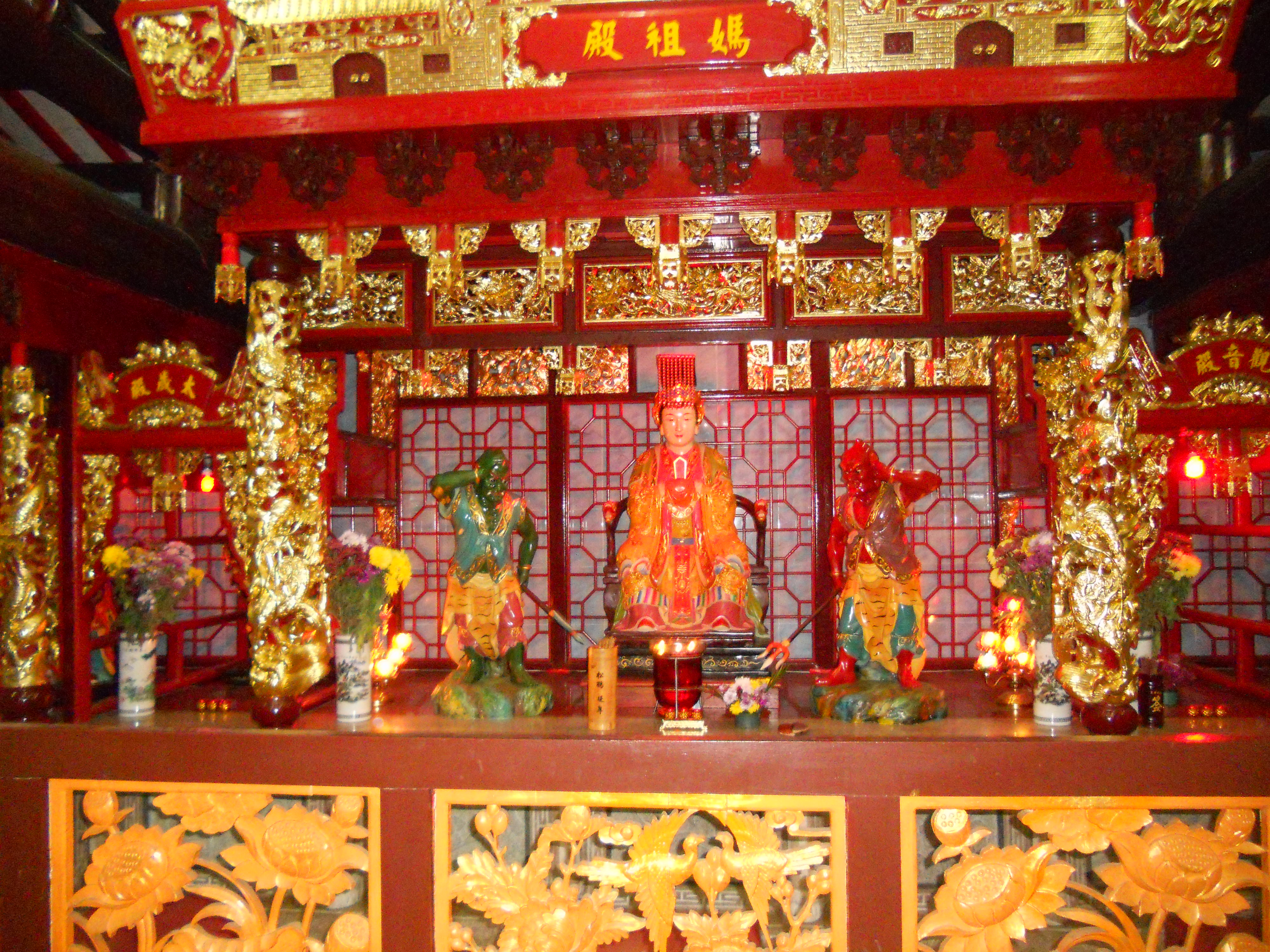
Altar of Ho Ann Kiong Temple, Kuala Terengganu.

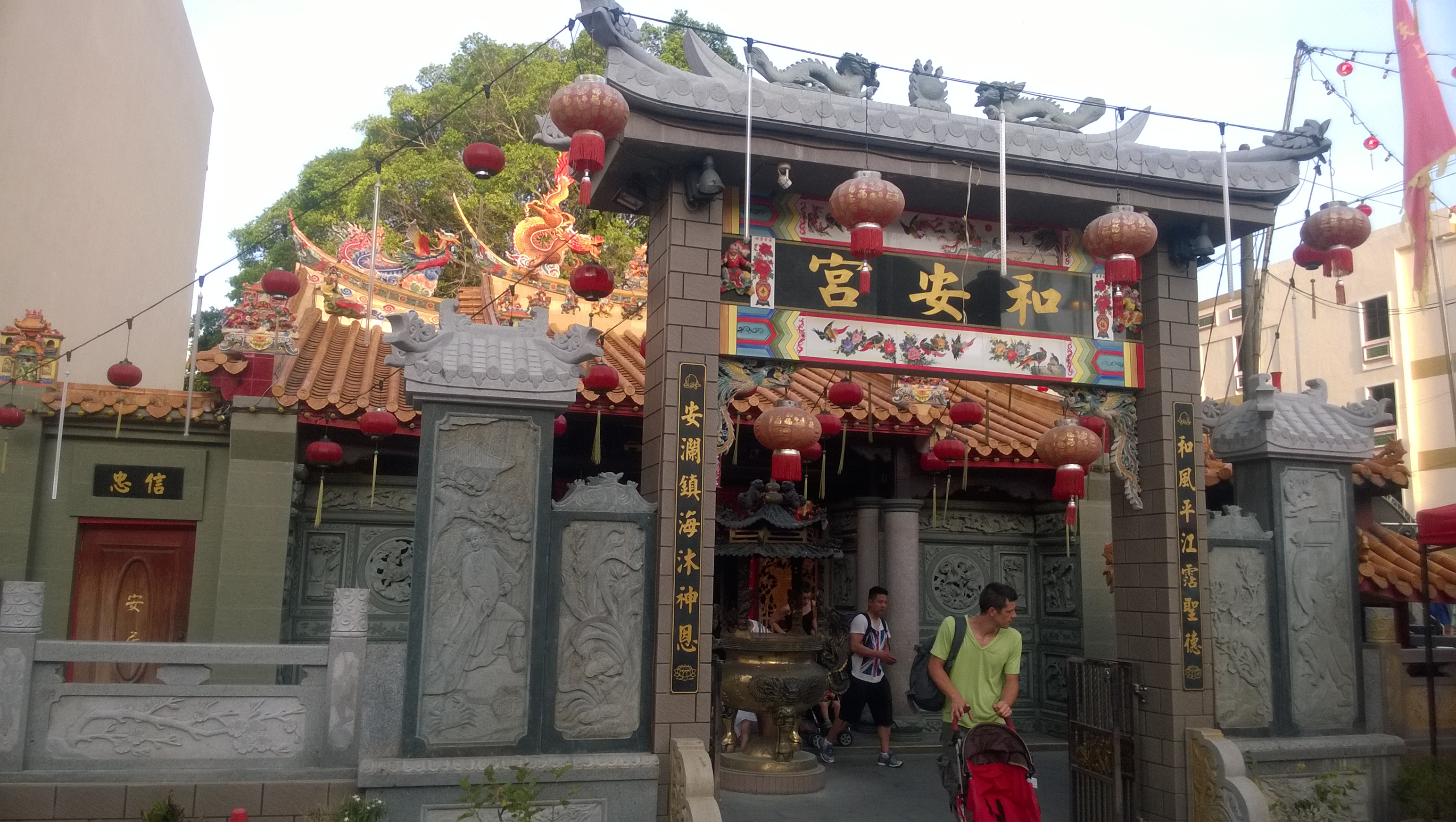
Entrance of Ho Ann Kiong Temple, Kuala Terengganu.
