= Yokohama Ma Zu Miao =

Chinese temple in Yokohama, Japan

Coordinates: 35.4421°N 139.6476°E

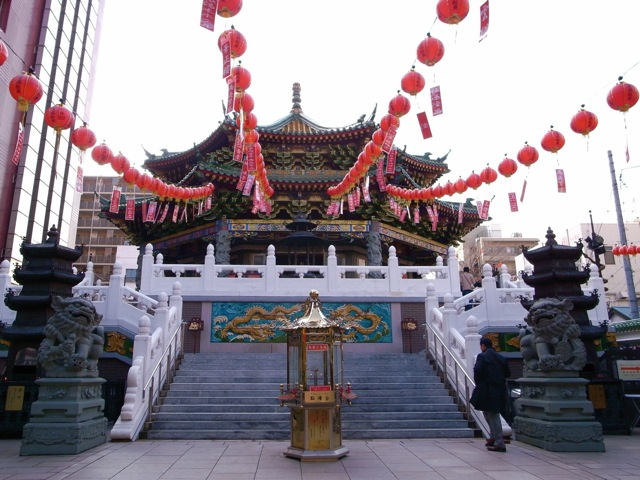
Yokohama Mazu temple

The Yokohama Ma Zu Miao (横濱媽祖廟, Yokohama Masobyō) is a temple of the Chinese Goddess Mazu located in Yokohama, Japan. It opened on 17 March 2006. It is located in Yokohama's Chinatown.

== See also ==
- Qianliyan & Shunfeng'er
- List of Mazu temples around the world
- Grand Matsu Temple
- Tokyo Mazu Temple
