= Tokyo Mazu Temple =

Coordinates: 35.6990972°N 139.6975489°E

- 東京媽祖廟
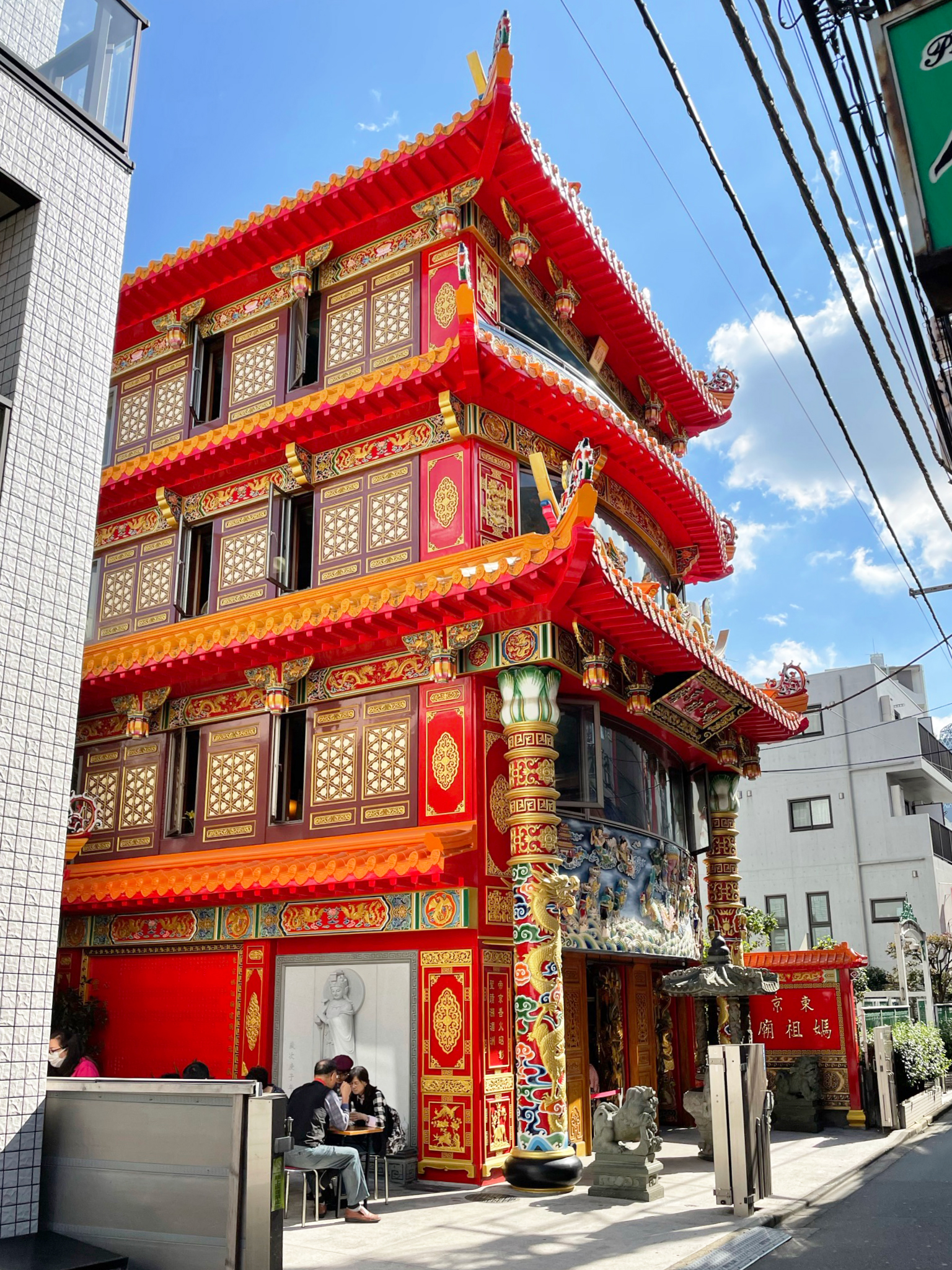

Religion
- Affiliation: Taoism
- Prefecture: Tokyo
- Region: Kantō
- Deity: Mazu
- Ownership: Japan Mazu Association
- Status: Active

Location
- Municipality: Shinjuku
- Country: Japan
- Interactive map of Tokyo Mazu Temple
- Prefecture: Tokyo

Architecture
- Established: October 2013

Website
- maso.jp

The Tokyo Mazu Temple (Japanese: 東京媽祖廟) is a Taiwanese temple dedicated to the sea goddess Mazu, located in Shinjuku, Tokyo, Japan. It opened in October 2013.

== Overview ==
The Tokyo Mazu Temple, planned mainly by the Japan Mazu Association, was built on a land near Okubo, Shinjuku, Tokyo, where a relatively large number of Taiwan people live. It officially opened on October 13, 2013. Its address is 1-24-12 Hyakunin-cho, Shinjuku-ku, Tokyo 169-0073.

The Tokyo Mazu Temple is housed in a four-story building, with the first floor being the reception and office, the second floor the Guan Yu hall, the third floor the Mazu hall, and the 4th floor the Guanyin hall.

== Transportation ==
The Tokyo Mazu Temple is located in a convenient place:

- One minute walk from the south exit of Okubo Station on JR East's Chuo-Sobu Line (中央・総武緩行線)
- Four minutes' walk from Shin-Okubo Station on R East's Yamanote Line

== Gallery ==
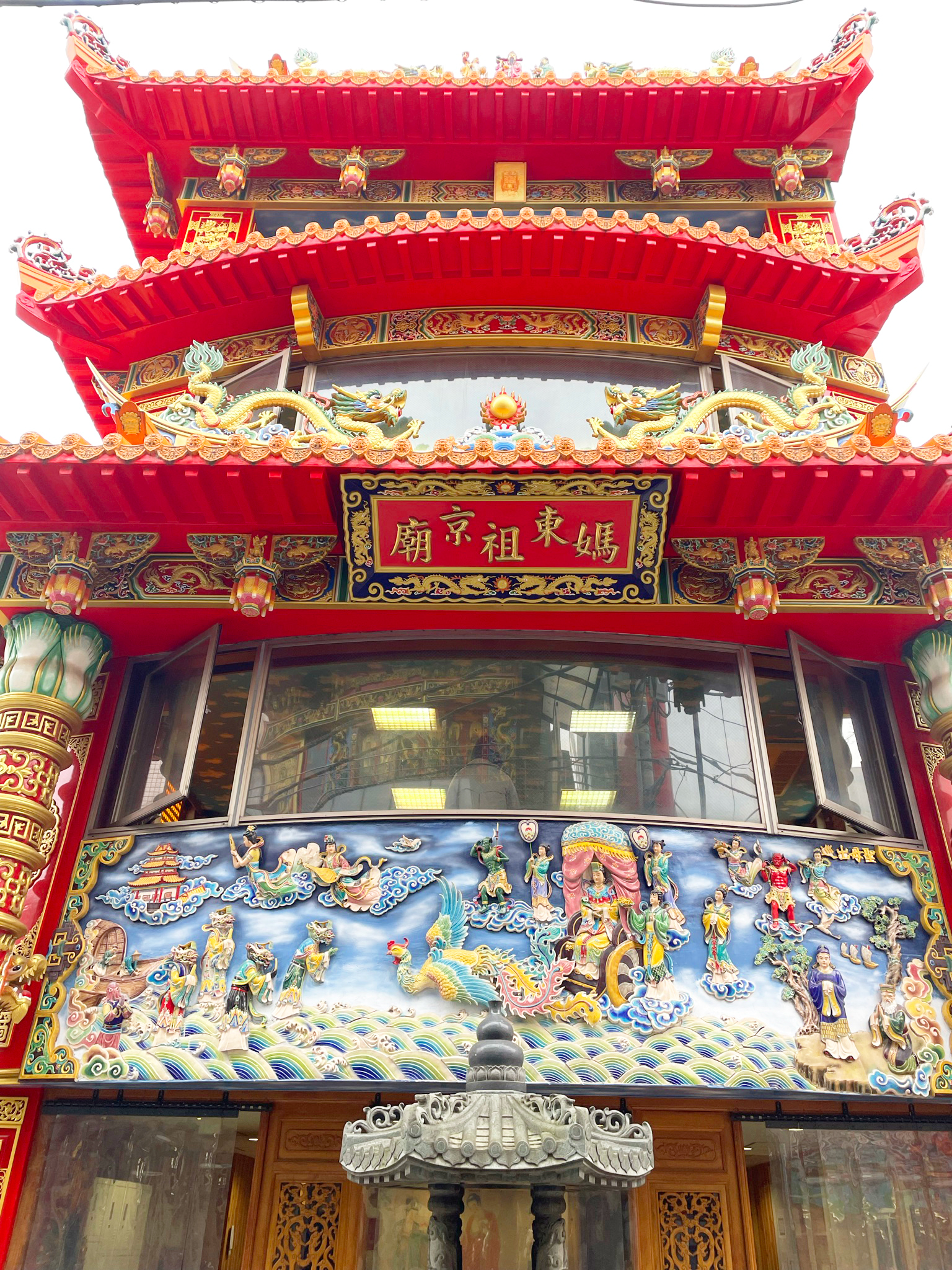
Front

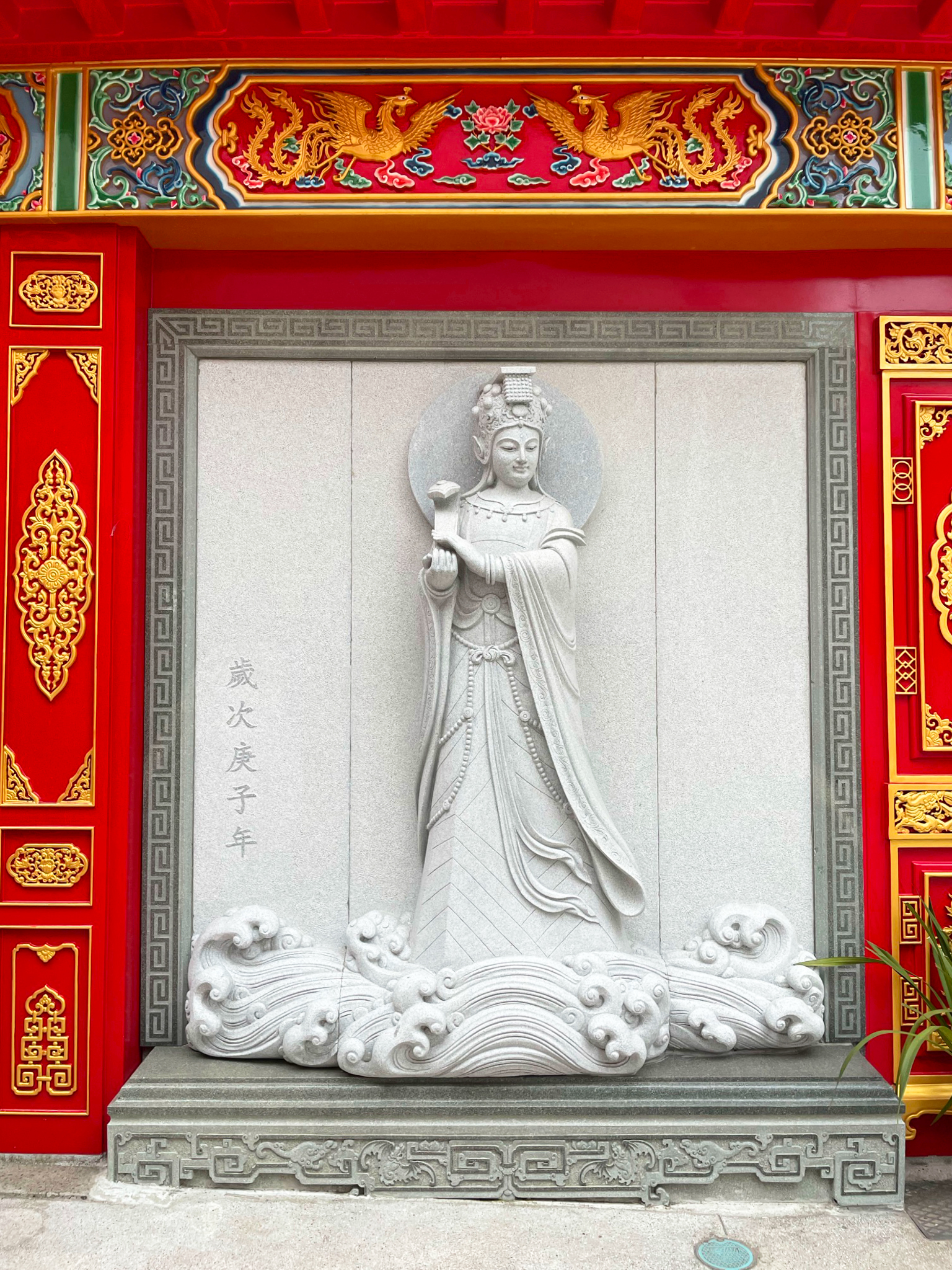
Relief

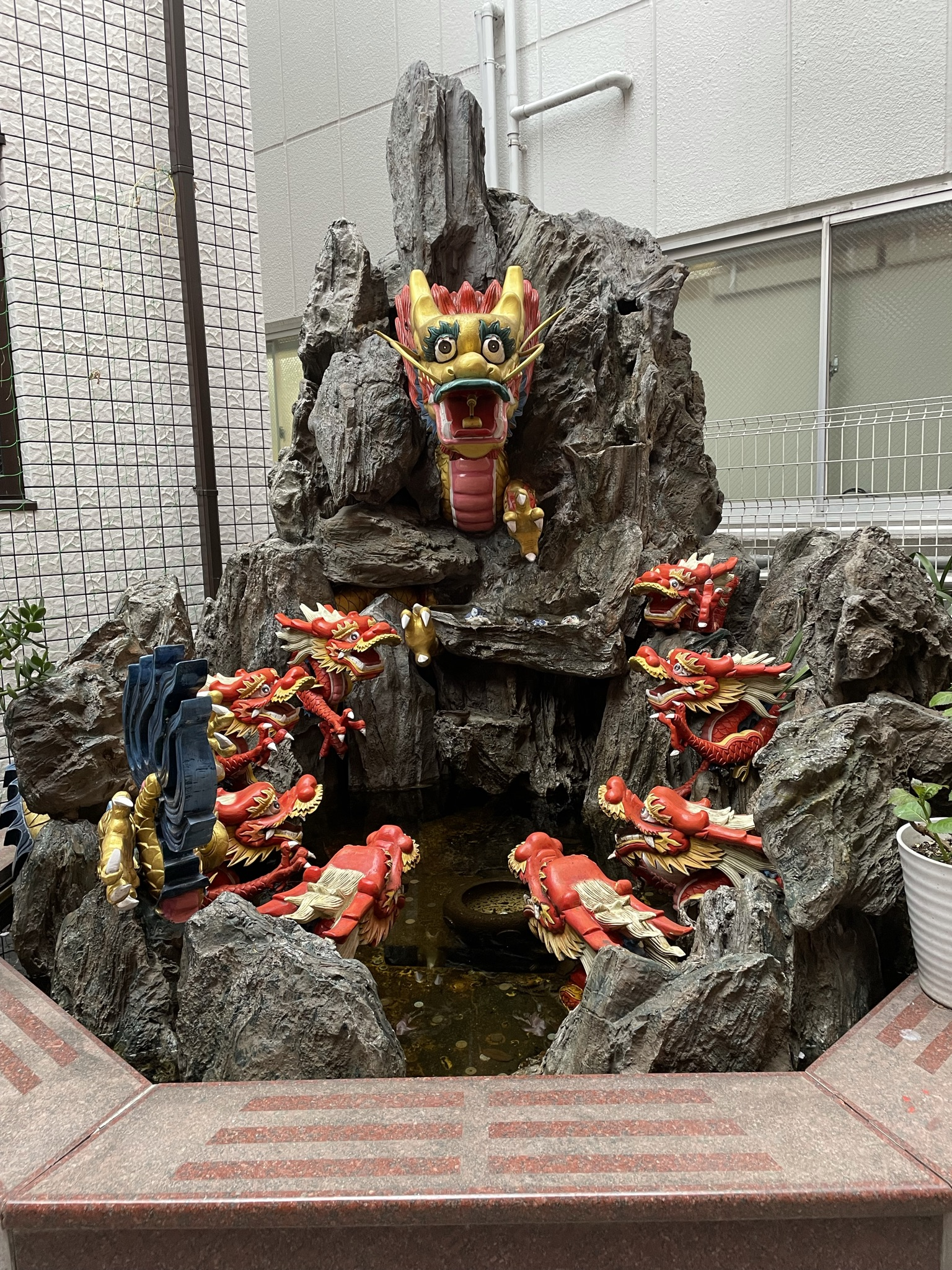
Garden

== See also ==
- List of Mazu temples around the world
- Qianliyan & Shunfeng'er
- Yokohama Mazu Temple

== Enternal links ==
- Official site
