= Taipei Mazu Temple =

Temple in Wanhua, Taipei, Taiwan

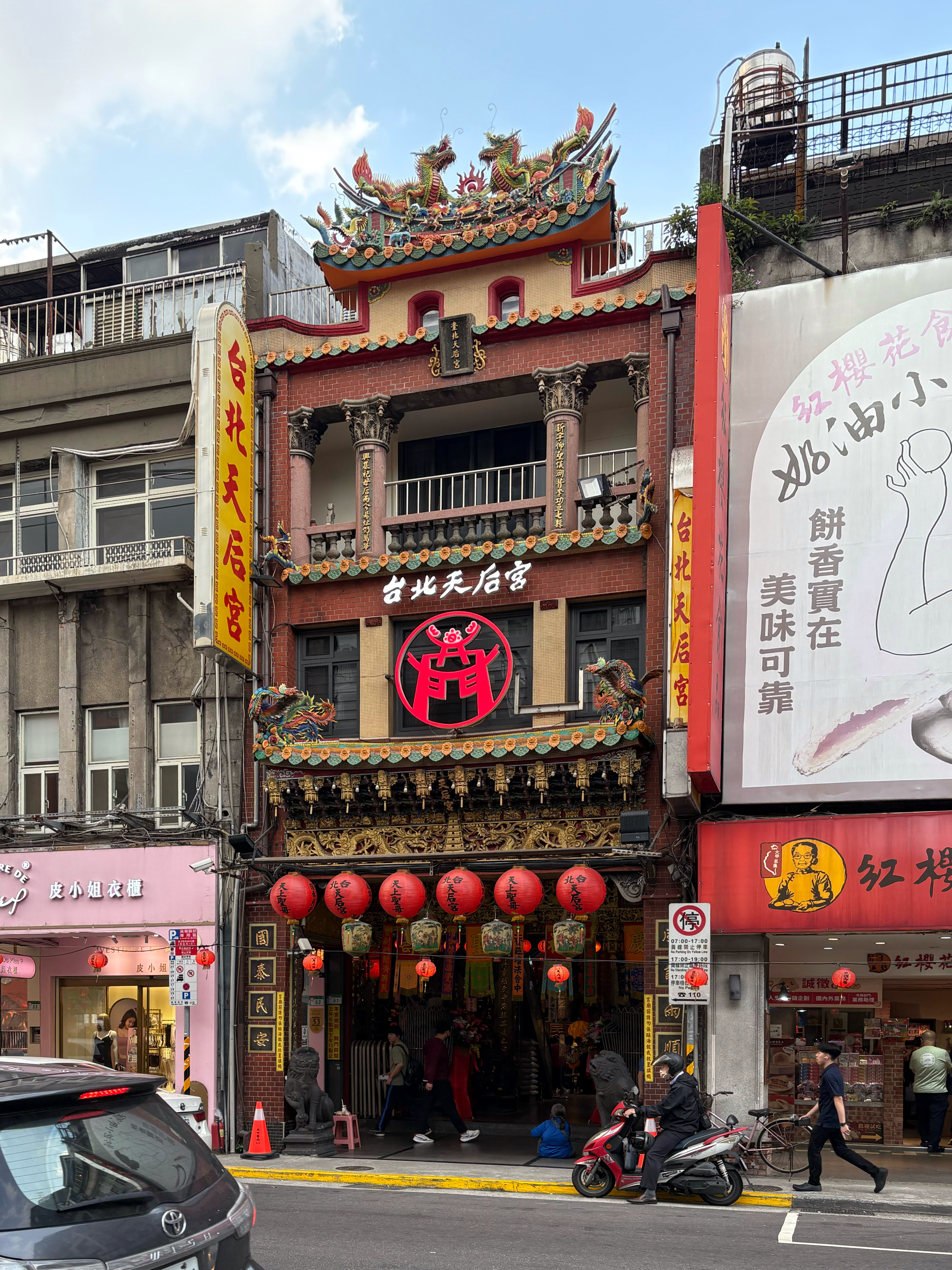
- The temple's exterior in 2025

Location
- Country: Taiwan
- Interactive map of Taipei Mazu Temple

Taipei Mazu Temple, formerly known as Monga Xinxing Temple, commonly known as Ximending Tianhou Temple and Ximending Mazu Temple, is a Mazu Temple located in Wanhua District, Taipei, Taiwan. It is dedicated to worshiping Tianhou Mazu.

The temple site was originally a Japanese Buddhist temple. Mengga Longshan Temple and Mengga Patriarch Temple are collectively known as the "Three Great Temples of Menga". After the temples were moved, local people renamed them "Mengga Longshan Temple, Mengga Mengga's Three Great Temples", or collectively referred to Longshan Temple, Patriarch Temple, Qingshan Royal Palace and the main temple as the "Four Great Temples of Menga".

== See also ==
- List of Mazu temples
- List of temples in Taiwan
