= Wanhe Temple =

Temple in Nantun District, Taichung, Taiwan

- 萬和宮
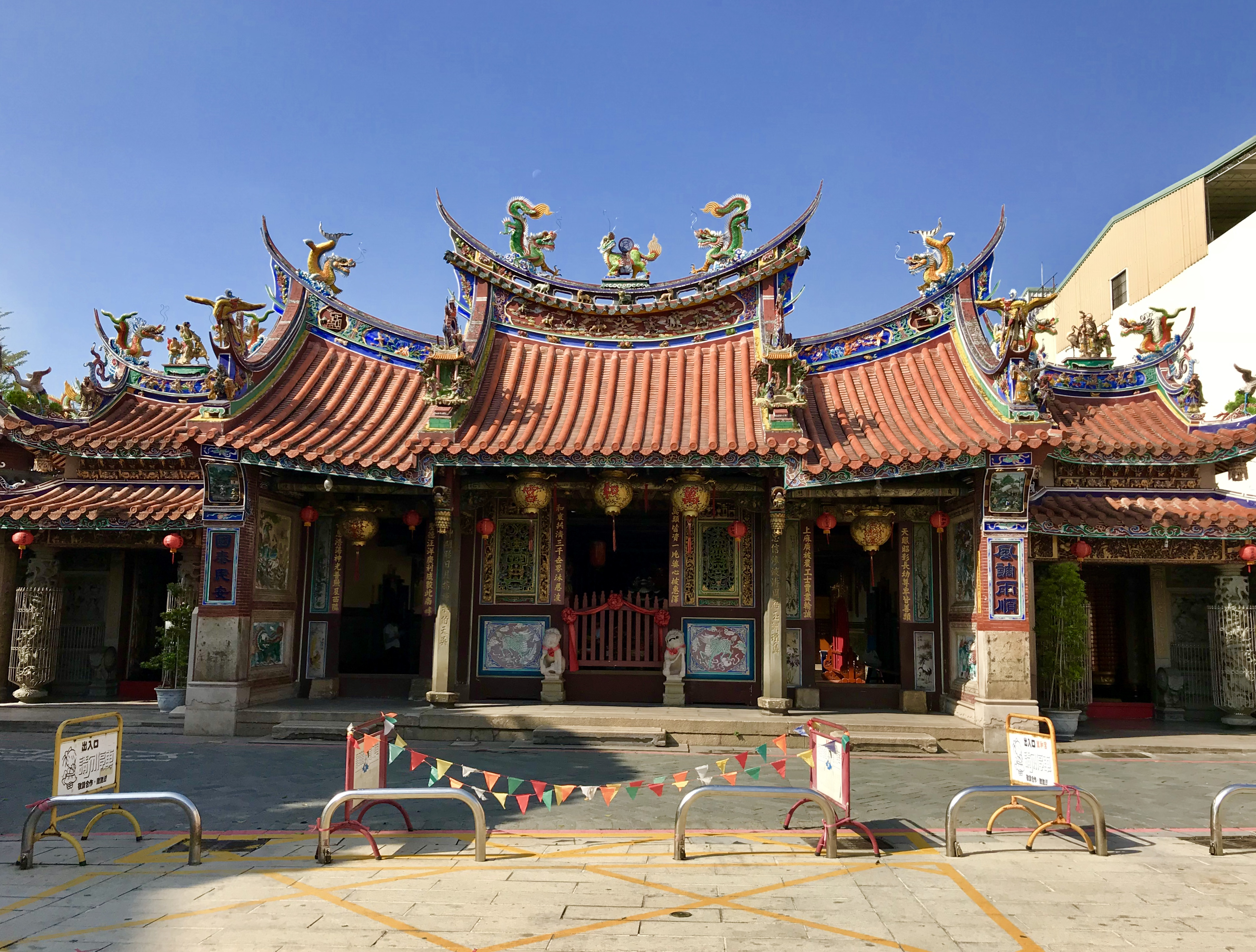
- Temple facade

Religion
- Deity: Mazu

Location
- Location: Nantun District, Taichung
- Country: Taiwan
- Interactive map of Wanhe Temple
- Coordinates: 24.1379°N 120.6390°E

Architecture
- Completed: 1726
- Direction of façade: East

Wanhe Temple (Chinese: 萬和宮; pinyin: Wànhé Gōng) is a temple located in Nantun District, Taichung City, Taiwan. The temple is dedicated to the sea goddess Mazu and is one of the oldest temples standing in the city.

== History ==
Zhang Guo, a Qing Dynasty government official from Quanzhou, is credited with bringing a copy of Mazu her birthplace in Meizhou Island to the current site of the temple, then known as Litoudian (犁頭店). In 1726, as Litoudian became a larger village, Zhang Guo's descendants led eleven families to build a temple for Mazu. The name "Wanhe" (lit. "ten thousand harmony") was chosen to hope for different families and clans to live peacefully alongside each other.

In 1821, an earthquake damaged the building, which was repaired through donations by the townspeople. In 1861, the temple was damaged in the Tai Chao-chuen incident, which was not repaired until 1886. In 1961, Wanhe Temple was appropriated and was to be demolished, but temple officials managed to negotiate a deal to preserve the temple; they also purchased the land in front of it to use as a plaza. On November 27, 1985, the Taichung City Government protected the building as a city monument.

== Architecture ==
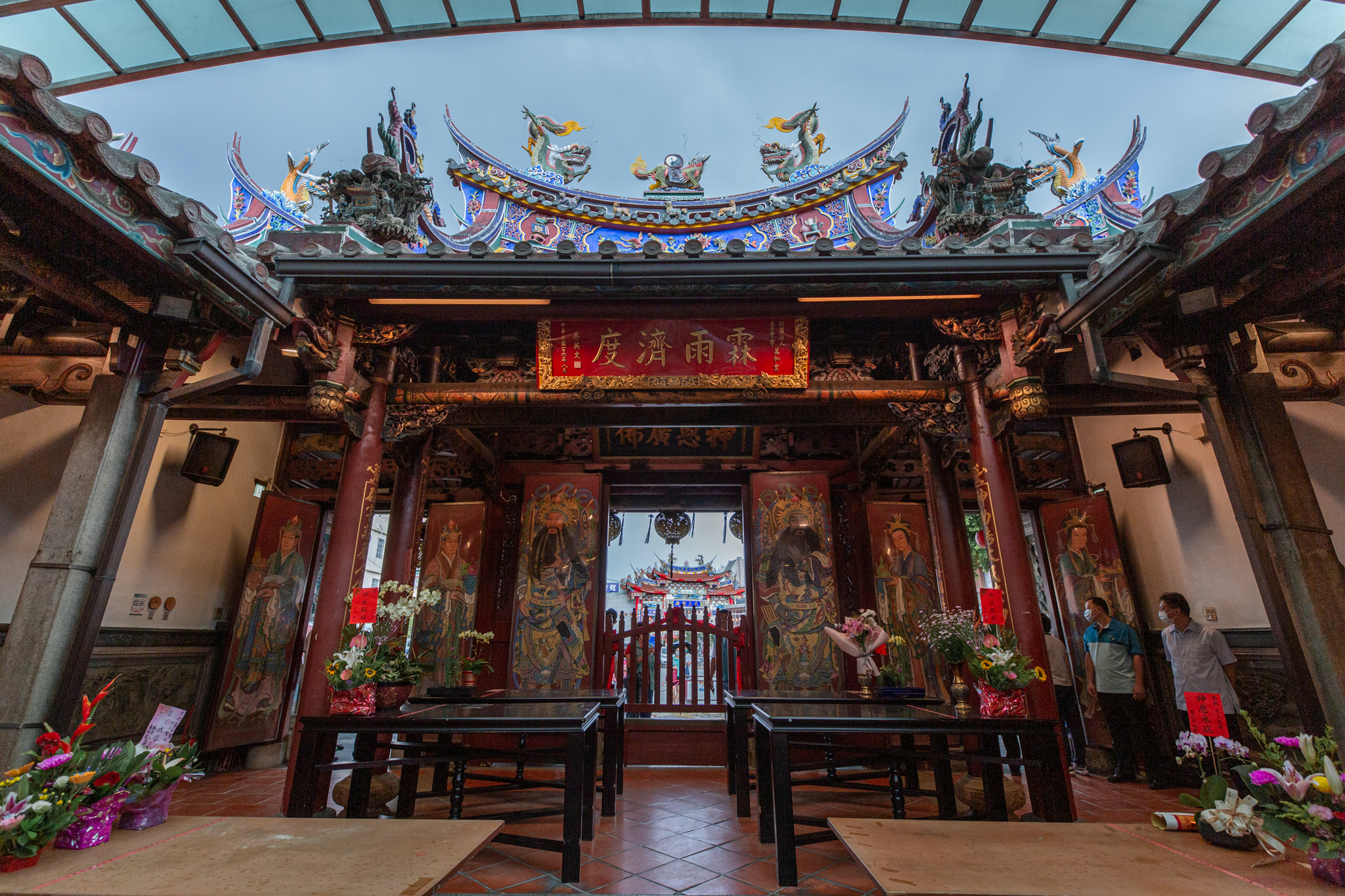
Interior of Wanhe Temple

Wanhe temple's layout has changed drastically since its establishment in the Qing Dynasty. Renovations occurred in 1821, 1861, 1913, 1953, 1961, and 1977, and none of the original building exists; the oldest surviving structures date back to the Japanese era. The temple faces east and has three central halls; on the north and south, there are two flanking halls built in 1991 that are not protected as a city monument. In the main hall, there are several statues of Mazu crafted in different time periods: Laodama (老大媽) from the temple's founding, Lao'erma (老二媽) from the Jiaqing era, Sheng'erma (聖二媽) and Shengsanma (聖三媽) from the Guangxu era, and Shenglao'erma (聖老二媽) from the post-war era. The rear hall is dedicated to Guanyin in the middle, who is flanked by Guan Yu on the left and Shennong on the right.

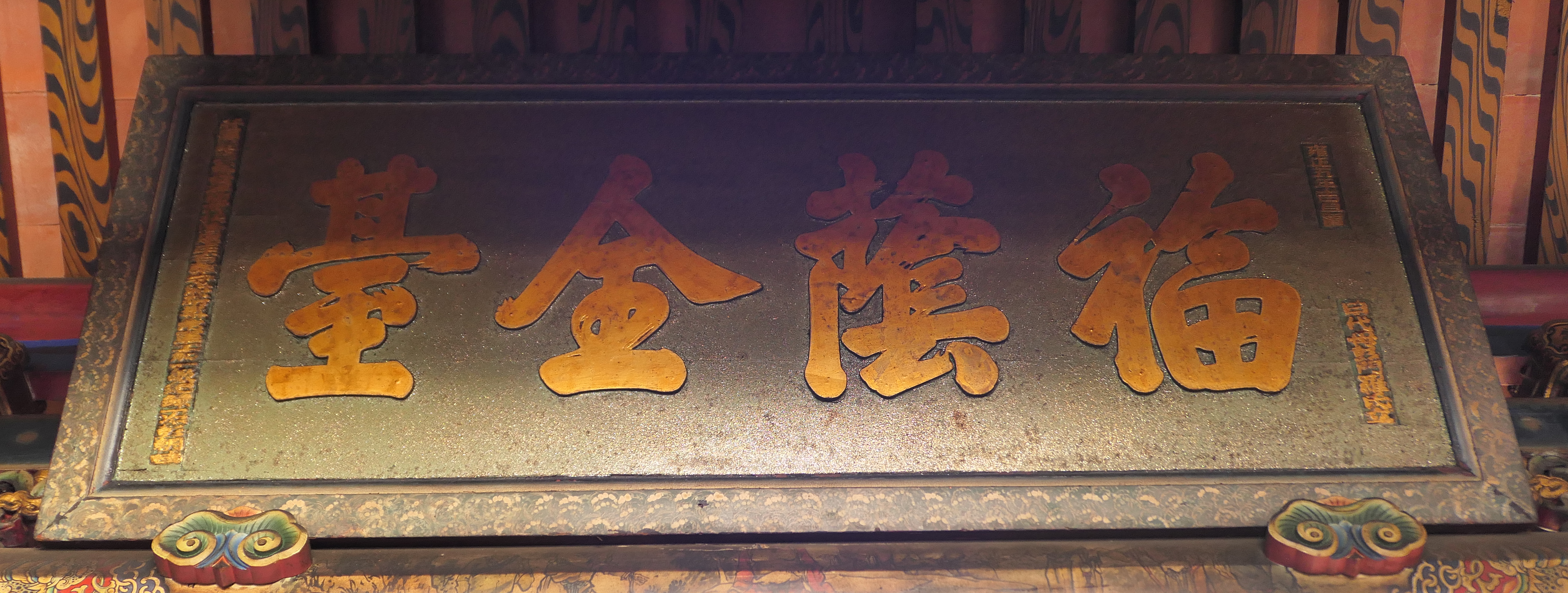
The Fúyīn Chuántái plaque, which is the oldest wooden plaque in Taichung.

Inside the temple, there are twelve historical wooden plaques (bian'e) that are protected by the city. Most notably, there is one that dates from 1732 carved with the words Fúyīn Chuántái (福蔭全臺, lit. "blessings across all of Taiwan"). The plaque was gifted to the temple by Peng Chao-gui (彭朝桂), a Qing military official, and is the oldest surviving plaque in Taichung.

== Traditions ==
=== Xitun pilgrimage ===
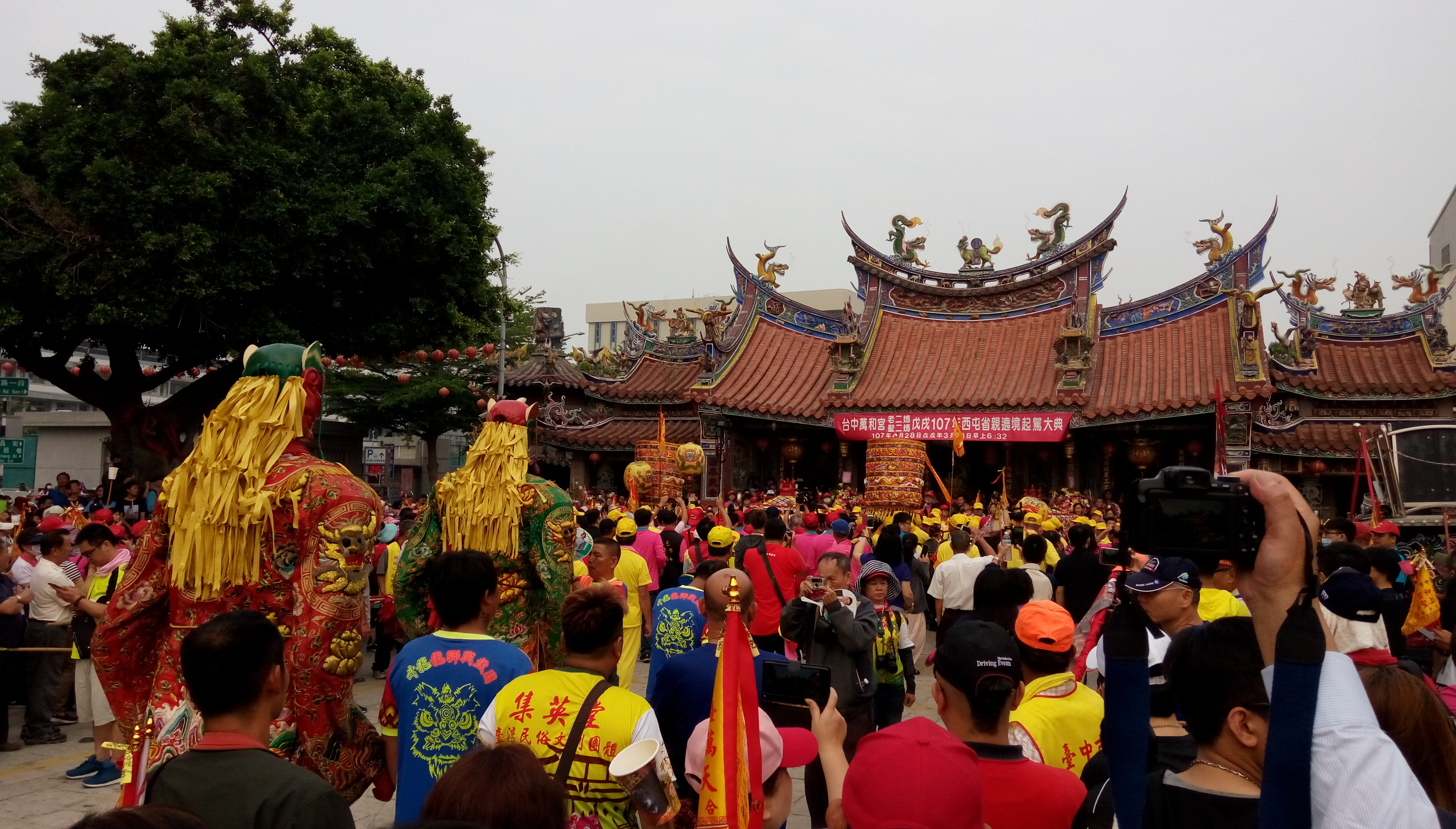
The Xitun pilgrimage procession outside Wanhe Temple in 2018.

According to legend, when the Lao'erma statue was created in 1803, a passing merchant had a vision from the spirit of a young woman. She told him that her surname was Liao and she lived in Xitun, and then asked him to tell her parents that there's money under the tree in front of their house. After the merchant delivered the message, they rushed to their daughter's bedroom, where they found that she had died. Later, they visited Wanhe Temple and found that there are tear streaks on Lao'erma's face, leading them to believe that their daughter's spirit has entered the statue. Therefore, every three years, Xitun residents embark on a pilgrimage to Wanhe Temple to take Lao'erma "home" to Qingling Temple in Xitun.

=== Zixingxi performances ===
Every third month of the Chinese Calendar, Wanhe Temple hosts Chinese opera shows for Mazu to watch in a practice known as Zixingxi (字姓戲). According to legend, in 1824, after Wanhe Temple joined Lecheng Temple on its annual eighteen village pilgrimage, the litter carrying Mazu suddenly became heavy right outside the Wanhe Temple's entrance. After poe divination, the pilgrims interpreted that Mazu wanted to be entertained by Chinese opera. Therefore, every year, each of the eleven founding families sends an opera troupe to perform in the temple plaza for the deity.
