= Chinatown, Kuala Terengganu =

Chinatown in Kuala Terengganu, Terengganu, Malaysia

Coordinates: 5.3332°N 103.1328°E

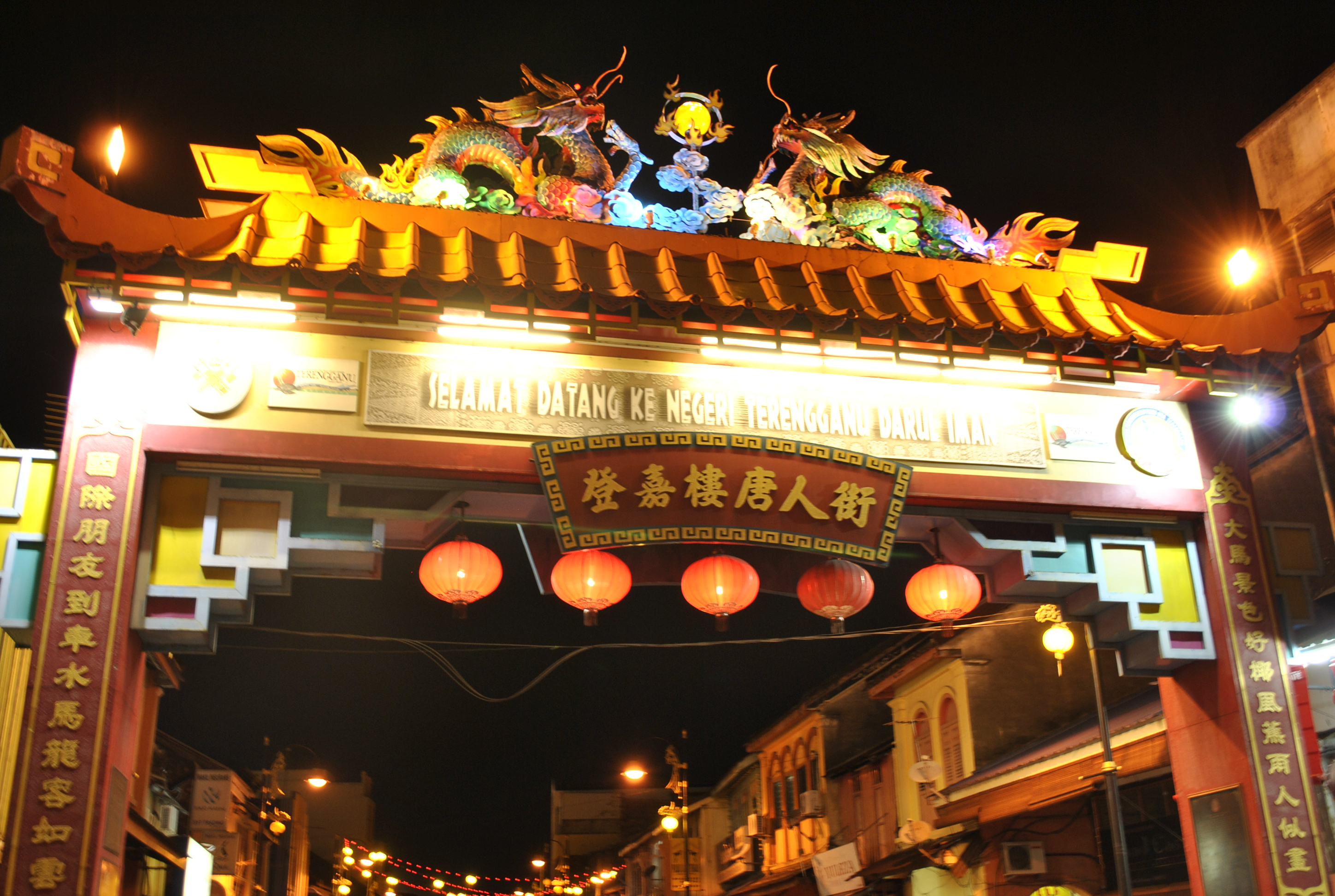
- The paifang gate of Kampung Cina on the southern end of Jalan Bandar
- Traditional Chinese: 唐人坡
- Hokkien POJ: Tn̂g-lâng Pho
Transcriptions
Standard Mandarin
- Hanyu Pinyin: Tángrén Pō
Yue: Cantonese
- Yale Romanization: Tòhngyàhn Pō
- Jyutping: Tong4jan4 Po1
Southern Min
- Hokkien POJ: Tn̂g-lâng Pho

Malay name
- Malay: Kampung Cina کامڤوڠ چينا

Kampung Cina (Jawi: کامڤوڠ چينا; Terengganuan: Kapong Cine; Chinese: 唐人坡; Pe̍h-ōe-jī: Tn̂g-lâng-pho), is a Chinatown located in Kuala Terengganu, Terengganu, Malaysia. Kampung Cina is located along Jalan Bandar (formerly known as Jalan Kampung Cina), in Kuala Terengganu city centre at the river mouth of Terengganu River that empties into the South China Sea. Kampung Cina literally means Chinese Village; it is also called Tn̂g-lâng-pho (唐人坡) or KT's Chinatown by local people. It is one of Southeast Asia's early Chinese settlements and contains stately ancestral homes, temples, townhouses, and business establishments. The town is small but has colourful shophouses along both sides of the road that carries traditional flavour.

Kuala Terengganu's Chinatown was first established by the Chinese community in the late 19th century. It was once a hub for commercial activities that helped shape Kuala Terengganu into what it is today. The Chinese built the traditionally designed shop houses according to their place of origin in China.

== History ==
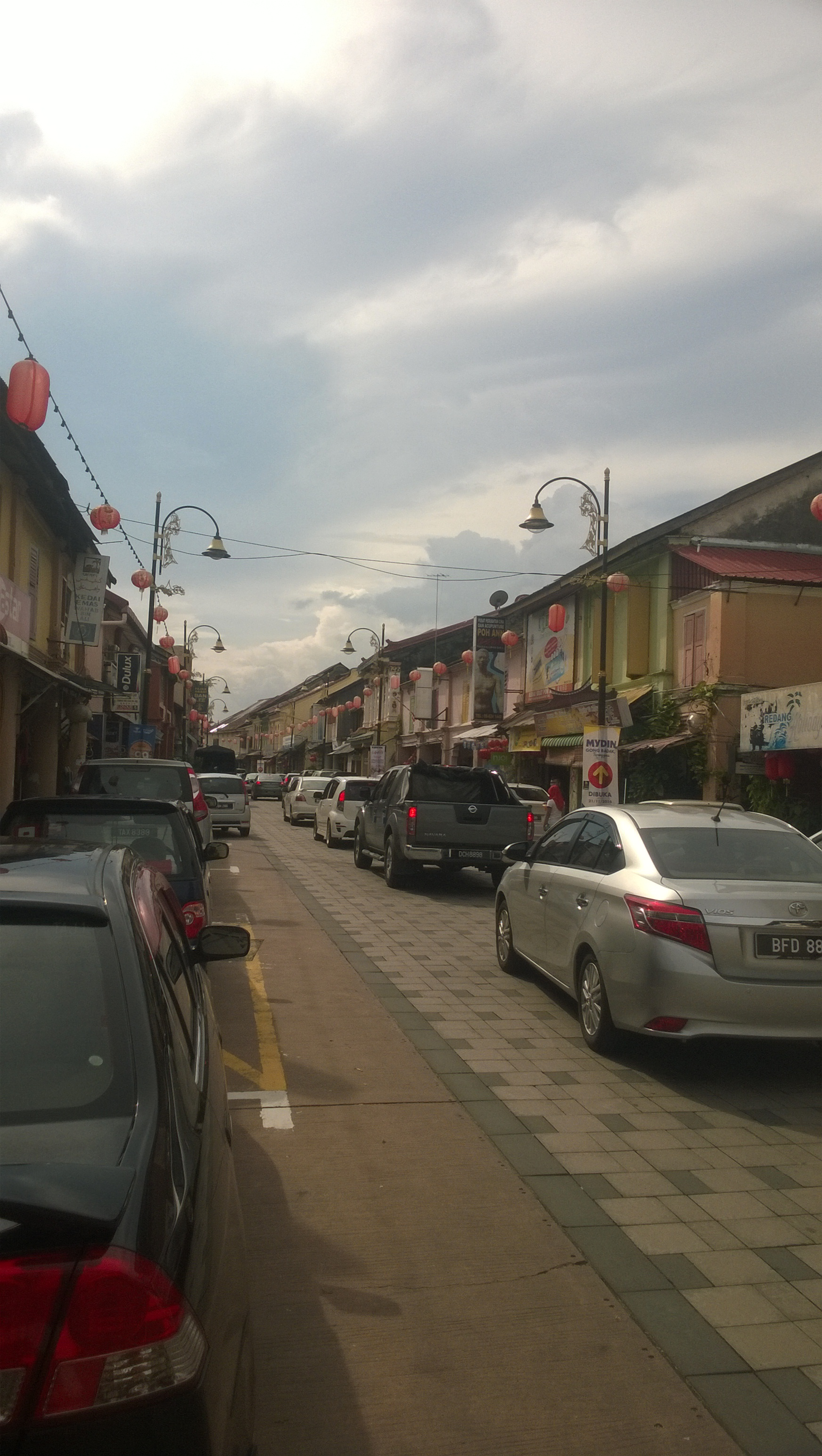
The narrow road of Kampung Cina

Kampung Cina is the main Chinese settlement in Kuala Terengganu, situated near the heart of Kuala Terengganu city centre. In 1719, the Chinese village settlement had more than 1000 house compared from its today row of pre-war Chinese shophouses of that which only dated as far as 200-year or its earlier dated that are recorded by foreigners like Alexander Hamilton and Captain Joseph Jackson who visited the Chinese settlement while in the Kuala Terengganu town during 1719, and other like J. Newbold in 1893, Munshi Abdullah in 1836, and more. The great fire in early 1880s destroyed a large part of the area and subsequently, many of the houses were rebuilt. Sunday, 18 Sep 2022 there was also a fire accident at around 8 pm.

The exact date of the founding of Kampung Cina is not clearly known as no archaeology dig was ever made, as to preserve the Kampung Cina site which is now a part of the city. Many who live here may be descended from the first Chinese who arrive and settled here at Terengganu since the 16th century. Thus many of its occupants treat their house as an ancestral home which has much history after being handed down from generation to generation. Nowadays, preservation and modification projects are carried out on many of the old buildings.

=== Evidence of the early presence of Chinese settlers in Kampung Cina ===
When Alexander Hamilton and Captain Joseph Jackson visited Kuala Terengganu in 1719–20 and 1764 respectively, the presence of Chinese settlers was noted down in their records. Alexander wrote:

Trangano ........ about one thousand houses in it, not built in regular streets, ....... The Town is above half-peopled with Chinese, who have a good trade for three to four Jonks yearly, ....... The product of the country are Pepper and Gold, which are mostly exported by the Chinese. About 300 tons are the common Export of Pepper, ........

— Alexander Hamilton.

According to the Malay scholar Munshi Abdullah, who visited Kuala Terengganu in 1836, there was a large Chinese quarter with a Kapitan Cina (Chinese leader) named Lim Eng Huat (1798–1847), who was the third Kapitan of Chinatown. He probably saw the concrete bridge being built during Sultan Mohammad's period (1837–1839) because in his second visit here, Munshi wrote about the bridge in 1838.

Kuala Terengganu was also described by Thomas John Newbold in 1839:

... the Malay town of Tringanu in 1828 was large and populous .... The Chinese are numerous, and live principally in strong brick-built houses, which now exhibit every appearance of an old and long established colony. The Chinese population of the town is estimated at 600, that of the Malays from 15,000 to 20,000.

— Thomas John Newbold, English soldier, traveller and orientalist.

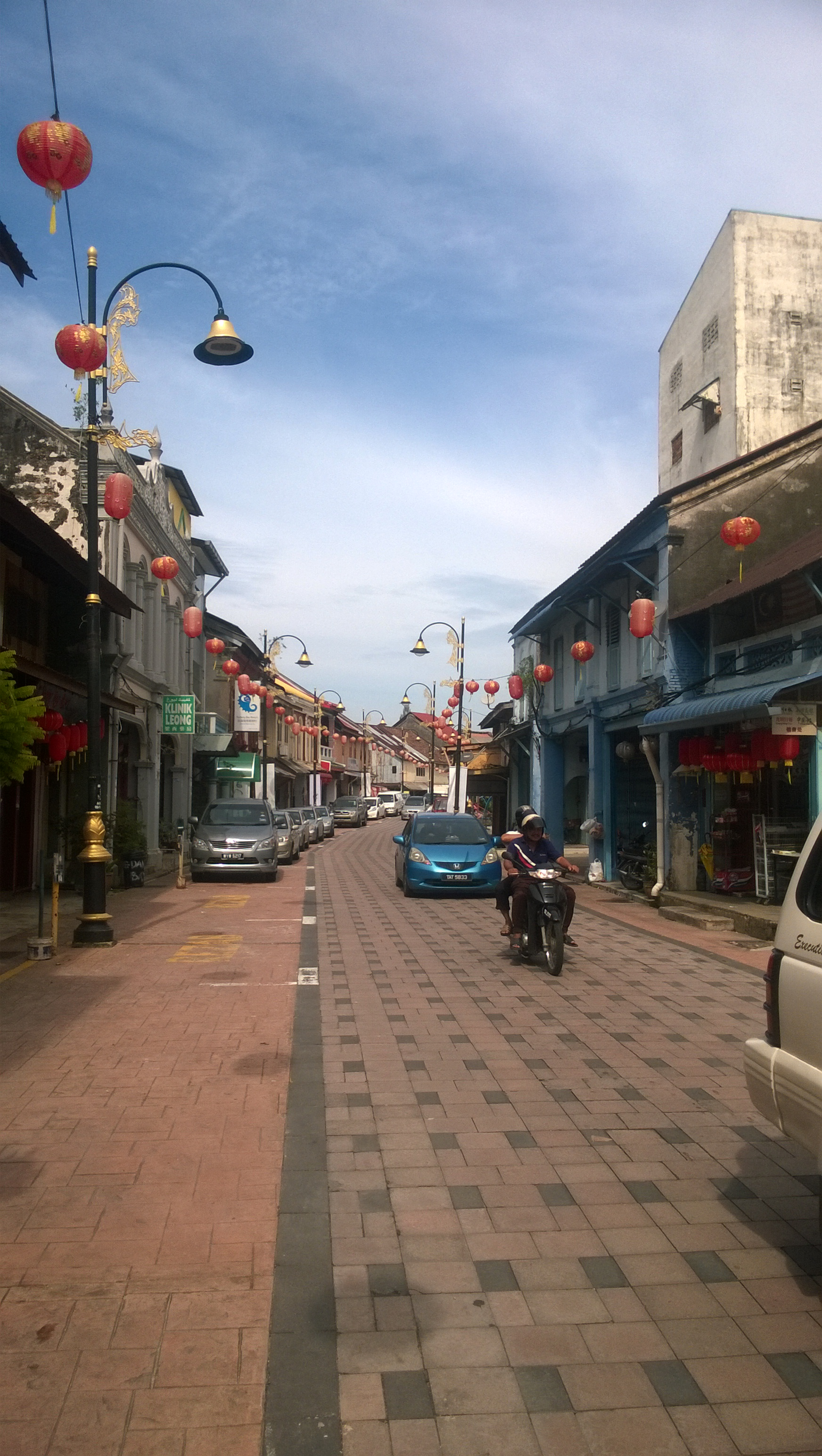
A view of Kampung Cina

Various Chinese records and annals – dated as far back as the 10th century (Song dynasty) have referred to the ports of Terengganu. Javanese records of the Kingdom of Majapahit in the 14th century also placed Kuala Terengganu on their list of trading centres. But no one really know the exact dated of the Chinese settlement in Kampung Cina. It is only certain with evidence that the Chinese settlement may started in Terengganu after Admiral Cheng Ho (Zheng He) of China return to China between 1419 AD and 1719 AD or maybe before or around the time of Alexander Hamilton and Captain Joseph Jackson who visited Kuala Terengganu in 1719–1720.

It is believed that Admiral Cheng Ho of China – the goodwill ambassador of the Ming dynasty – led a huge fleet of about 200 vessels with approximately 28,000 marine officers and crew to the shores of Kuala Terengganu in the year of 1414 AD. This is based on evidence from a map of places visited by Cheng Ho, during his fourth trip to the west.

Right after the visit of Cheng Ho, Chinese farmers from the coast of China, especially the people from Zhangzhou District of Hokkien Province, sailed to Terengganu and first settled at Bukit Datu (Big City), and along the riverbank of Nerus River. The Chinese's forefathers in Terengganu named Nerus River as Sampokang (Cheng Ho's River) and built a temple at Kampung Jeram – Sampokong Keramat Cheng Ho.

The Chinese population of Chinatown mainly did their trade in the waterfront area. These settlers were engaged in trades through concessions from the state rulers, and among their businesses included the sale and bartering of crafts such as textiles, metalwork, and woodwork from the nearby Malay communities, and commercial trades, imports, and exports of goods (such as silks, gambir, camphor, pepper, and gold) from local or foreign places.

By the mid-1800s, with the booming of the tin mining and industries, the Chinese population of Kuala Terengganu and the whole Malaya grew as new Chinese immigrants arrived here for work. Kuala Terengganu, which is located on the east coast of Peninsula Malaysia, was a stopping point for those who plied the trade route from China to South East Asia in the early days. Kampung Cina became the most densely populated area for the Chinese community in Kuala Terengganu.

== Architecture ==
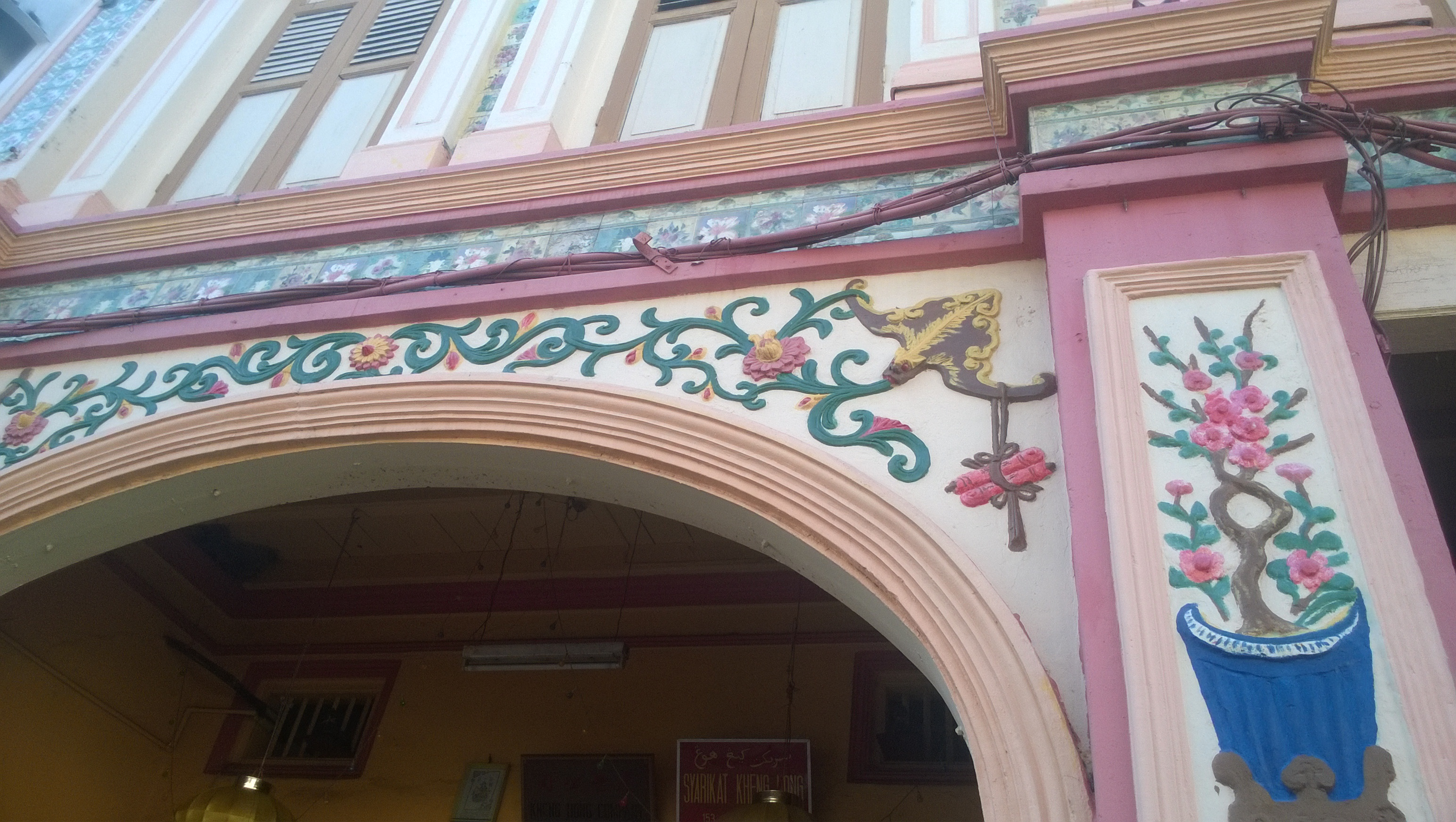
The decorative façade of one of the shophouses

Chinatown was opened about 300 years ago by the traders from Southern China and was the first area for business and trading in Kuala Terengganu, although in its current form, the oldest building (many of which are shophouses) dates back from the late 1800s. Today, there are about 270 pre-war Chinese shophouses. Many of these shophouses were originally built with brick, plaster, and timber. Currently, due to the old age of these structures, refurbishments and renovations are carried out to a number of buildings.

The early Chinese residents chose to build the shophouses near the bank of Terengganu River since the location provides a place for junks and ships to harbour. Like a typical Chinatown in other Malaysian states, the buildings incorporate various styles such as traditional Southern Chinese designs, Neoclassical, or Art Deco. The façades of these shophouses differ according to their styles. Neoclassical buildings, for instance, are rather elaborate and ornate in its decorations, while older buildings are generally bare and simple.

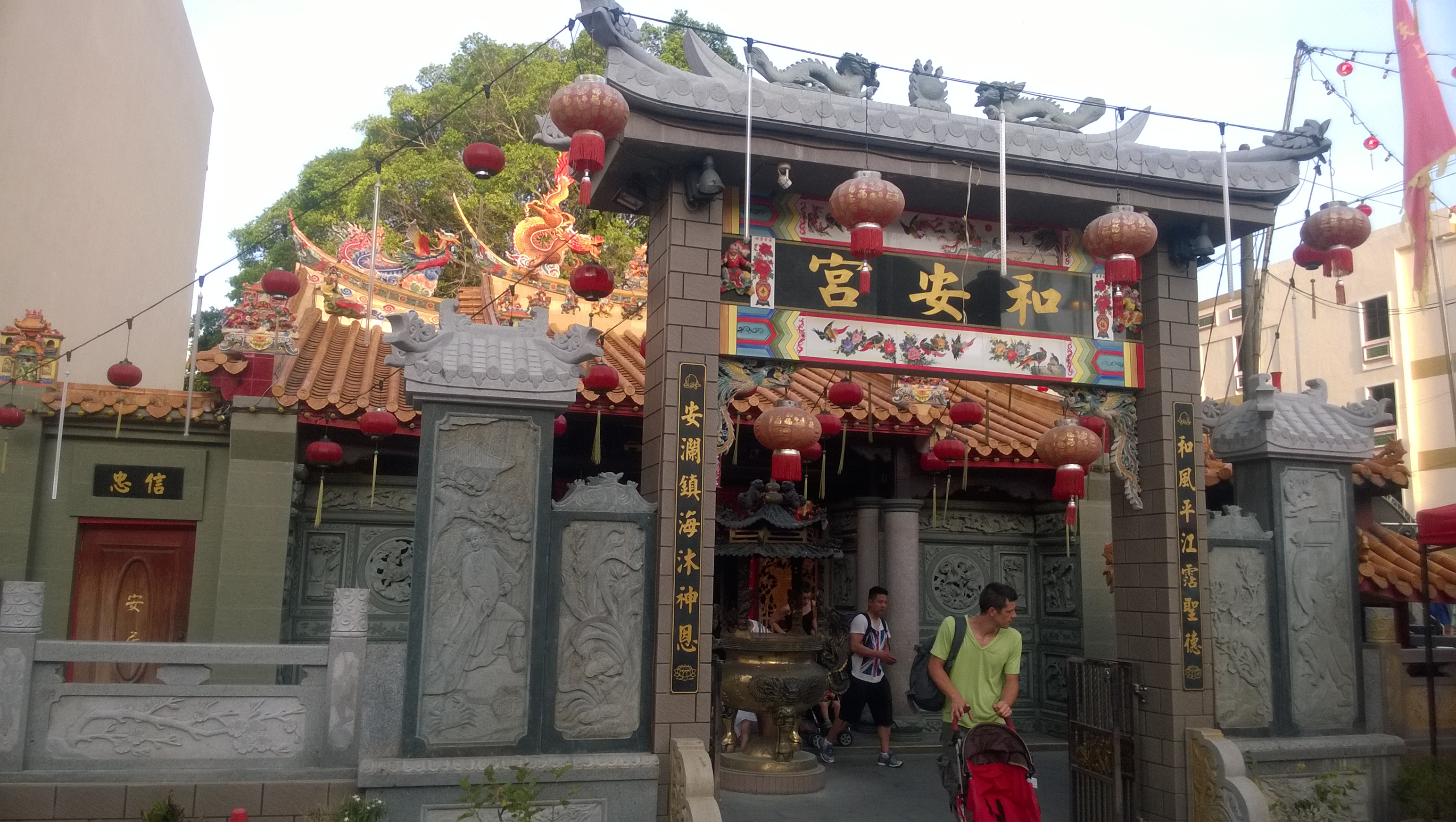
The entrance to Ho Ann Kiong Temple

Each shophouse of Chinatown is not singular building. Instead, many different shophouses are connected to one another and form one long structure. A number of back alleys separate these structures. The shophouses in Chinatown are both commercial and private structures, mostly two storeys high. Families who own business establishments (such as sundry shop, light industry, or warehouse) usually will use the ground floor for the business and trade and reside on the upper floor. The common element of many of these shophouses is the covered passageway in front of the buildings known as kaki lima or the 'five-foot-way'. The name comes from the original prescribed width of the passageway, which is five feet, although later regulations prescribed a width of seven and a half feet.

== Culture ==
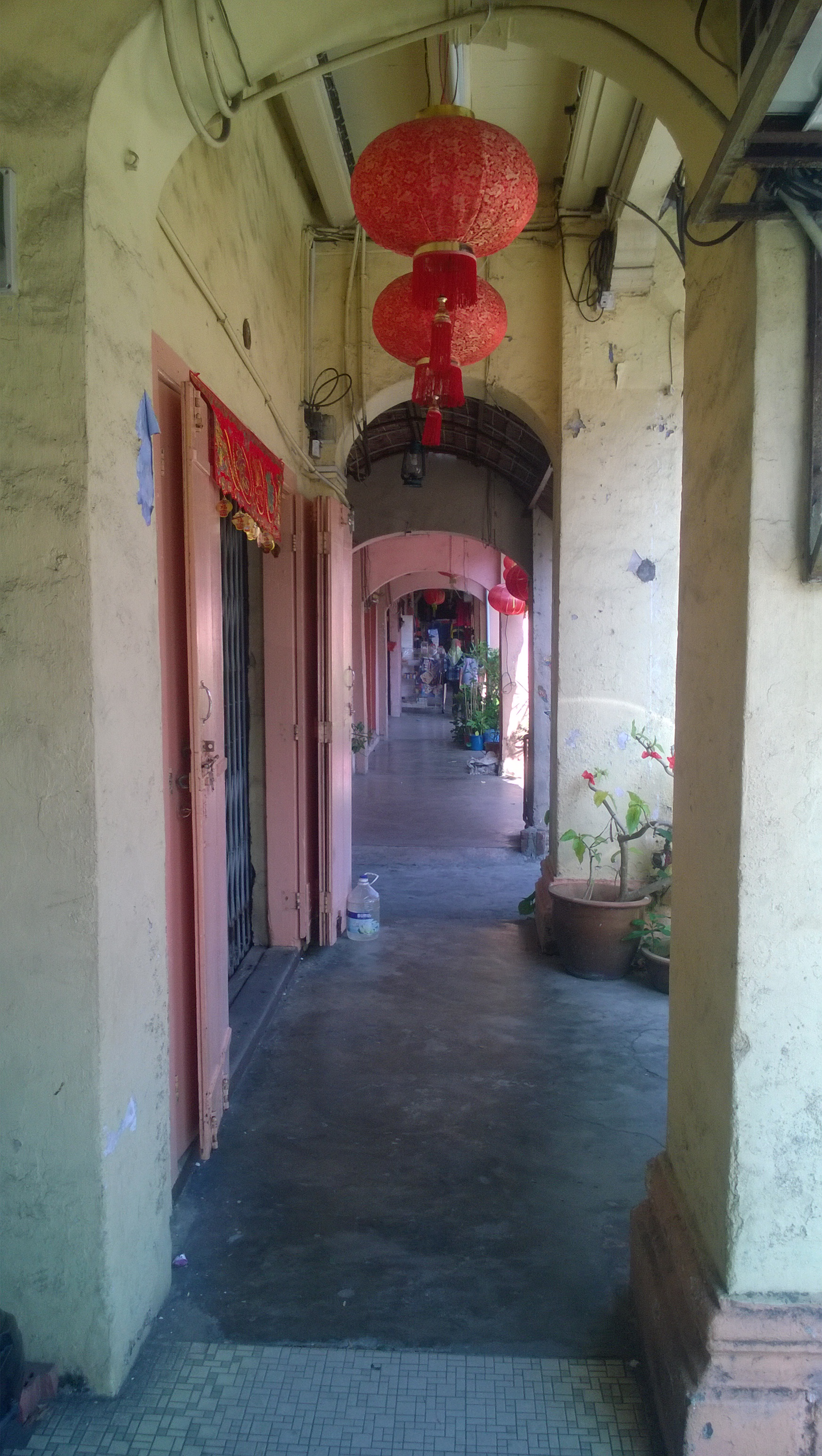
The 'kaki lima' or five-foot way in Chinatown, Kuala Terengganu. This is a typical feature of Malaysian Chinatowns.

The culture in Chinatown has been one that is an admixture of the Malay and Chinese traditions and lifestyles. Chinese traditions and customs can be found everywhere in this place and Chinese new year is celebrated widely by the Chinese residents. The influence of local Malay culture in Terengganu also gave rise to the small Peranakan community locally known as Mek and Awang. This community is quite similar to their counterparts in Penang and Malacca known as Baba and Nyonya, but still retains its own uniqueness and differences. Mek and Awang community is centred in two main places, Chinatown, and Kampung Tiruk, a village about 14 km from Kuala Terengganu.

Similar to the Baba and Nyonya in Penang and Malacca, the traditional costume of the Terengganuan Peranakan women is a special type of kebaya known as kebaya potong kot. Ornamental broidery is typical of this kebaya.

As the name implies, the residents and business traders of Chinatown are mostly Chinese although nowadays, there are other Malay or Indian traders. Small grocery shops, butcher shops, hardware shops, kopitiams (traditional Chinese coffee shops), cafes, restaurants and so on can be found there. Many of the businesses have been operating here for decades and are handed down to the new generations of traders.

=== Cuisine ===
Kampung Cina is also known for its local delicacies such as roti paung, a special local bread, durian cake, pulut dipa and the white keropok lekor, which is made of wolf herring or ikan parang. Many local Chinese dishes, along with other Malay and Indian fares, can be found in the restaurants and food courts located here. As per usual with many other cities in Malaysia, modern restaurants and cafes are also available.

The Chinese dishes (especially the Peranakan dishes) are influenced by the local East Coast culture. Among the influence is the usage of budu), a fish sauce made from anchovies. Local Chinese or Peranakan dishes that can be found here include ayam pachok, akok, rojak ceranang, roti paung dan pulut lepa. The kopitiams, cafes and restaurants that are available here offer local delicacies, mostly Chinese, but also Malay and Indian food.

== Attractions ==
In the year 2004, the government declared that Kampung Cina's various historical structures and area were to be gazetted as a heritage site of Terengganu. As a significant area of the city's Chinese community, it is home to two Chinese temples, Ho Ann Kiong and Tien Hou Kong, which were built in 1801 and 1896, respectively. Ho Ann Kiong contains a statue of the goddess of the sea, Mazu. Unfortunately, a fire broke out that ultimately destroyed 60% of the temple. A restoration was carried out and now Ho Ann Kiong functions again. Another landmark is the 19th-century Low Tiey water well, erected in 1875. It was believed to have been excavated and constructed in 1875 by Low Tiey Lim Keng Hoon (1820–1882) as a public service to the community. It was built with two separate bathing chambers for men and women with a six-metre high wall. After years and years, it still supplies clean water to Chinatown's residents.

Many of the buildings here have undergone restoration or beautification programmes to make them more appealing, but without destroying the heritage value. While the shophouses still retain their distinctive characteristics, they are now brighter and livelier. One can still see repair works being carried out on several shophouses. Murals can be found in many sections of the area. The recent attractions in Kampung Cina are its back alleys, many of which are transformed into thematic lanes. For example, Turtle Alley, the narrowest back lane, has information related to various turtles and turtle-themed wall and floor mosaics. Tauke Wee Seng Hee Cultural Lane is another such thematic lane. This alley showcases an old, colonial-era telephone booth and a classic cast iron post box (still in use) painted in bright red. The walls also displays a collection of old signs from shops in Chinatown and several Han dynasty-era poems. These lanes have become tourist and photography spots.

== Image gallery ==
Gallery of street view images of Chinatown, Kuala Terengganu

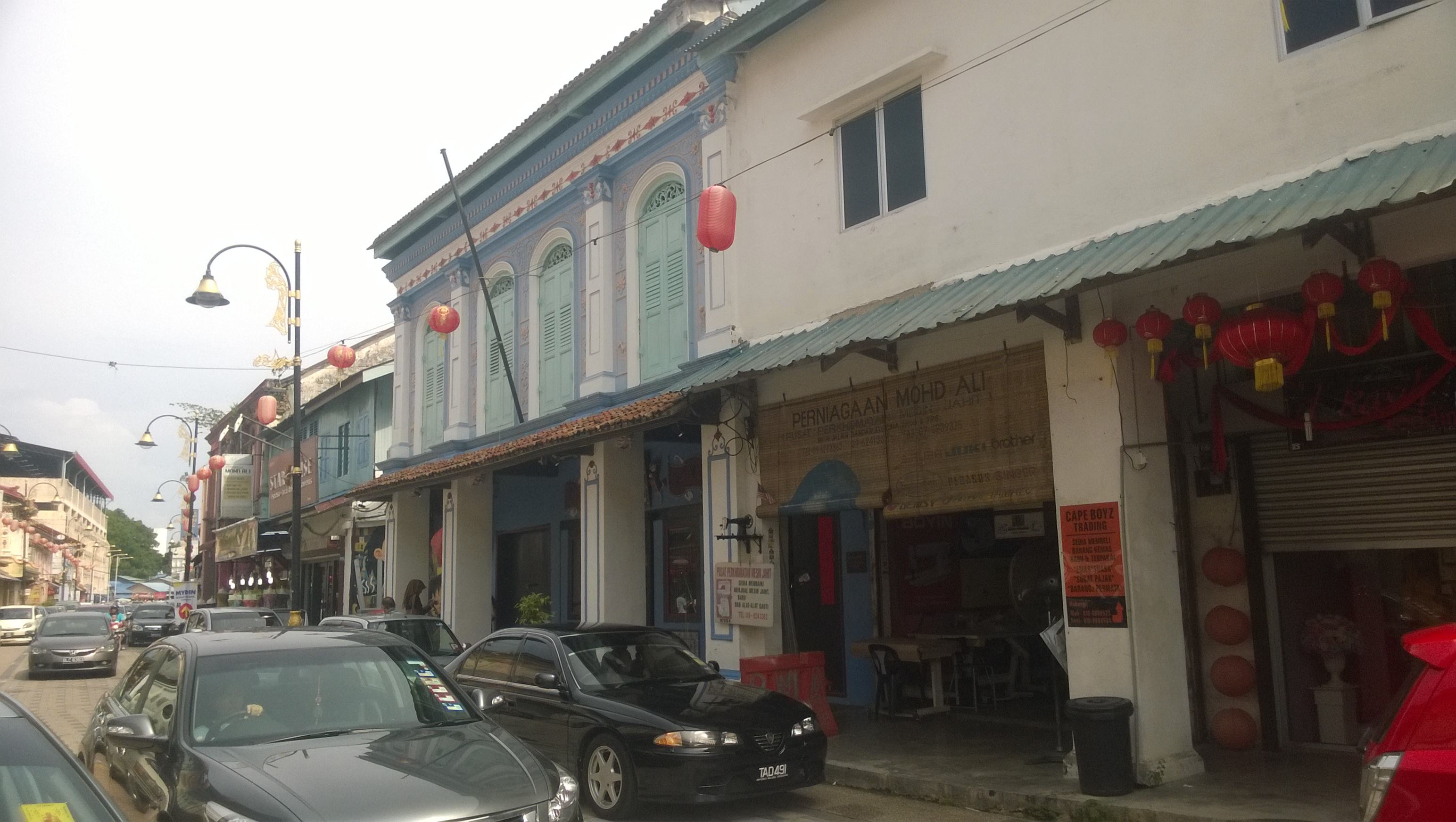
The shophouses near Pasar Besar Kedai Payang

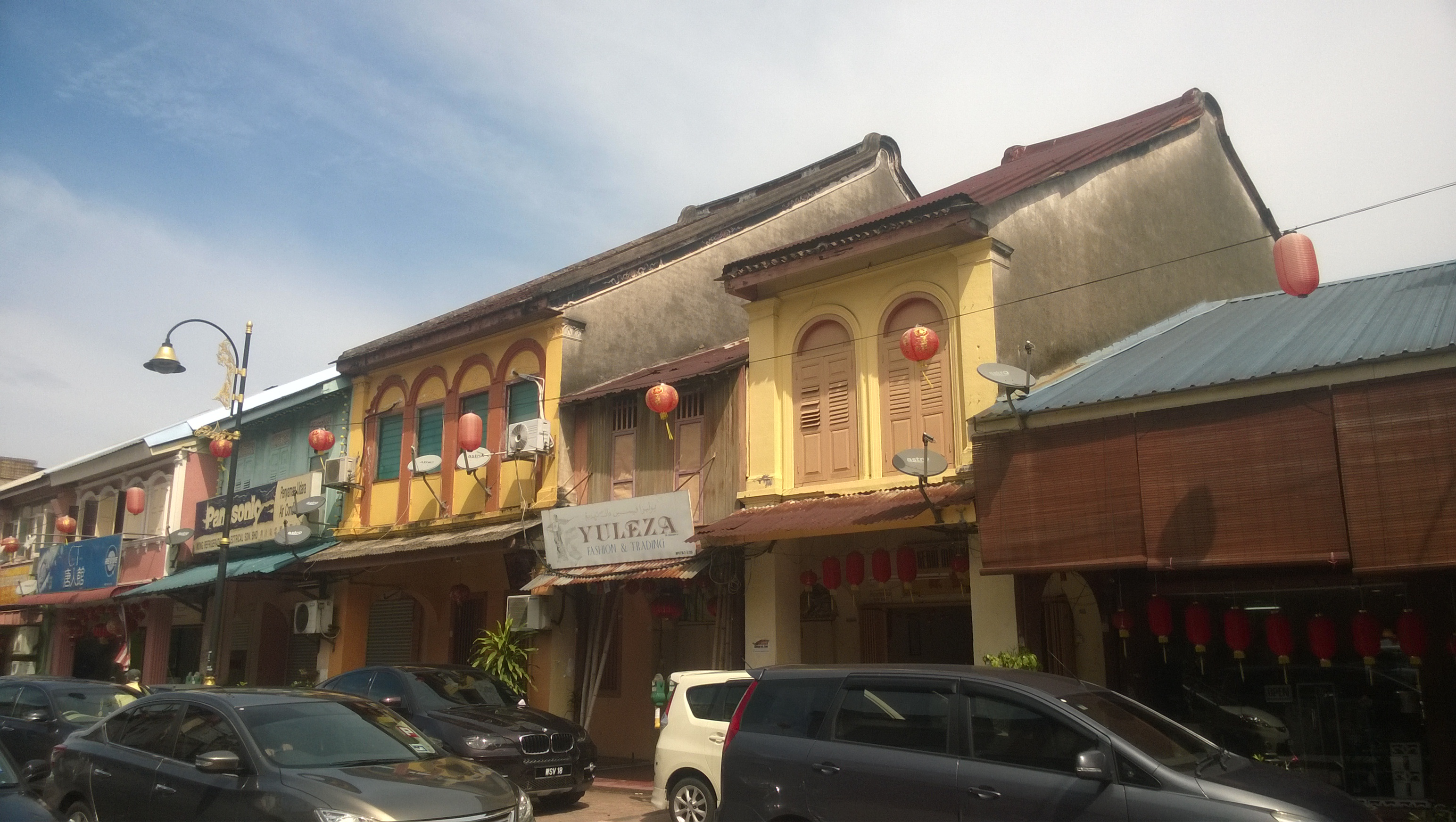
The row of shophouses

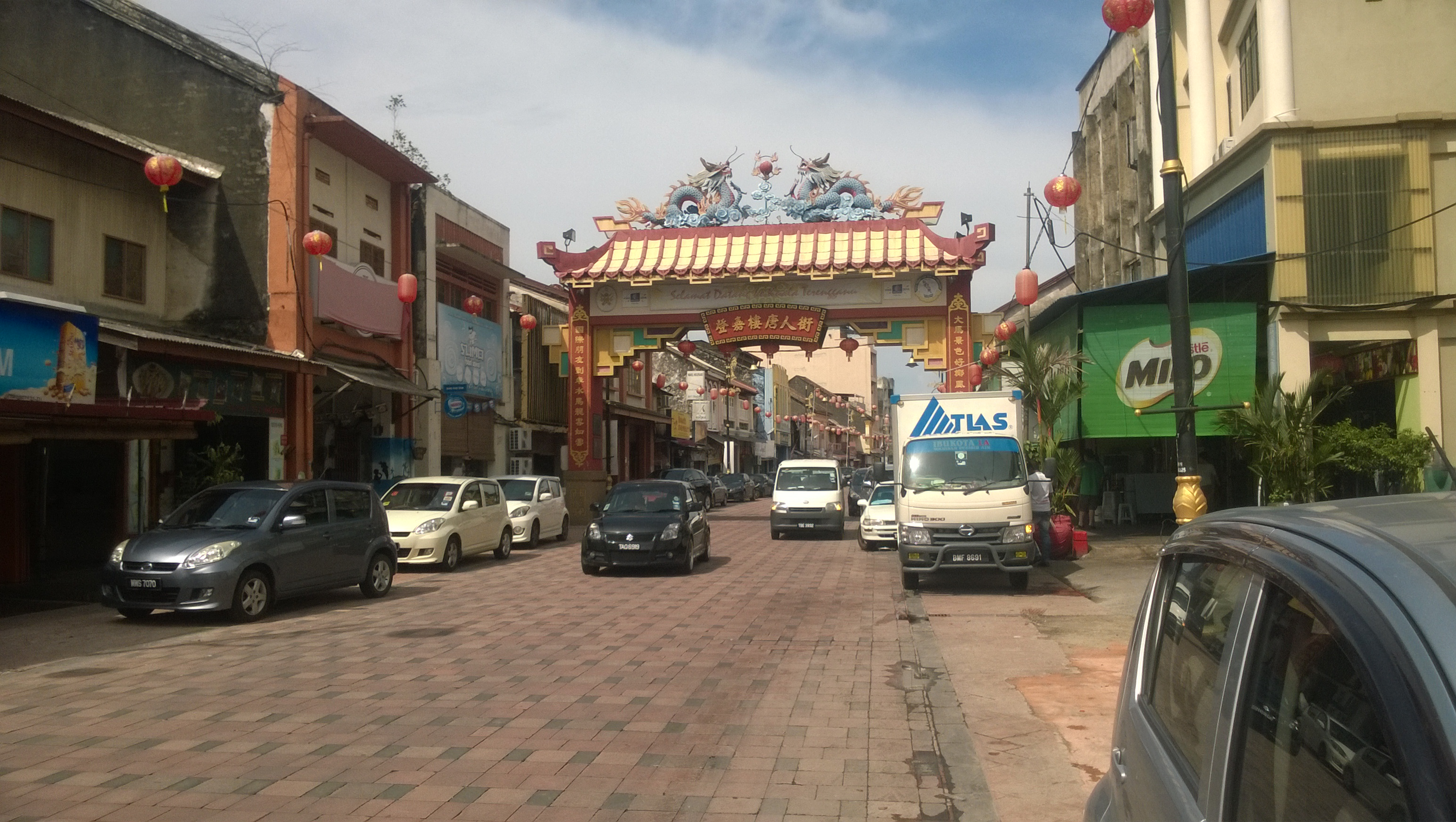
The gate of Chinatown

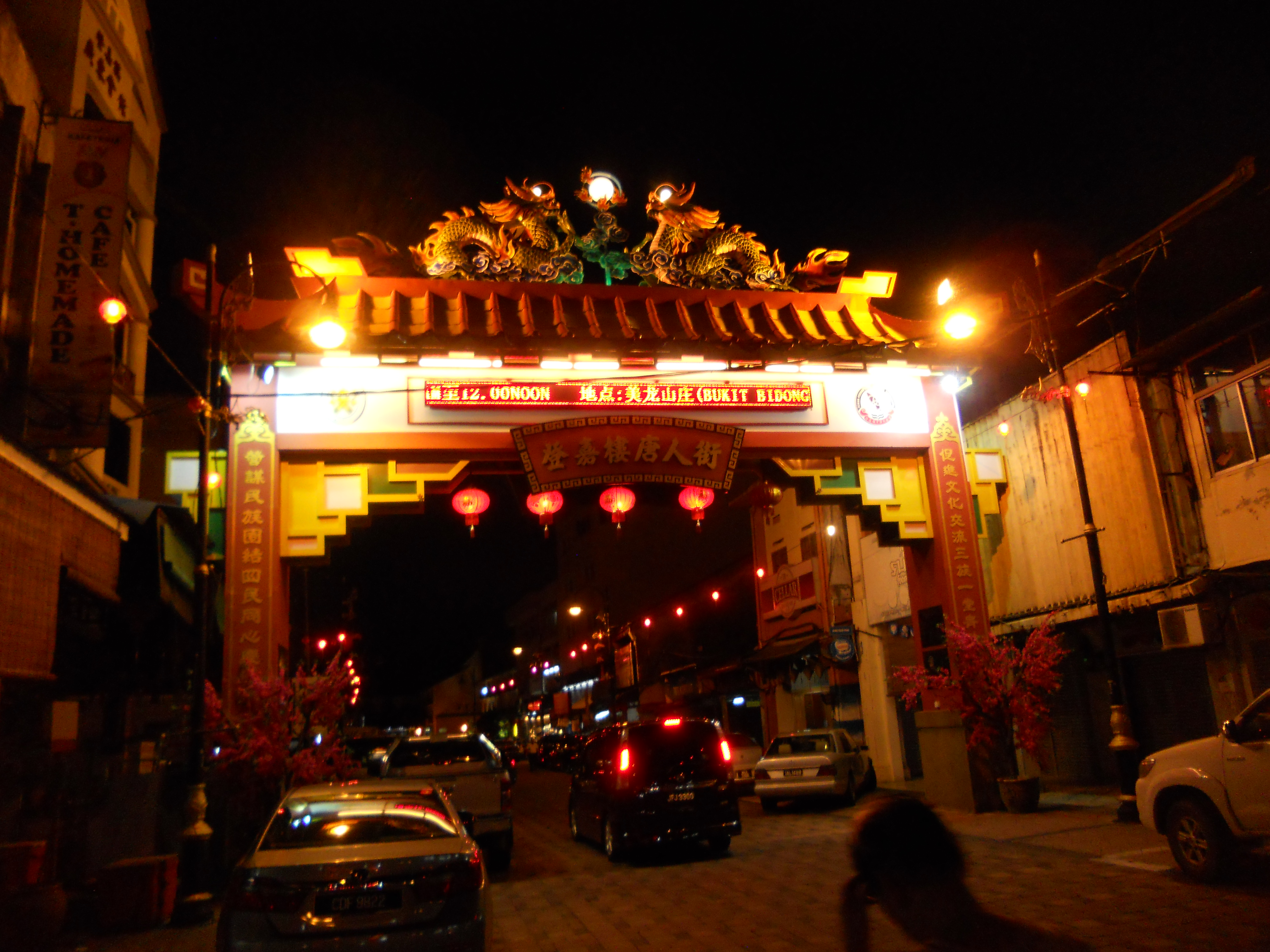
The gate of Chinatown at night
