= Kampung Tok'kong =

Kampung Tok'kong (Chinese: 赤腳村) is a village in Ketereh constituency, Kelantan, Malaysia. It is about 24 km south of Kota Bharu. "Tokong" is the Malay word for "Chinese temple."

== Name ==
Kampung Tok'kong was once known as Chiakka ("Barefoot"). This likely originated before the paving of the local roads.

== Seng Choon Kiong ==
Kampung Tok'kong is known for Seng Choon Kiong (聖春宫), a temple to the Chinese sea goddess Tian Shang Sheng Mu (天上聖母), also known as Mazu, the deified form of the medieval Fujianese girl Lin Moniang. The temple is approximately 300 years old and is a site of pilgrimage for worshippers of Mazu in Malaysia. Lin Moniang's birth is commemorated each year on the 23rd day of the third month of the Chinese lunar calendar. The temple has an association which will tour around Kelantan to perform the lion dance during the Chinese New Year period. It also conducts rituals to dispel evil spirits and bad luck.
