= Tian Hou Gong Temple =

Chinese temple in Kuala Terengganu, Terengganu, Malaysia

- Malay: Tokong Tian Hou Gong; Chinese: 天后宮
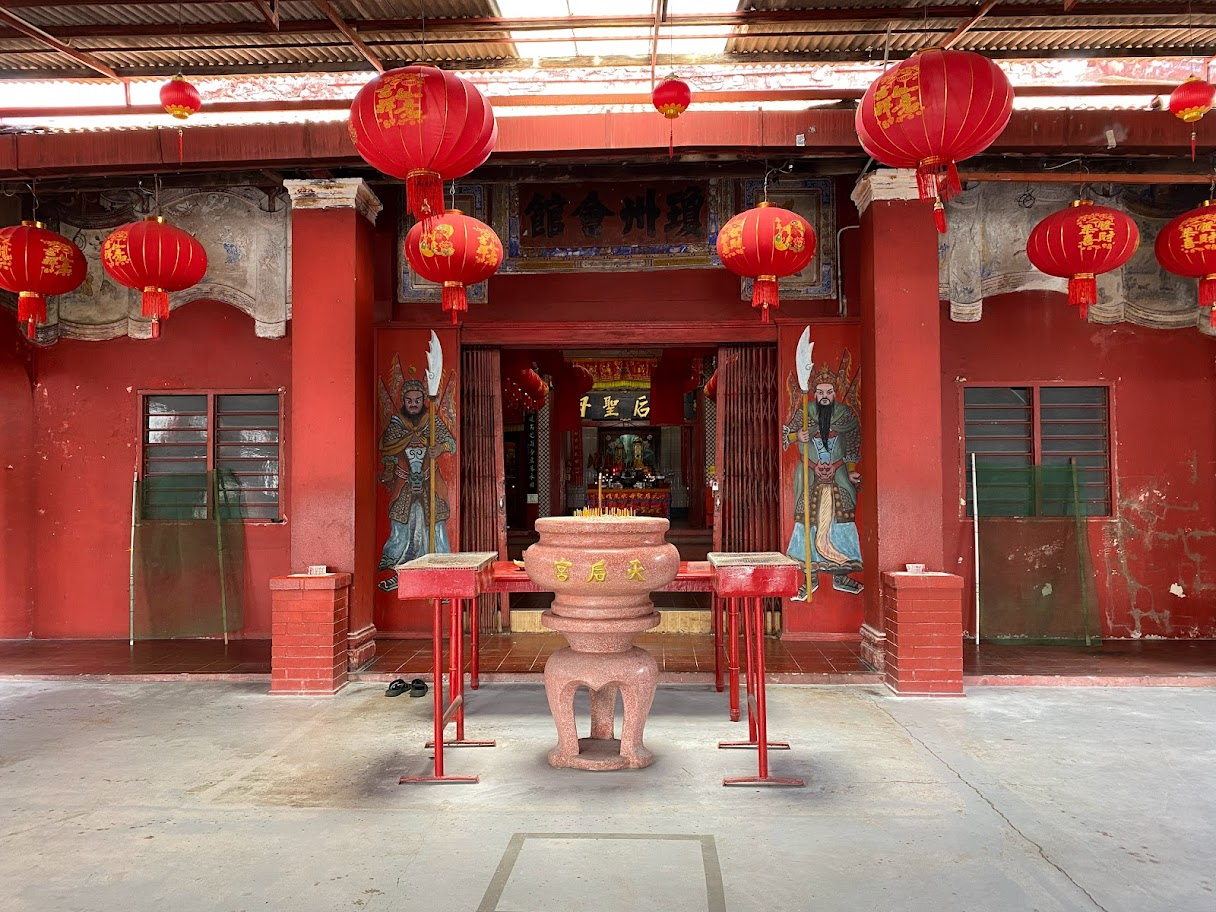
- The entrance of the temple.

Religion
- Affiliation: Taoism
- District: Kuala Terengganu District

Location
- Location: Kuala Terengganu
- State: Terengganu
- Country: Malaysia
- Geographic coordinates: 5°19′48.67″N 103°7′57.609″E

Architecture
- Type: Chinese temple
- Date established: 1896

Tian Hou Gong Temple
- Traditional Chinese: 天后宮
- Simplified Chinese: 天后宫
Transcriptions
Standard Mandarin
- Hanyu Pinyin: Tiān Hòu Gōng
- Wade–Giles: Tʻien¹ Hou⁴ Kung¹
Southern Min
- Hokkien POJ: Thian Hō͘ Kiong

Tian Hou Gong Temple (Malay: Tokong Tian Hou; Chinese: 天后宮), also called as Tian Hou, Tien Hou Kong or Heavenly Empress Temple, is a Chinese temple situated in Jalan Balik Bukit in the north of the Chinatown of Kuala Terengganu, Terengganu, Malaysia.

== History ==
The temple are established by early Hainanese settlers in a small structure to worship their sea deity of Shui Wei Sheng Niang which is said found in a junk which was shipwrecked in Terengganu. Apart from another temple in the Chinese settlement, the temple served as a focal point for their fishermen and their families who lived along the banks of the Terengganu River. It also become forerunner of the Hainanese Association (Qiongzhou Huiguan). The temple building was then constructed in 1895 for both devotees and the association. Most of its structure were constructed with materials brought in from China with the building are completed the following year.

In 2003, the temple land was nearly acquire by the state government of Terengganu under the administration of Pan-Malaysian Islamic Party (PAS) for waterfront beautification project but was reversed following huge protest from the local residents.

== Features ==
The temple feature three altars in its main hall with two ancestral tablets dedicated to wandering souls and 108 brave villagers who lost their lives during a war since time immemorial. The statues of Mazu and Shui Wei Sheng Niang occupies the central altar while in the right is devoted to Guan Yu and Fude Zhengshen.
