= Tai Chao-chuen incident =

Tai Chao-chuen Incident
Date	1862–1865
Location	Taiwan, Qing China
Result	Qing dynasty victory

Belligerents
Qing dynasty	Tai Chao-chuen

The Tai Chao-chuen Incident (Chinese: 戴潮春事件) was one of the three major rebellions in Taiwan during the rule of the Qing dynasty. The rebellion lasted from 1862 to about 1865. The incident was caused by the suppression of the Tiandihui by the Qing government, and affected central Taiwan, spreading as far north as Dajia and as far south as Chiayi. Although the rebellion was led by Tai Chao-chuen (Chinese: 戴潮春; Taiwanese: Tè Tiâu-tshun), many rich and powerful people from all over Taiwan, like Lin Ri-cheng and Hung Tsung, were also involved.

At this time, the Qing dynasty was facing the Taiping Rebellion and therefore had little military force to spare to put down rebellion in Taiwan. In addition, many powerful local leaders participated in the rebellion, causing the Qing to initially rely on the militia of the Wufeng Lin and other clans. The rebellion was not brought under control until after the Qing had dispatched Ding Yuejian and Lin Wencha to suppress it in 1863, and did not end until 1865.

Once the Qing had succeeded, the Lin clan of Wufeng emerged as the most powerful in central Taiwan. This would eventually lead to conflicts between the clan and the Kuomintang government after the end of Japanese rule.

== Origin ==
In 1860, the Taiping Rebellion troops invaded Zhejiang Province. The then Governor of Fujian and Zhejiang, Fucha Qingduan, petitioned the imperial court to recruit Taiwanese braves to assist in suppressing the bandits. With the court's approval, in the winter of 1861, 3,000 Taiwanese braves were recruited to aid Zhejiang. Approximately two thousand of these braves were recruited from the Wufeng Shanggu area by Lin Wenchai and Lin Wenming. Other military leaders holding positions like Commander of Taiwan, and Assistant Commander of the Northern Route of Taiwan such as Zeng Yuming and Zeng Yuanfu, were also transferred to Zhejiang and Fujian to combat during the same period, shifting the military forces of central Taiwan.

Tai Chao-chuen, the leader of the Tai Chao-chuen Incident, was originally from Longxi, Zhangzhou. From his grandfather Dai Shenbao, not only was a landlord in the Sizhangli area of Changhua County with a wealthy family background, but he also had good relations with the government, traditionally holding the position of "Draft Scribe" in the Northern Route Assistant Commander's office. Tai Chao-chuen's position as a "Draft Scribe", also known as "Character Scribe", involved clerical work in the military as much military personnel was illiterate, requiring a scribe to assist with records, and manage the transfer of troops, funds, and provisions.

Tai Chao-chuen's elder brother, Tai Wan-guei, discontent with their family's land rent being infringed upon by the people of Azawu (Lin Wenchai's family), collaborated with Zhang Shui, to organize the "Baguahui". At that time, bandits and thieves roamed everywhere, and it was agreed among villages to come to each other's aid in times of trouble; Tai Chao-chuen, to avoid further trouble, did not involve himself in the affairs of the Baguahui. According to "Dai Case Brief", similar local mutual defense organizations, composed of people from Quanzhou, such as the "Tong'an Liaison Twelve Villages", were also prevalent, led by the chief minister Chen Qing'an, based around today's Fuxing Township and Puyan Township.

In 1861, when the former Deputy Commander of the Northern Route, Zeng Yuming, was promoted to Commander of Fujian Funing, Xia Ruxian filled the vacancy. Tai Chao-chuen was still serving as a Draft Scribe. That winter, during a tour by the Magistrate of Changhua, Gao Tingjing, Tai Chao-chuen arrested a group of hooligans and presented them to Gao, displeasing Xia Ruxian. Xia accused Dai of disloyalty and demanded bribes. Dai refused and was forced to resign. After returning to his hometown of Sizhangli, with his elder brother Dai Wanguai deceased, Tai Chao-chuen took over the management of the "Training Groups" under the guise of training militias, subsequently taking over the Baguahui's operations and reorganizing it into the "Tiandihui". Due to the prevailing poor security, local order was often maintained by these training groups, attracting wealthy families to join, and leading to a significant increase in the Tiandihui membership. From the original 300 members of his family's private militia, by 1862, the number of members recorded in the society's register exceeded ten thousand.

== Impact ==
Following the battle, most of the major landlords and gentry of central Taiwan were either killed or severely wounded, and their properties were confiscated by the Qing government under the name of "rebel properties", some of which were transferred to the Wufeng Lin family as compensation for the military expenses they had covered. Additionally, because of their role in quelling the uprising, the Wufeng Lin family was granted the exclusive right to purchase camphor throughout Fujian Province (which included Taiwan at the time). As Lin Wenming strategized attacks on various villages and later inventoried "rebel properties" and collected "punitive donations" (fines and redemption money from the families of the accused), he amassed significant wealth and land, propelling the Lin family to become one of the five major families in Taiwan. However, this incident also planted seeds of opposition between the Lin family and the government and exacerbated hostilities with neighbouring clans, leading to Lin Wenming's eventual assassination and a temporary decline of the Lin family's fortunes.

From another perspective, Tai Chao-chuen's regime during the Qing rule period in Taiwan was seen as the most politically conscious rebel force. During the incident, Tai Chao-chuen created nursery rhymes, forged talismans, and personally engaged in farming, emulating the behaviour of an emperor and the concept of celestial.

== See also ==
- Tiandihui
- Taiwan under Qing Dynasty rule
