= List of canyons =

This list of canyons and gorges includes both land and submarine canyons with the land canyons being sorted by continent and then by country.

== Africa ==
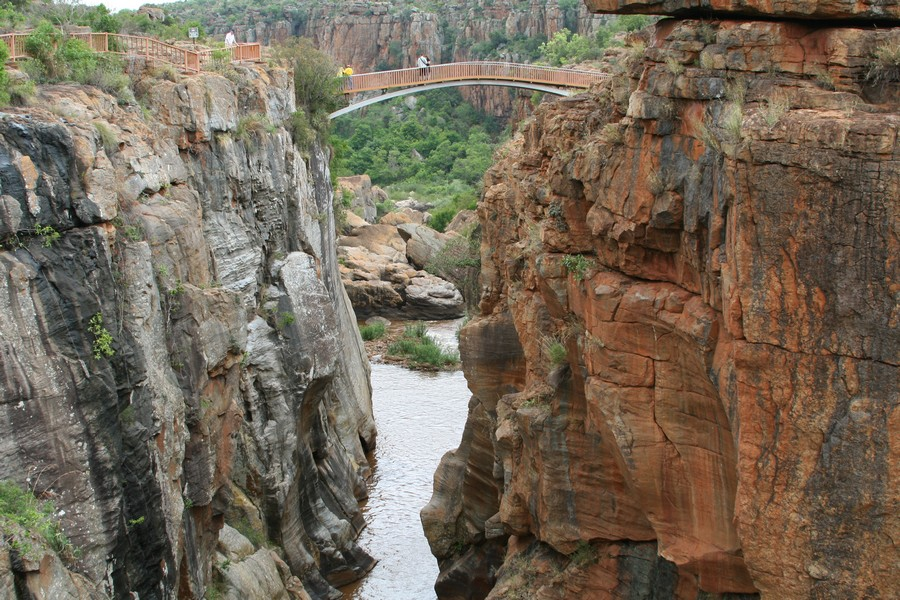
Blyde River Canyon, South Africa

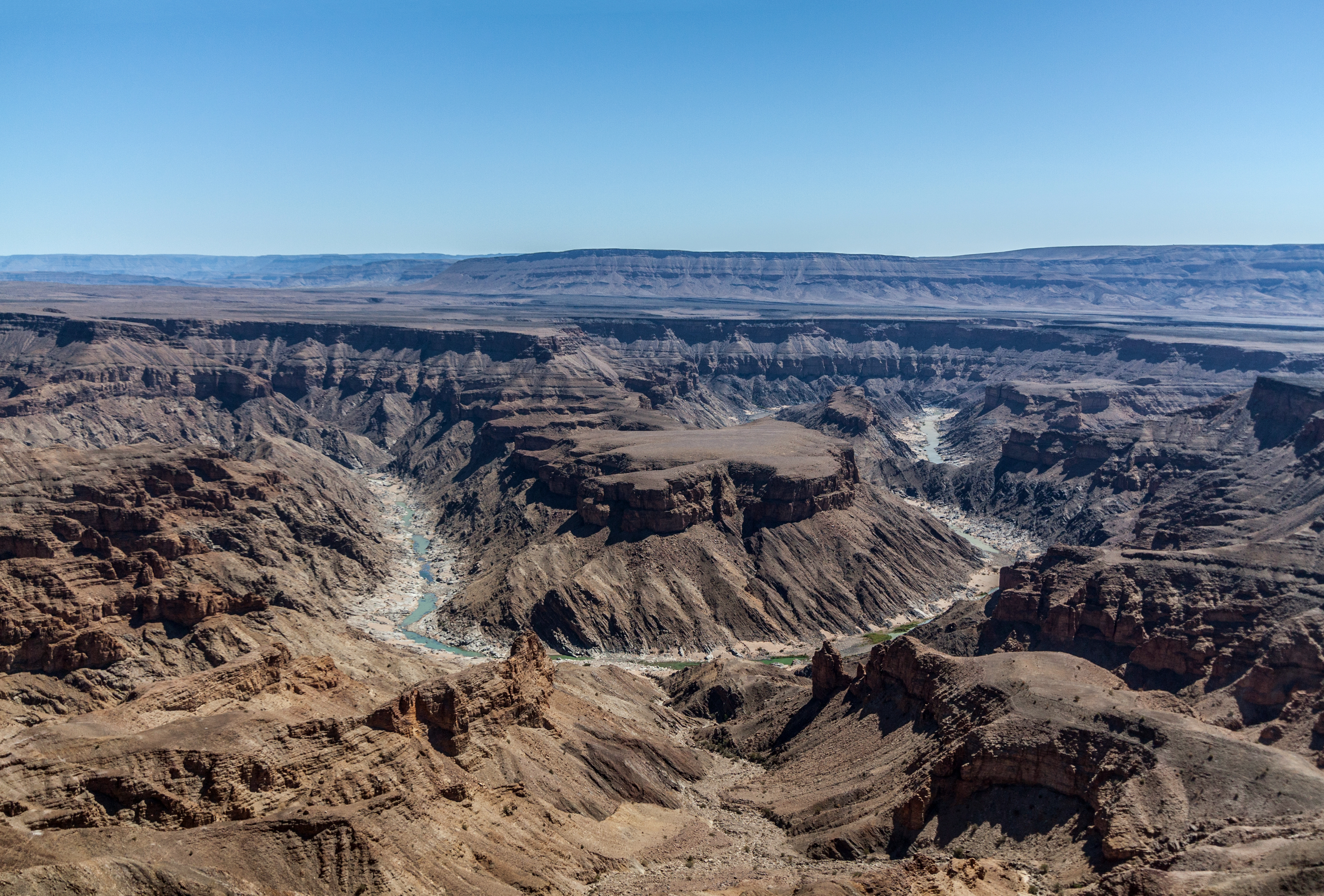
Fish River Canyon, Namibia

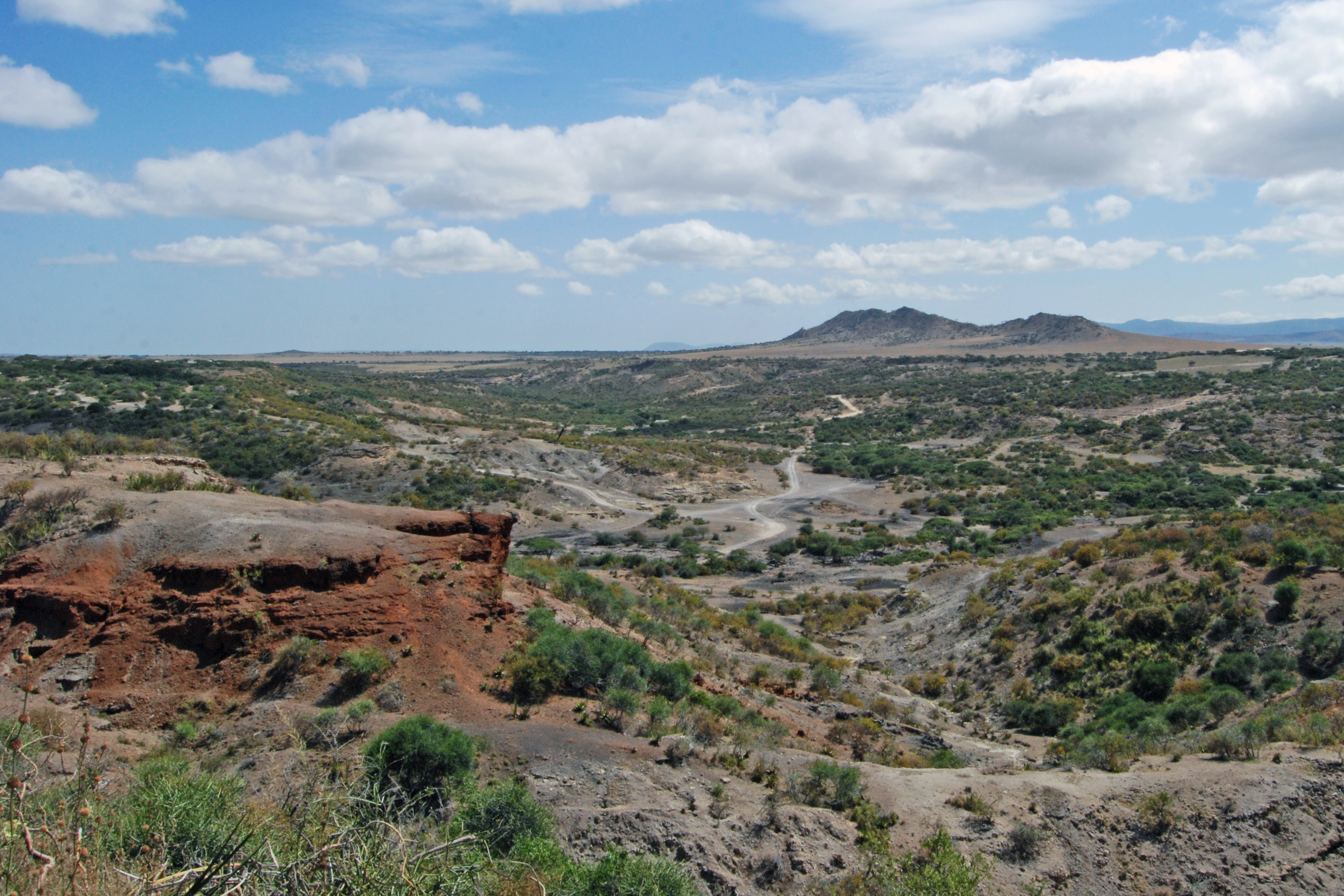
Olduvai Gorge, Tanzania

=== South Africa ===
- Blyde River Canyon, Mpumalanga
- Kloof, KwaZulu-Natal (The word Kloof means 'gorge' in Afrikaans)
- Komati Gorge
- Lanner Gorge
- Oribi Gorge, KwaZulu-Natal

=== Other countries ===
- Lesotho - Senqu River Canyon
- Lesotho - Maletsunyane River Gorge
- Lesotho - Makhaleng River Canyon
- Cameroon- Gorges de Kola
- Egypt- Arada Canyon
- Ethiopia- Blue Nile Gorge
- Madagascar- Isalo Canyon
- Mali—Talari Gorges
- Morocco- Todgha Gorge
- Namibia—Fish River Canyon
- Republic of Congo- Gorges of Diosso
- Tanzania—Olduvai Gorge
- Tunisia—Mides Canyon

== Americas ==
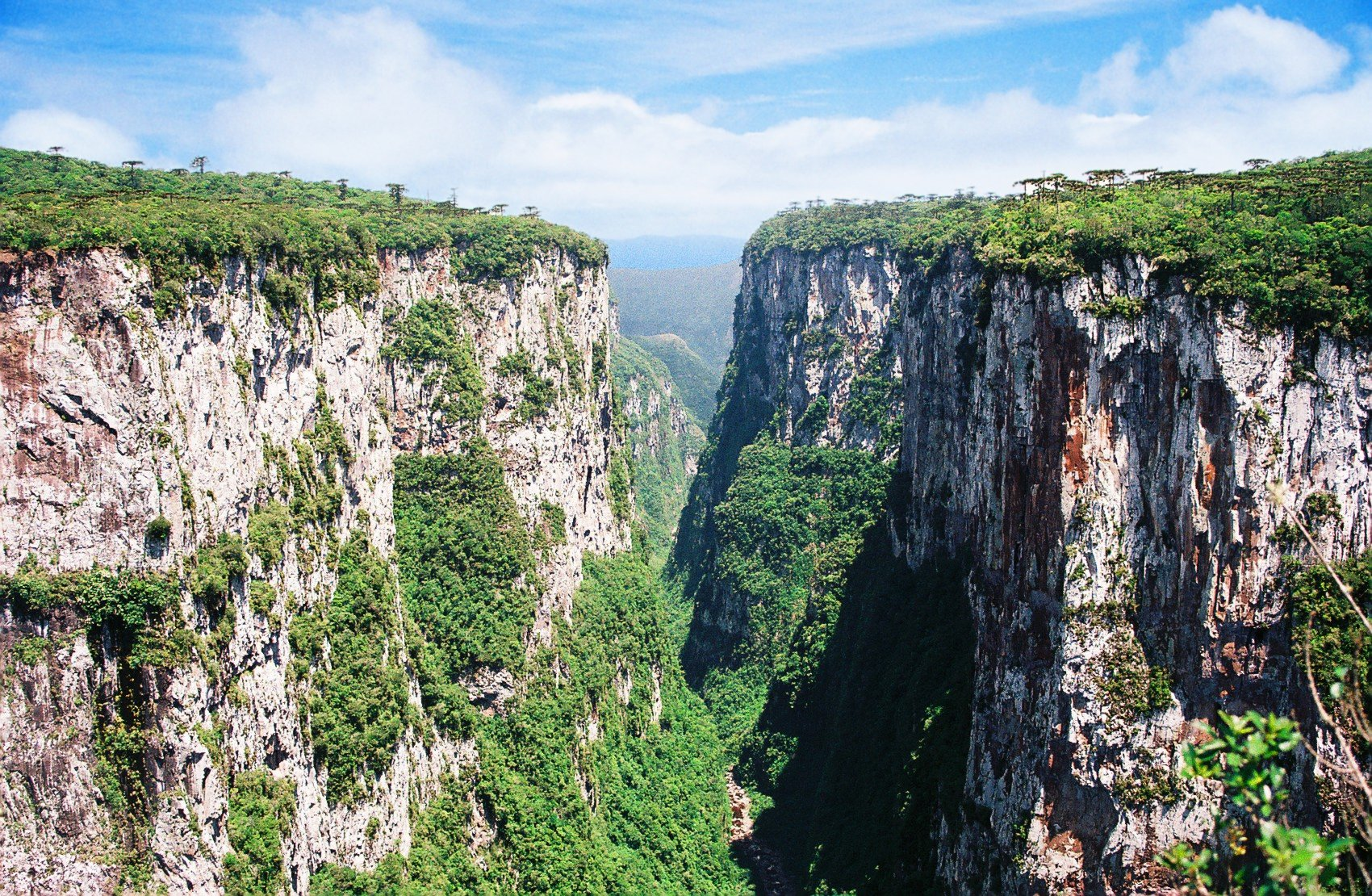
Itaimbezinho Canyon, Brazil

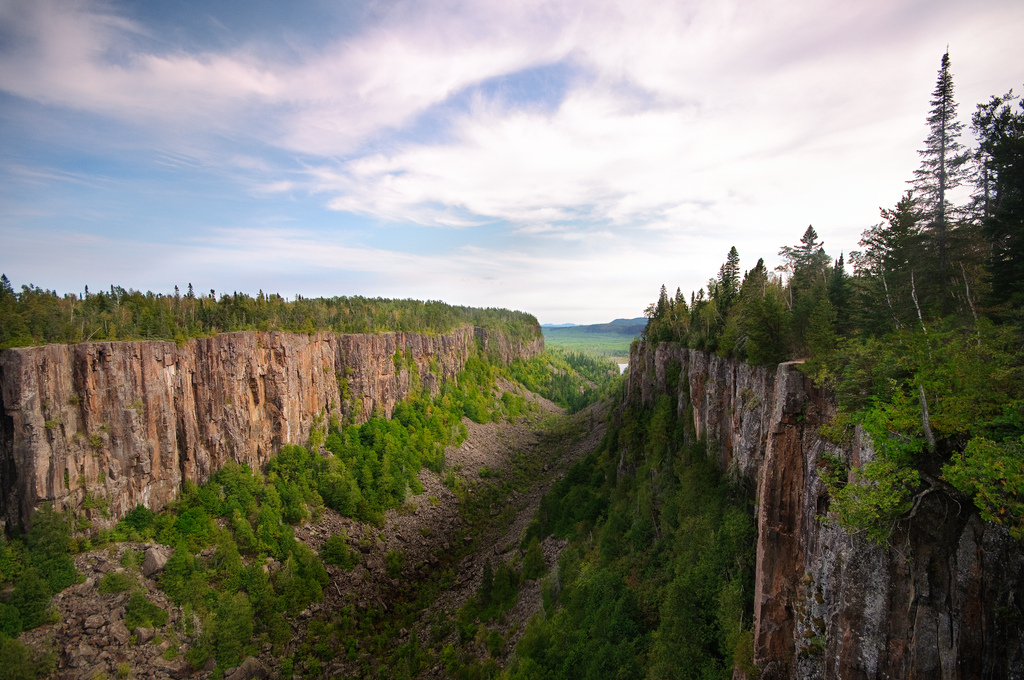
Ouimet Canyon, Canada

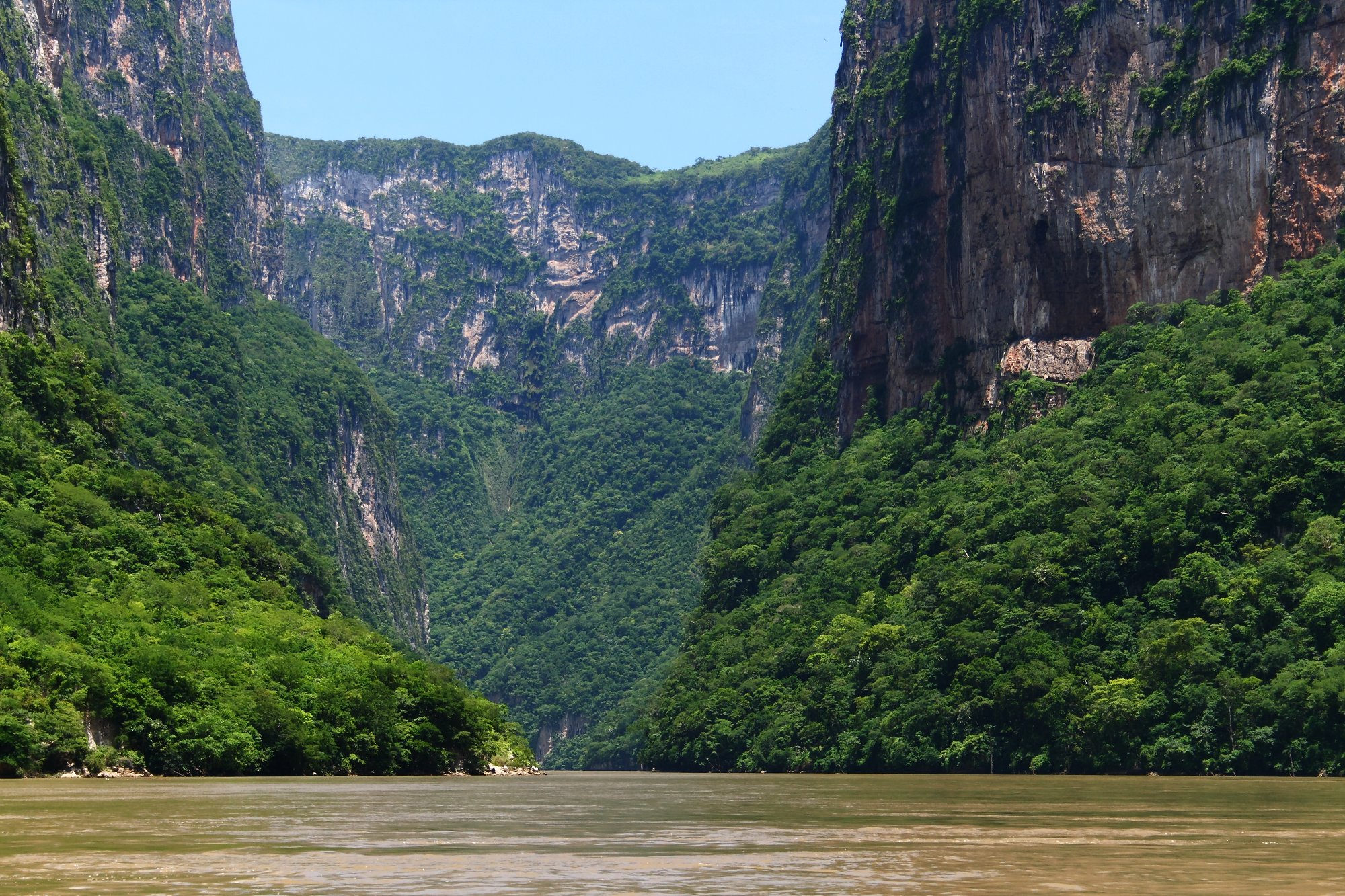
Sumidero Canyon, Mexico

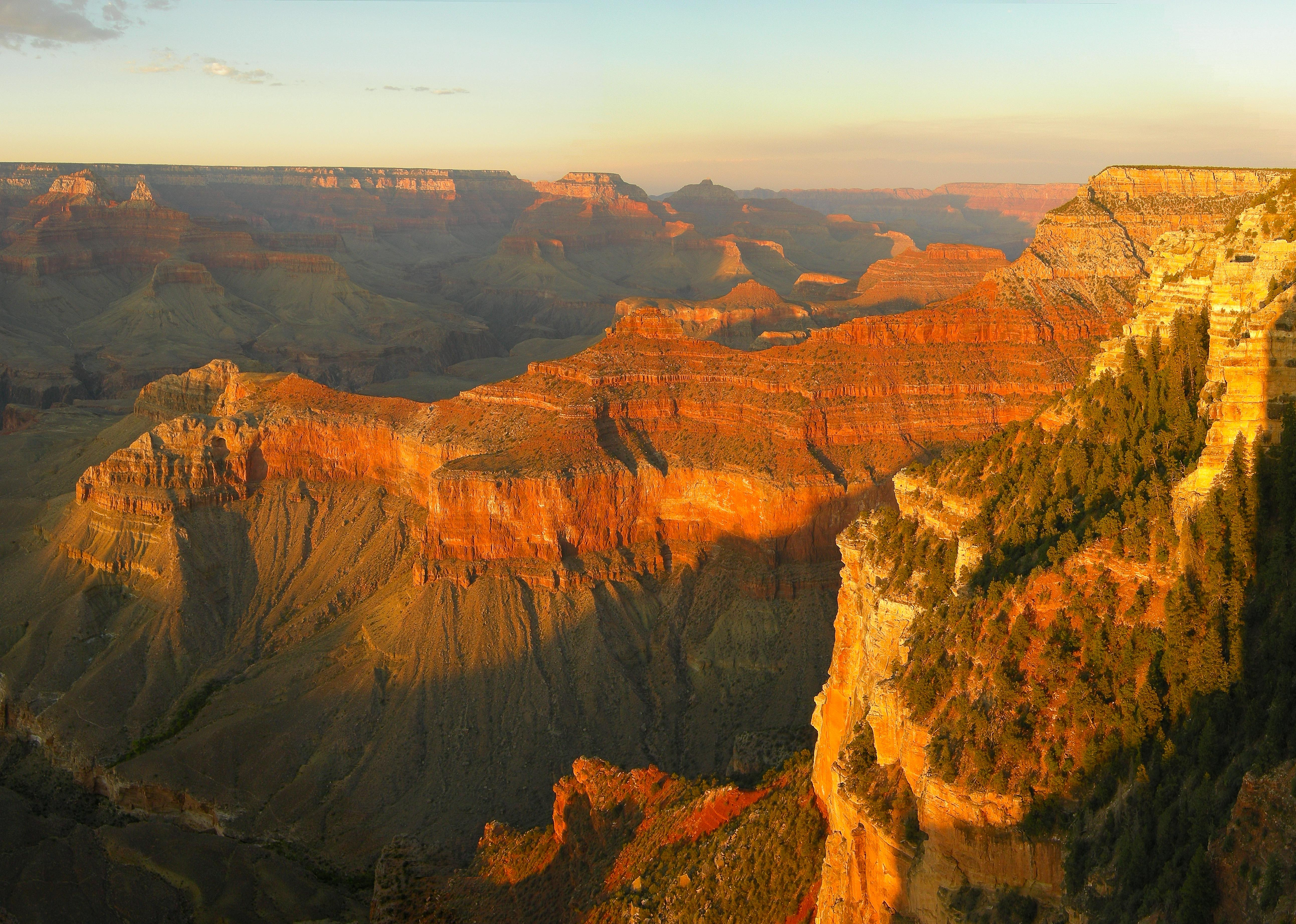
Grand Canyon, USA

=== Argentina ===
- Atuel Canyon, Mendoza Province
- Pinturas River Canyon, Santa Cruz Province
- Talampaya River Canyon

=== Brazil ===
- Guartelá Canyon, Paraná
- Itaimbezinho, Aparados da Serra National Park, Rio Grande do Sul
- Fortaleza Canyon, Aparados da Serra National Park, Rio Grande do Sul

=== Canada ===
- Agawa Canyon, Ontario
- Barron River (Ontario)
- Beggerlay Canyon, British Columbia
- Big Canyon, British Columbia
- Big Creek Canyon, British Columbia
- Bull Canyon, British Columbia
- Coaticook Gorge, Quebec
- Cottonwood Canyon, British Columbia
- Coquihalla Canyon, British Columbia
- Deserters Canyon, British Columbia
- Driftwood Canyon, British Columbia
- Eakin Creek Canyon, British Columbia
- Eaton Canyon, Quebec
- Farwell Canyon, British Columbia
- Fort George Canyon, British Columbia
- Fraser Canyon, British Columbia
- French Bar Canyon, British Columbia
- Giscome Canyon, British Columbia
- Grand Canyon of the Stikine, British Columbia
- Great Canyon (Homathko River), British Columbia
- The Green Bowl, British Columbia
- Hagwilget Canyon, British Columbia
- Helmcken Canyon, British Columbia
- Horseshoe Canyon, Alberta
- Horsethief Canyon, Alberta
- Kitselas Canyon, British Columbia
- Klinaklini Canyon, British Columbia
- Klootch Canyon, British Columbia
- Klootchman Canyon, British Columbia
- Lava Canyon, British Columbia
- Maligne Canyon, Alberta
- Marble Canyon, British Columbia
- Marie Canyon, British Columbia
- Mistaya Canyon, Alberta
- Nanaimo River Canyon, British Columbia
- Niagara Gorge, Ontario
- Ouimet Canyon, Ontario
- Painted Chasm, British Columbia
- Canyon Sainte-Anne, Quebec
- Waddington Canyon, British Columbia

=== Chile ===
- Cajón del Maipo, Santiago Metropolitan Region
- Caspana, El Loa Province

=== Colombia ===
- Chicamocha Canyon, Santander
- Saturban canyon, Santander

=== Mexico ===
- Barranca de Oblatos, Jalisco
- Copper Canyon, Chihuahua
- Huasteca Canyon, Monterrey
- Sumidero Canyon, Chiapas

=== Peru ===
- Colca Canyon, Arequipa
- Cotahuasi Canyon, Arequipa

=== United States ===
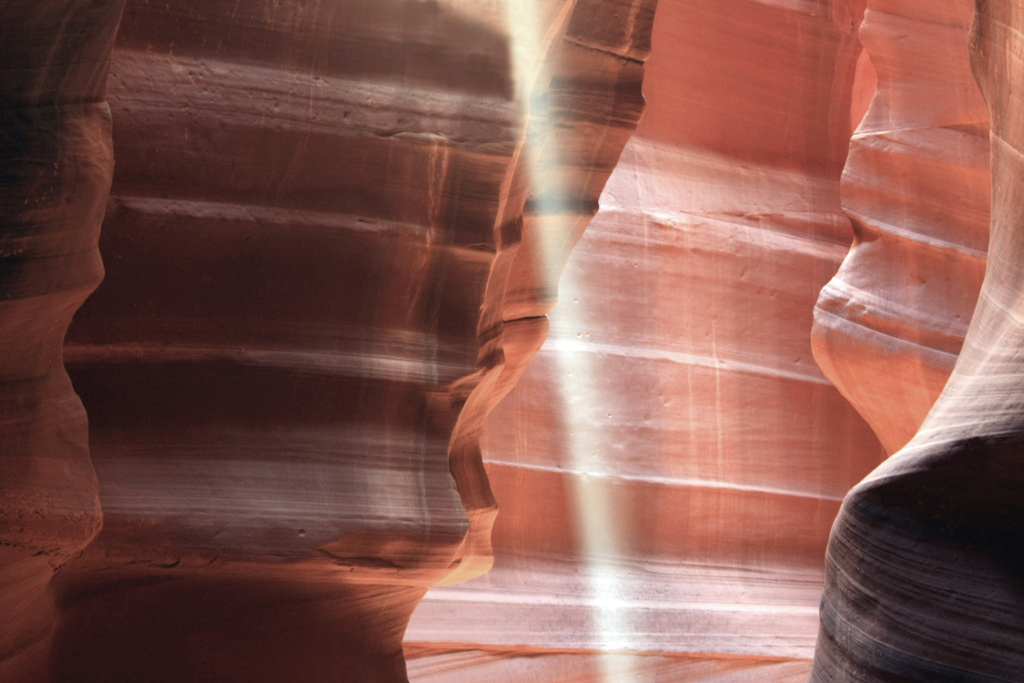
Antelope Canyon, Arizona

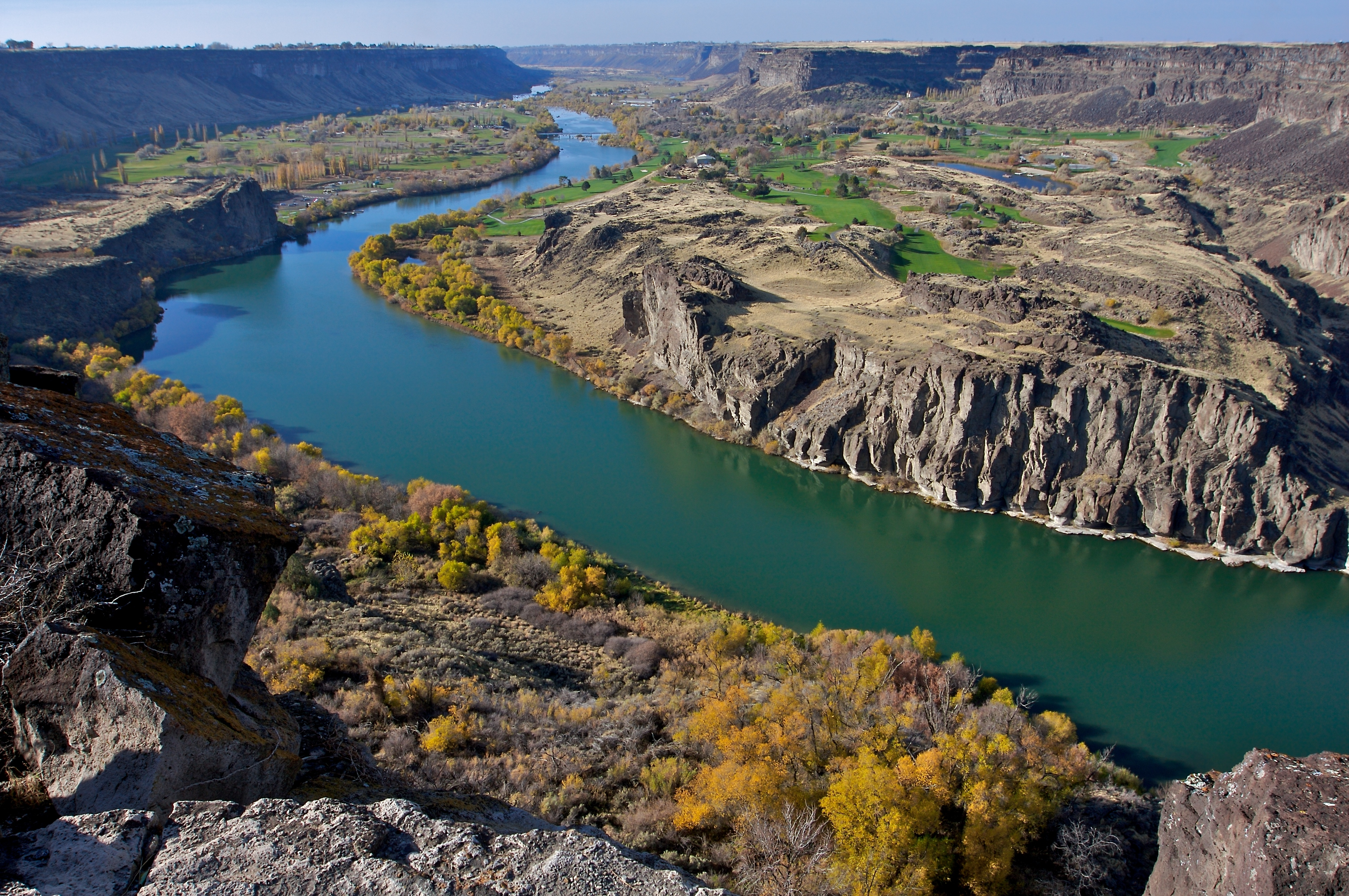
Snake River Canyon, Idaho

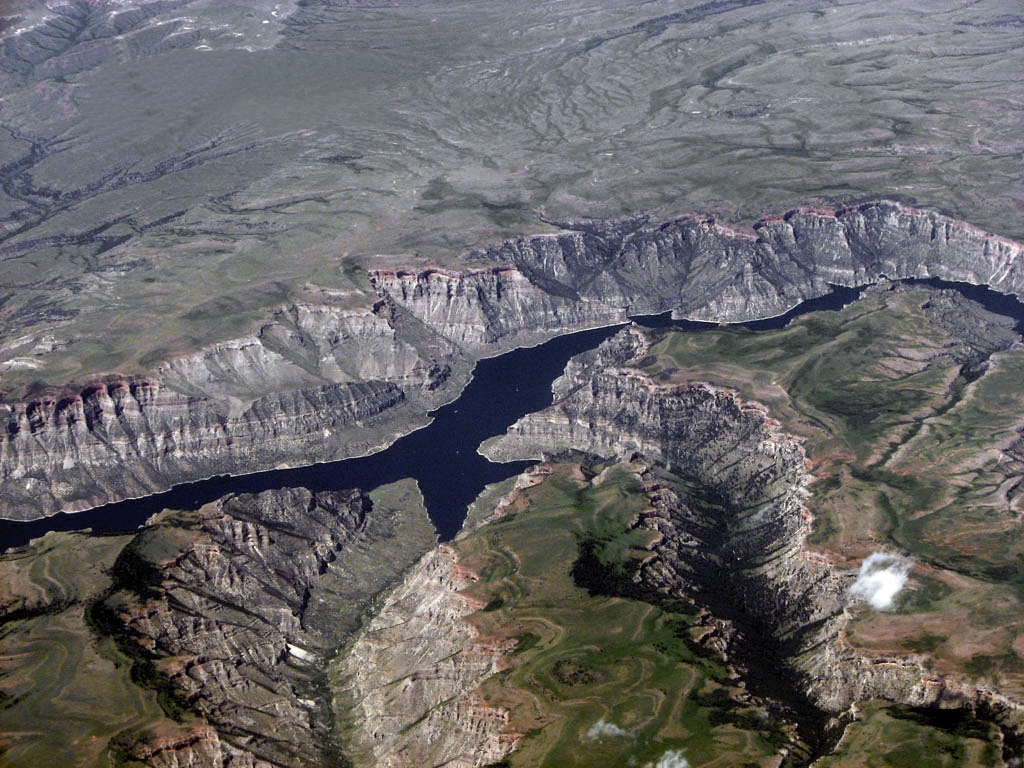
Bighorn Canyon, Montana and Wyoming

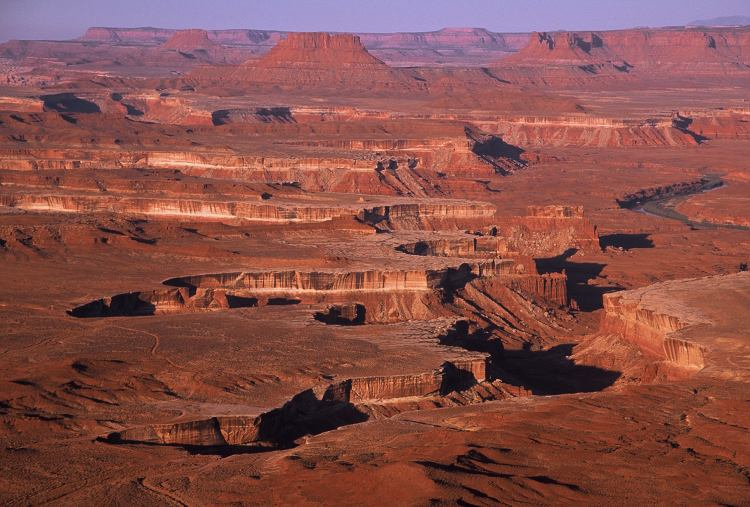
Green River Canyon, Canyonlands National Park, Utah
- Antelope Canyon, Arizona
- Ausable Chasm, New York
- Bad Rock Canyon, Montana
- Bad Branch Gorge, Kentucky
- Blackhand Gorge, Ohio
- Bighorn Canyon, Montana and Wyoming
- Big South Fork of the Cumberland River gorge, Kentucky and Tennessee
- Big Thompson River Canyon, Colorado
- Black Canyon of the Gunnison, Colorado
- Blackwater Canyon, West Virginia
- Bluejohn Canyon, Utah—site of Aron Ralston's accident
- Breaks Canyon, Kentucky and Virginia
- Buckskin Gulch, Utah—possibly the longest, deepest slot canyon in the world at over 13 mi (21 km); a tributary of the Paria River
- Cane Creek Canyon, Alabama
- Canyon de Chelly, Arizona
- Canyonlands National Park, canyons of the Colorado River and its main tributary the Green River, Utah
- Canyons of the Escalante, Grand Staircase–Escalante National Monument, Utah
- Cataract Canyon, Utah
- Chaco Canyon, New Mexico
- Cheat Canyon, West Virginia
- Chesterfield Gorge, Massachusetts
- Chitistone Canyon, Alaska
- Cloudland Canyon, Georgia
- Columbia River Gorge, Washington and Oregon
- Desolation Canyon, Utah
- Dismals Canyon, Alabama
- Echo Canyon, Nevada
- Fall Brook Gorge, New York
- Flaming Gorge, Utah and Wyoming
- Flume Gorge, New Hampshire
- Franklin Gorge, West Virginia
- Fremont River Canyon, Utah
- Gates of Lodore, Colorado
- Genesee River Gorge, New York
- Glen Canyon, Utah and Arizona
- Glenwood Canyon, Colorado
- Grand Canyon, Grand Canyon National Park, Arizona
- Grand Canyon of the Tuolumne, Yosemite National Park, California
- Grand Canyon of the Yellowstone, Yellowstone National Park, Wyoming
- Grand Coulee, Washington
- Gulf Hagas, Maine
- Hells Canyon, Idaho, Oregon and Washington
- Horseshoe Canyon, Utah
- James River Gorge, Virginia
- Kaaterskill Clove, New York
- Kanuti Canyon, Alaska
- Kern Canyon, California
- Kings Canyon, California
- Kolob Canyons, Zion National Park, Utah
- Keystone Canyon, Alaska
- Lehigh River Gorge, Pennsylvania
- Linville Gorge, North Carolina
- Little River Canyon, Alabama
- Logan Canyon, Utah
- Marble Canyon, Arizona
- Mather Gorge, Maryland and Virginia
- Mississippi Gorge, Minnesota
- Mianus River Gorge, New York
- Moses Coulee, Washington
- McKittrick Canyon, Guadalupe Mountains National Park, Texas
- New River Gorge, West Virginia
- Neversink Gorge, New York
- Niagara Gorge, New York
- Nine Mile Canyon, Utah
- Noatak Canyon, Alaska
- Palo Duro Canyon, Texas
- Paria River Canyon, southern Utah into northern Arizona
- Pine Creek Gorge, Pennsylvania
- Providence Canyon, Georgia
- Provo Canyon, Utah
- Quartermaster Canyon, Grand Canyon National Park, Arizona
- Quechee Gorge, Vermont
- Red River Gorge, Kentucky
- Rio Grande Gorge, New Mexico
- Ripogenus Gorge, Maine
- Royal Gorge, Colorado
- Ruby Canyon, Colorado and Utah
- Sabino Canyon, Arizona
- Saint Christopher's Canyon, Aibonito and Barranquitas, Puerto Rico
- Salt River Canyon, Arizona
- San Rafael River Gorge, Utah
- Santa Elena Canyon, Big Bend National Park, Texas (also in Big Bend N.P.: Boquillas and Mariscal Canyons)
- Spearfish Canyon, South Dakota
- Smoke Hole Canyon, West Virginia
- Tallulah Gorge, Georgia
- Tennessee River Gorge, Tennessee into Alabama
- The Trough, West Virginia
- Turnback Canyon, Alaska
- Titus Canyon, Death Valley, California (also in Death Valley: Golden, Mosaic and Natural Bridge Canyons)
- Virgin River Gorge, Arizona and Utah
- Waimea Canyon, Hawaii
- Walnut Canyon, Arizona
- Westwater Canyon, Utah
- Wind River Canyon, Wyoming
- Winner Creek Gorge, Alaska
- Wintergreen Gorge, Pennsylvania
- Yakima River Canyon, Washington
- Zion Canyon, Utah

=== Other countries ===
- Bolivia—Grand Canyon of Torotoro, Torotoro, Potosi Department
- Nicaragua—Somoto Canyon, Somoto, Madriz

== Asia ==
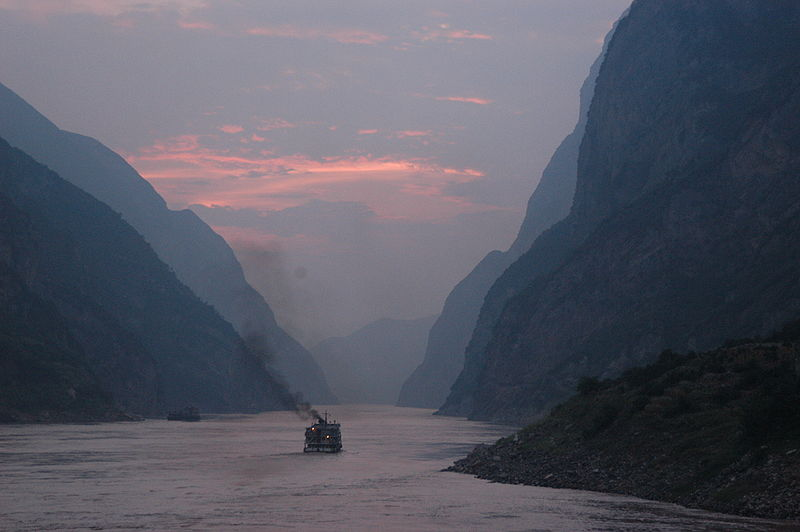
One of the Three Gorges of the Yangtze river, China

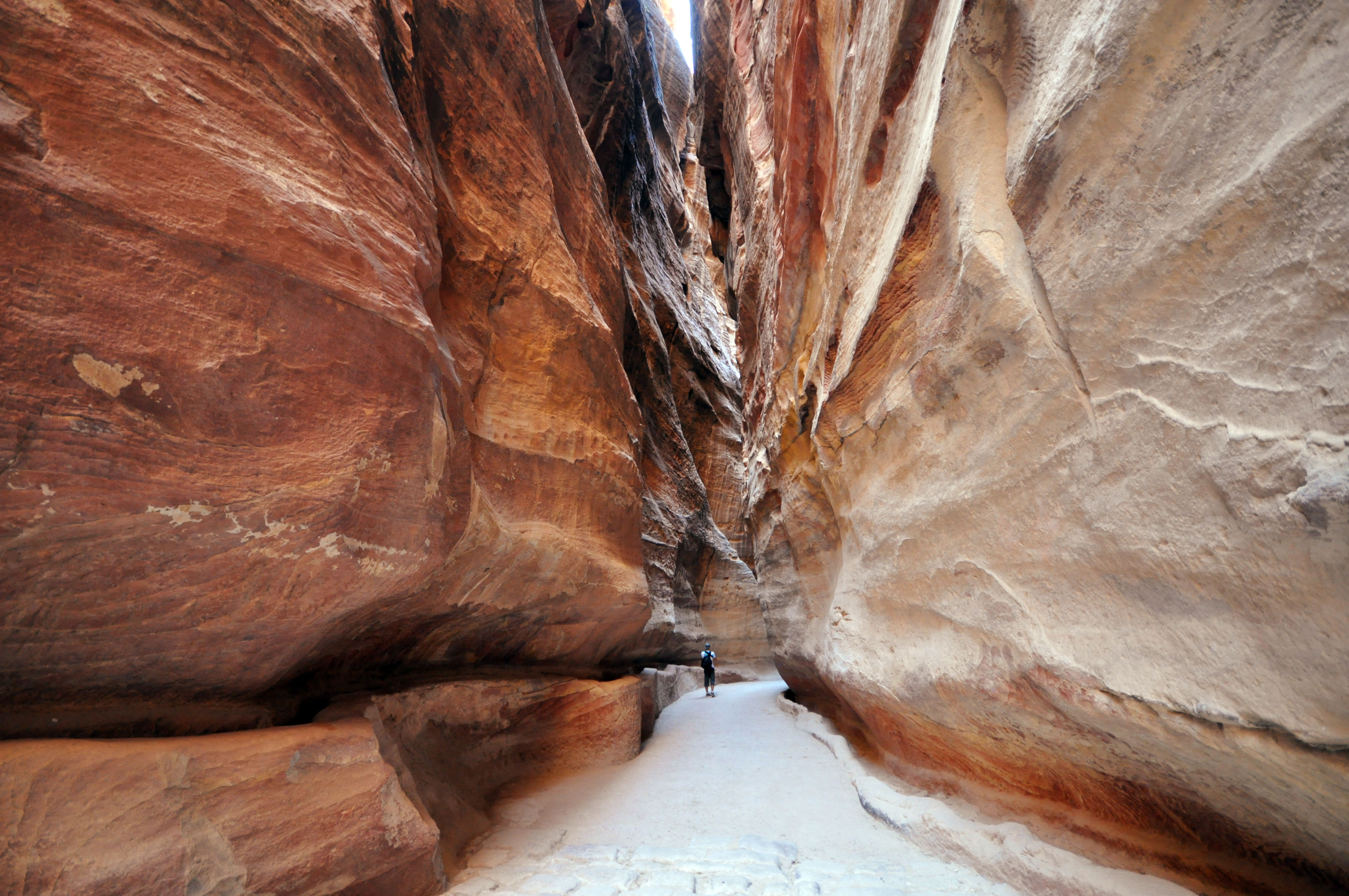
Siq, Jordan

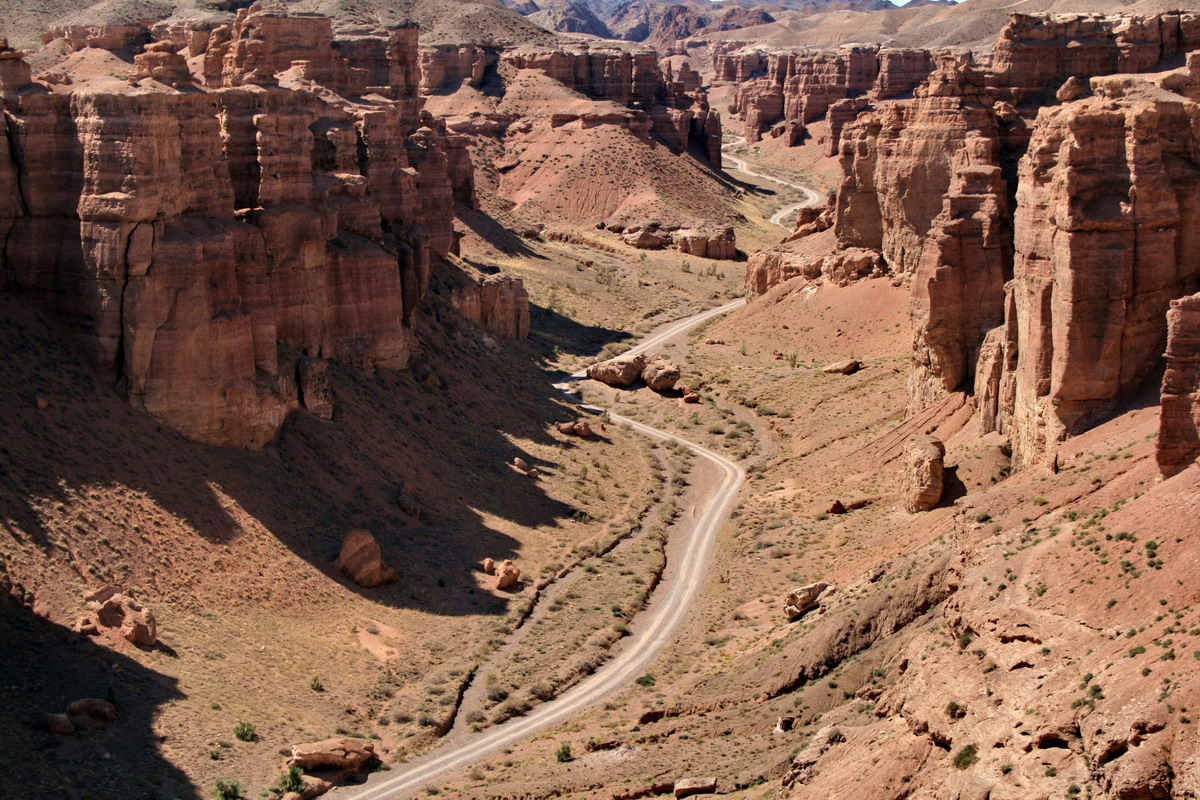
Sharyn Canyon, Kazakhstan

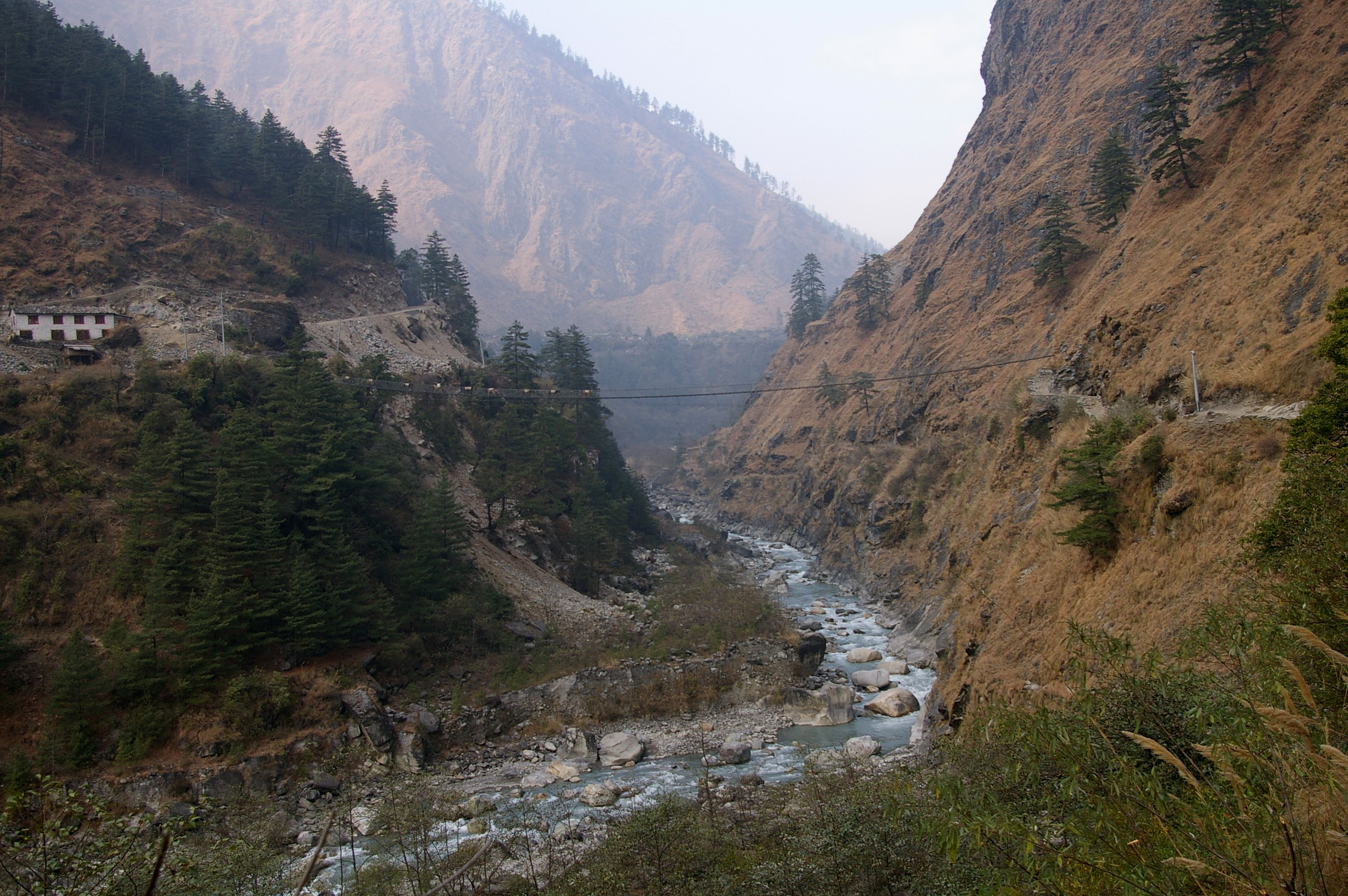
Kali Gandaki Gorge, Nepal

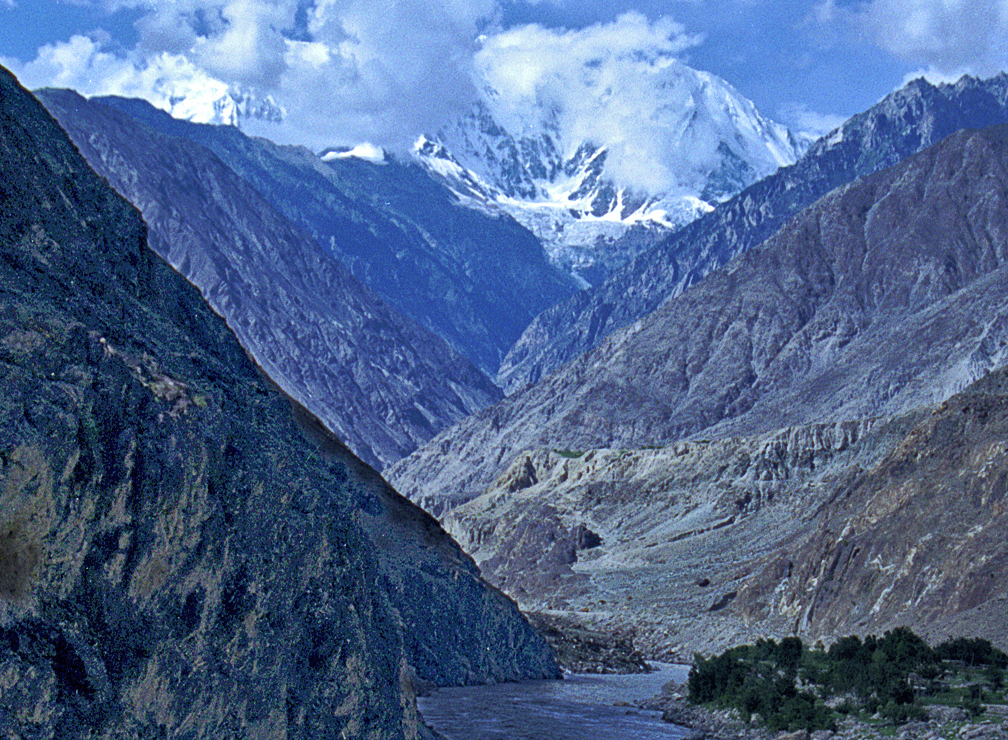
Indus River Gorge, Pakistan

=== China ===
- Huguan Taihang Grand Canyon, Shanxi
- Longtan Grand Canyon, Hebei
- Norton Couloir, Tibet
- Qutang Gorge, Hubei
- Red Stone Gorge, Henan
- Taihangshan Gorge, Shanxi
- Three Gorges, Chongqing
- Three Parallel Rivers, Yunnan
- Tiger Leaping Gorge, Yunnan
- Wu Gorge, Hubei
- Xiling Gorge, Hubei
- Yarlung Tsangpo Grand Canyon, Tibet Autonomous Region
- Yarlung Zangbo Grand Canyon, Tibet Autonomous Region

=== Nepal ===
- Chovar Gorge, Kathmandu
- Kali Gandaki Gorge, Gandaki

=== India ===
- Gandikota, Kadapa District, Andhra Pradesh
- Garadia Mahadev, Kota district, Rajasthan
- Idukki, Western Ghats, Kerala
- Raneh Falls, Chatarpur district, Madhya Pradesh
- Satkosia Tiger Reserve, Angul district, Odisha
- Dayangmukh, Dima Hasao, Assam
- Assi Ganga, Uttarkashi, Uttarakhand
- Shatadru, Kufri, Himachal Pradesh

=== Philippines ===
- Bued Gorge, Benguet
- Montalban Gorge, Central Luzon

=== Other countries ===
- Indonesia—Cukang Taneuh, Pangandaran, Brown Canyon in Semarang
- Jordan—Siq, Petra
- Kazakhstan—Sharyn Canyon
- Kyrgyz Republic—Ala Archa gorge of Ala Archa National Park
- Oman—Wadi Ghul
- Pakistan—Indus River Gorge through the Himalaya; Soan River gorge
- Taiwan—Taroko Gorge of Taroko National Park
- Türkiye Horma Canyon Kastamonu Province/Pınarbaşı district
- Türkiye Valla Canyon Kastamonu Province /Pınarbaşı district s(The first deepest Canyon of Türkiye and The second deepest Canyon of the World)

== Europe ==
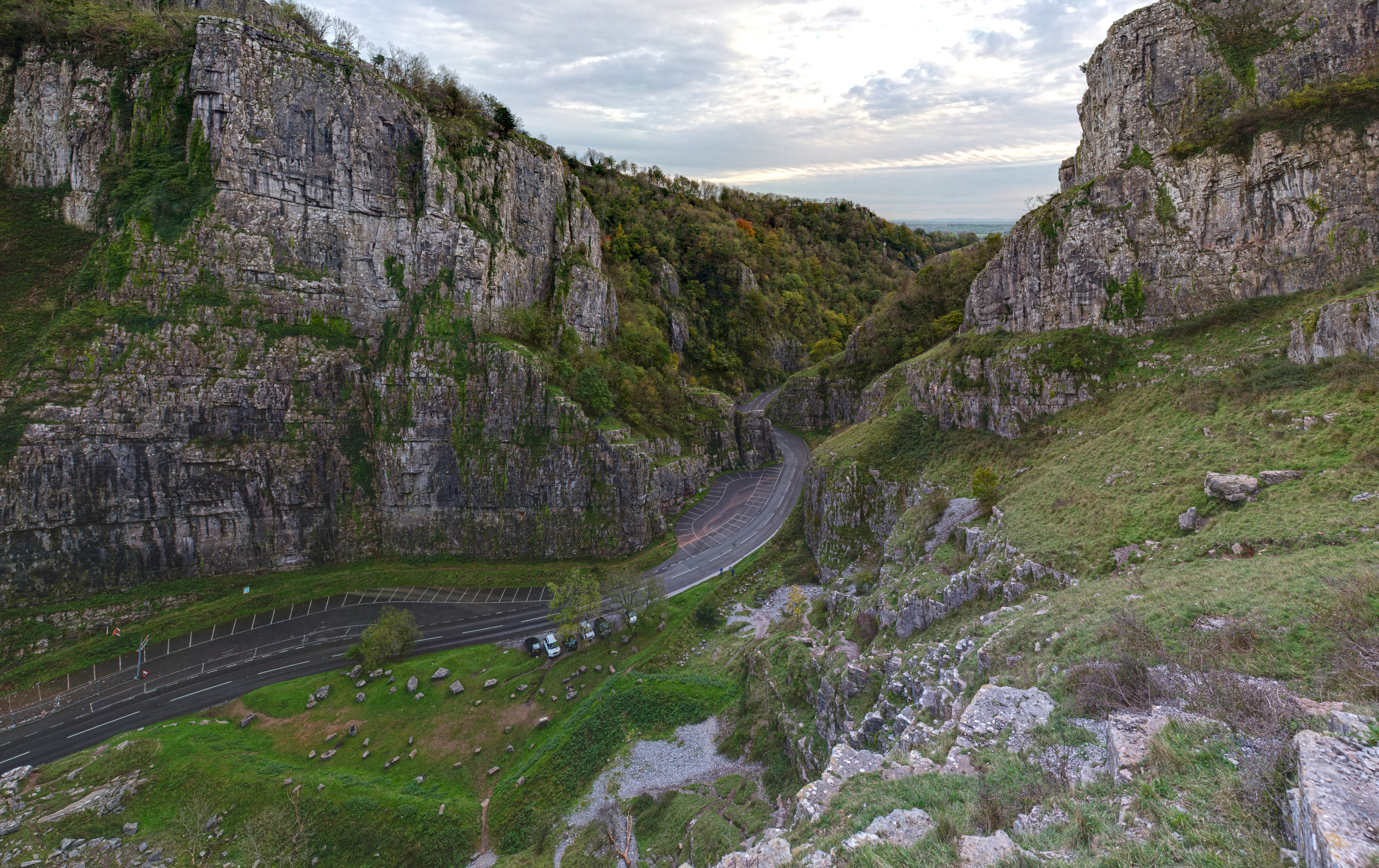
Cheddar Gorge, England

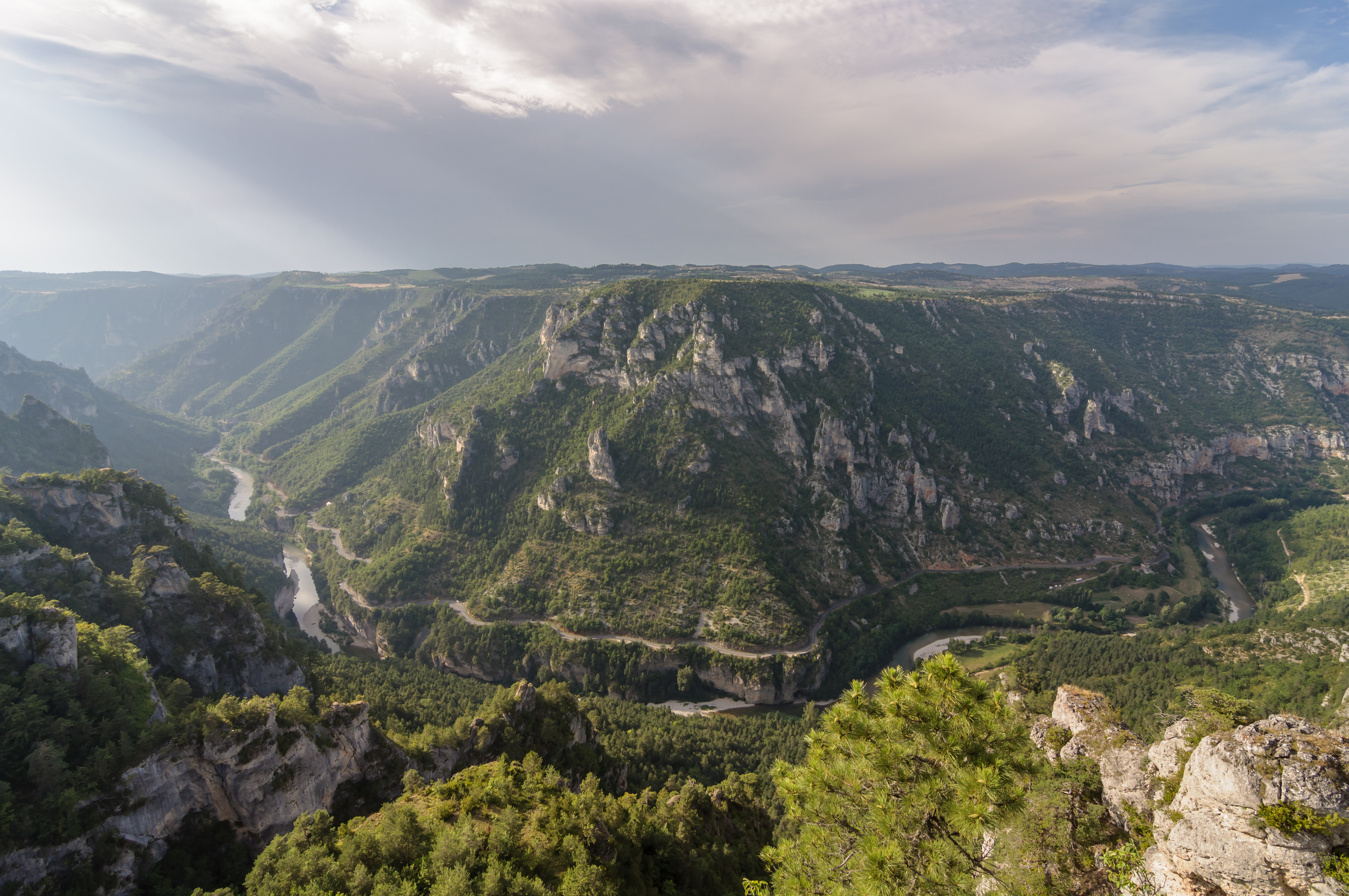
Gorges du Tarn, France

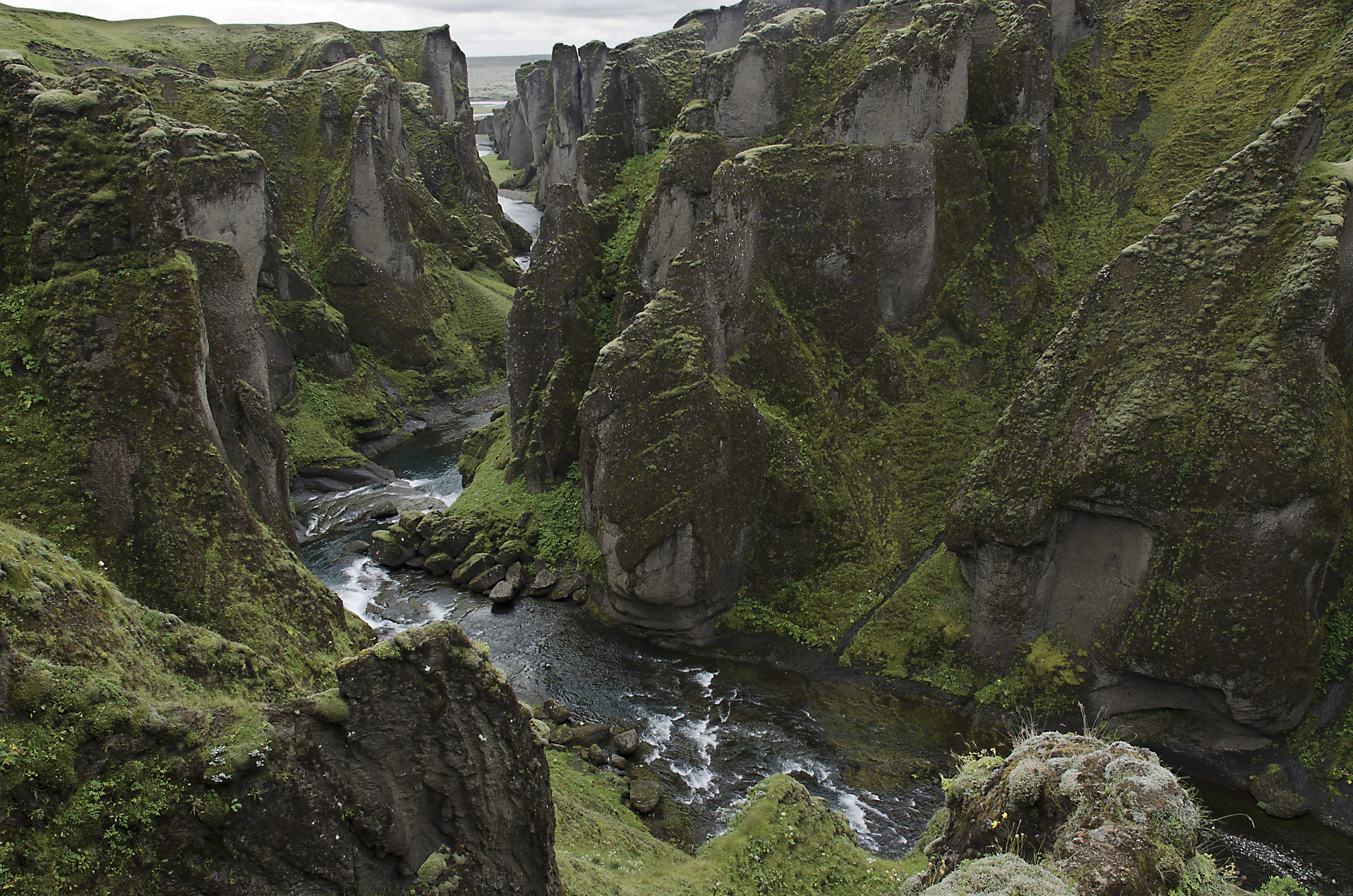
Fjaðrárgljúfur Canyon, Iceland

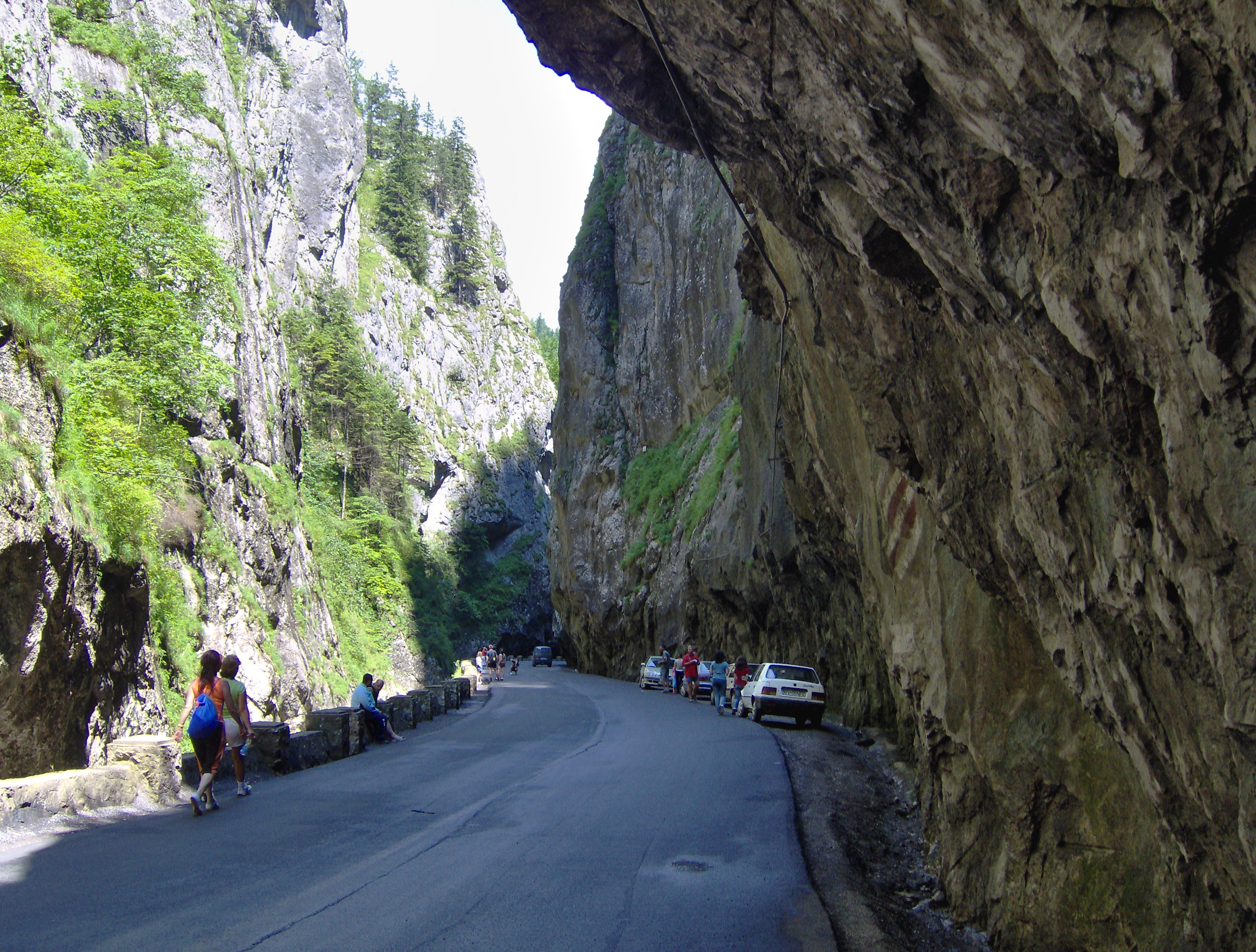
Bicaz Gorge, Romania

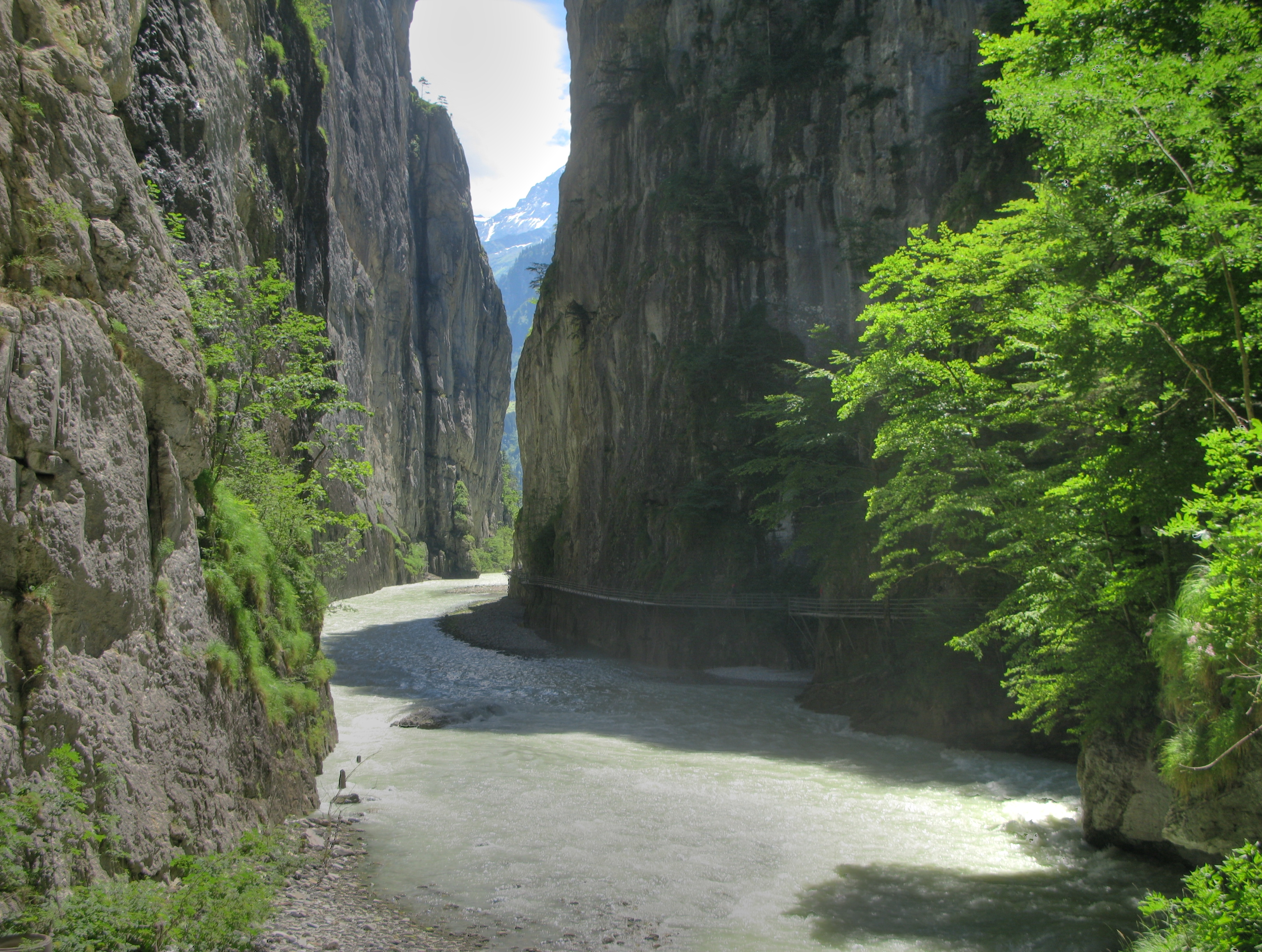
Aare Gorge, Switzerland

=== Albania ===
- Osum Gorge
- Këlcyrë Gorge

=== Austria ===
- Leutasch Gorge, Tyrol
- Liechtensteinklamm, Salzburg
- Rappenloch Gorge, Vorarlberg

=== France ===
- Ardèche Gorges, Auvergne-Rhône-Alpes
- Daluis Gorge, Provence-Alpes-Côte d'Azur
- Gorges du Tarn, Occitanie
- Verdon Gorge, Provence-Alpes-Côte d'Azur

=== Georgia ===
- Aragvi River Gorge
- Pankisi Gorge
- Okaze canyon
- Martvili canyon

=== Germany ===
- Danube Gorge, Bavaria
- Entenloch Gorge, partially in Bavaria
- Mensinger Ravine, Northrhine-Westphalia
- Partnach Gorge, Bavaria
- Rhine Gorge, Rhineland-Palatine and Hesse
- Spetzgarter Gorge, Baden-Württemberg
- Wutach Gorge, Baden-Württemberg

=== Greece ===
- Agia Eirini Gorge, Crete
- Ha Gorge, Crete
- Imbros Gorge, Crete
- Kotsifos Gorge, Crete
- Kourtaliotiko Gorge, Crete
- Richtis Gorge, Crete
- Sarakina Gorge, Crete
- Samaria Gorge, Crete
- Vikos Gorge, Vikos–Aoös National Park

=== Ireland ===
- Gap of Dunloe, County Kerry
- Mizen Head, County Cork
- The Scalp, County Dublin

=== Italy ===
- Bletterbach, South Tyrol
- Cavagrande del Cassibile, Sicily
- Gorropu, Sardinia
- Furlo Pass, Marche

=== Kosovo ===
- Rugova Canyon

=== Montenegro ===
- Morača Canyon
- Tara River Canyon
- Piva Canyon

=== Norway ===
- Allmannajuvet Canyon, Rogaland
- Jutulhogget Canyon, Hedmark
- Jutulhogget Canyon, Oppland
- Mågålaupet Gorge, Sør-Trøndelag
- Sautso Canyon, Finnmark

=== Russia ===
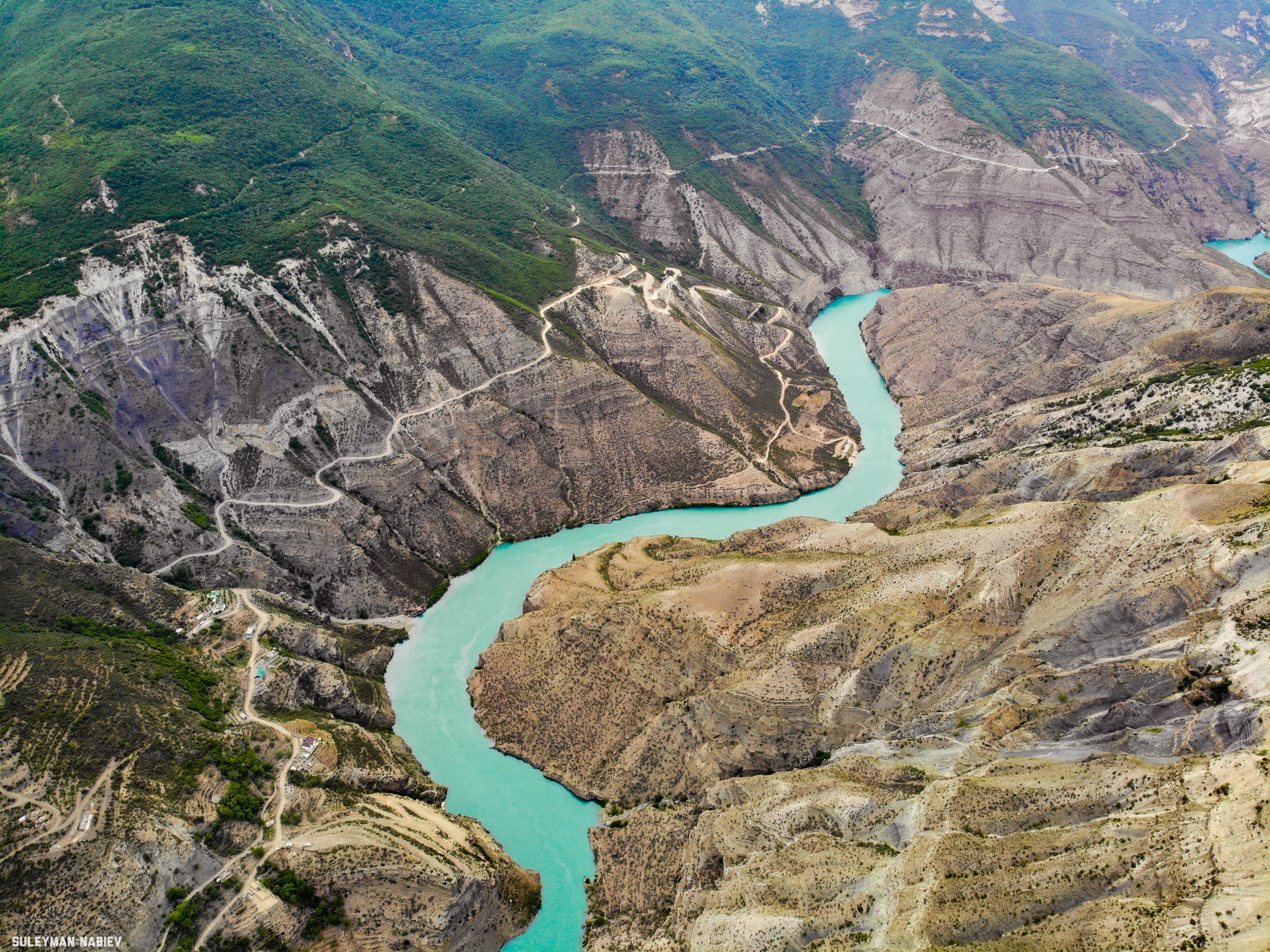
Sulak Canyon in Dagestan

- Kistin Gorge, Ingushetia
- Sulak Canyon, Dagestan

=== Spain ===
- Arribes del Duero Natural Park, Castile and León
- Congost de Mont-Rebei, Catalonia
- Desfiladero de los Gaitanes; location of the Caminito del Rey, Andalusia
- Despeñaperros, Andalusia
- Duratón River Gorges, Castile and León
- Ordesa y Monte Perdido, Aragon
- Sierra y Cañones Guara, Aragon
- Sil Canyon, Galicia

=== Switzerland ===
See also

- Aare Gorge, Bern
- Küsnachter Tobel, Zurich
- Rofla Gorge, Grisons
- Ruinaulta, Grisons
- Schöllenen Gorge, Uri
- Tamina Gorge, St. Gallen
- Taubenloch, Bern
- Trient Gorges, Valais
- Viamala, Grisons

=== Turkey ===
- Boğazpınar Canyon, Mersin Province
- Harmanköy Canyon, Bilecik
- Ulubey Canyon, Uşak
- Valla Canyon, Küre, Kastamonu

=== United Kingdom ===
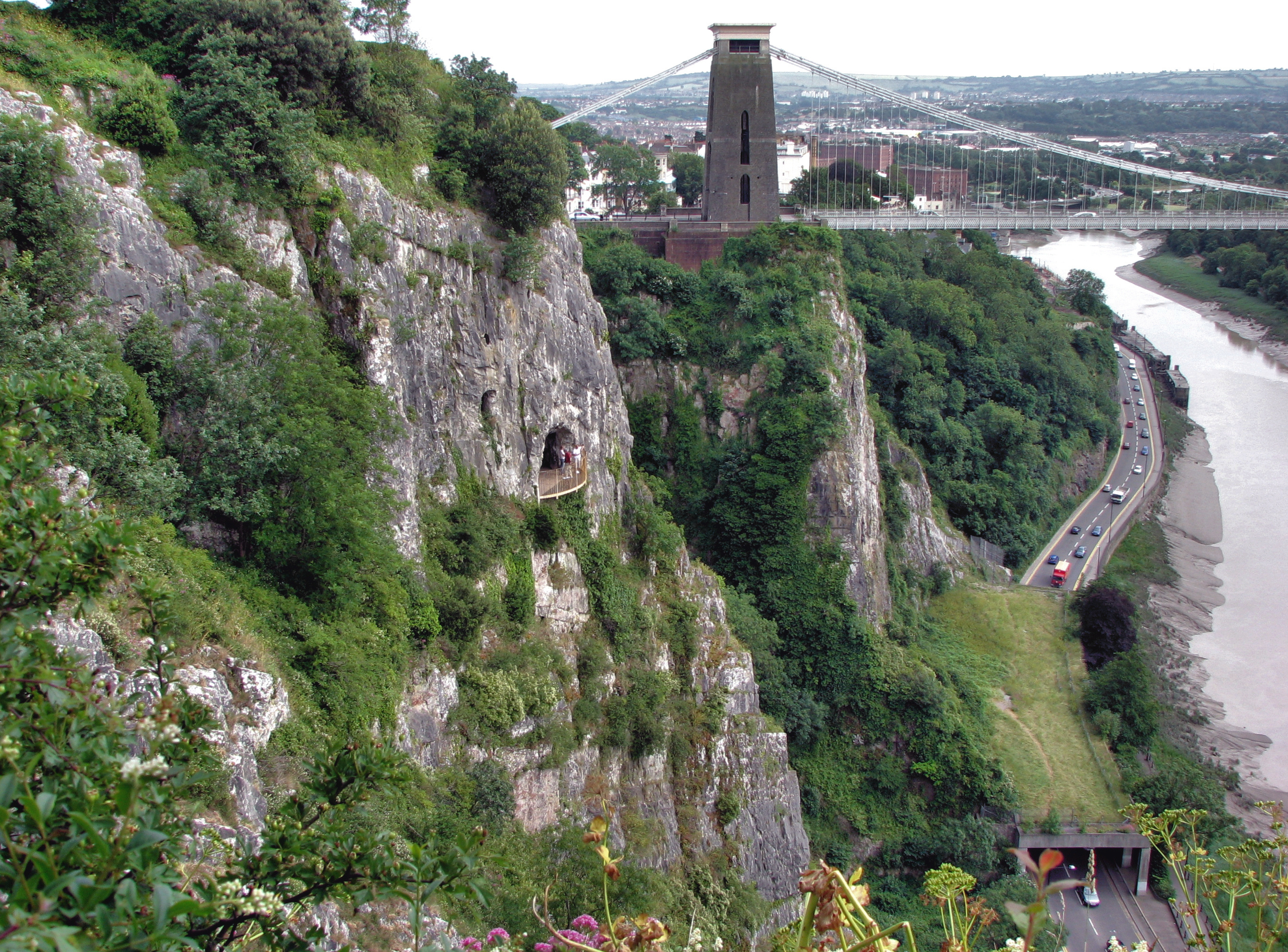
Avon Gorge, Bristol, England

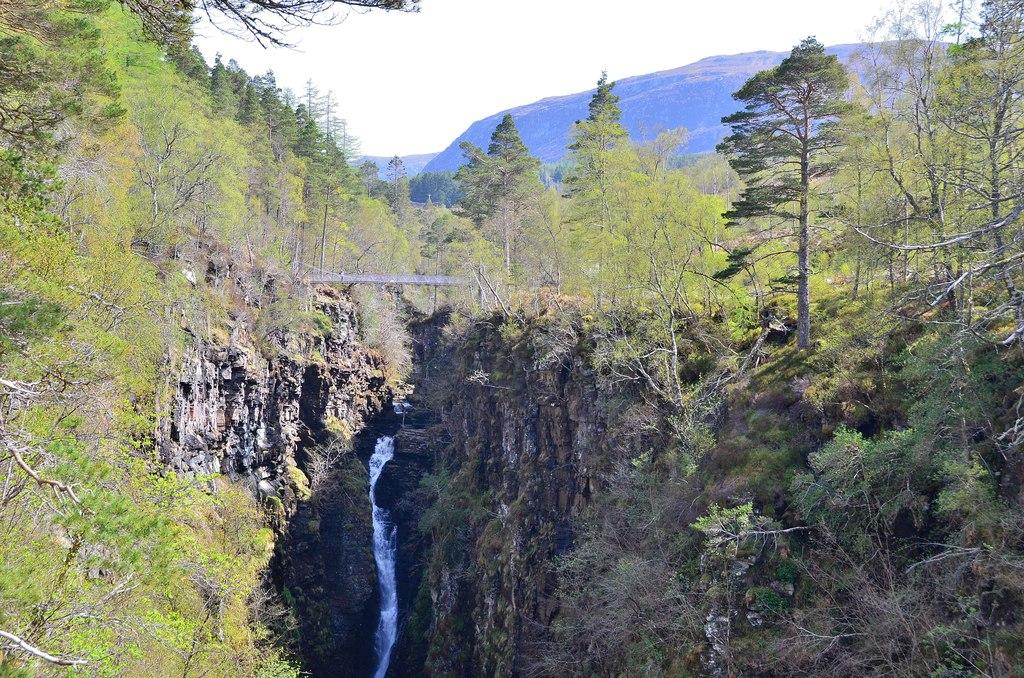
Corrieshalloch Gorge, Ross-shire, Scotland

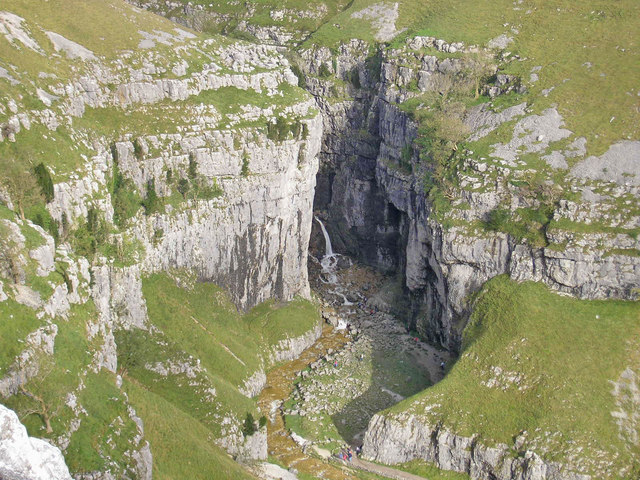
Gordale Scar, Yorkshire, England

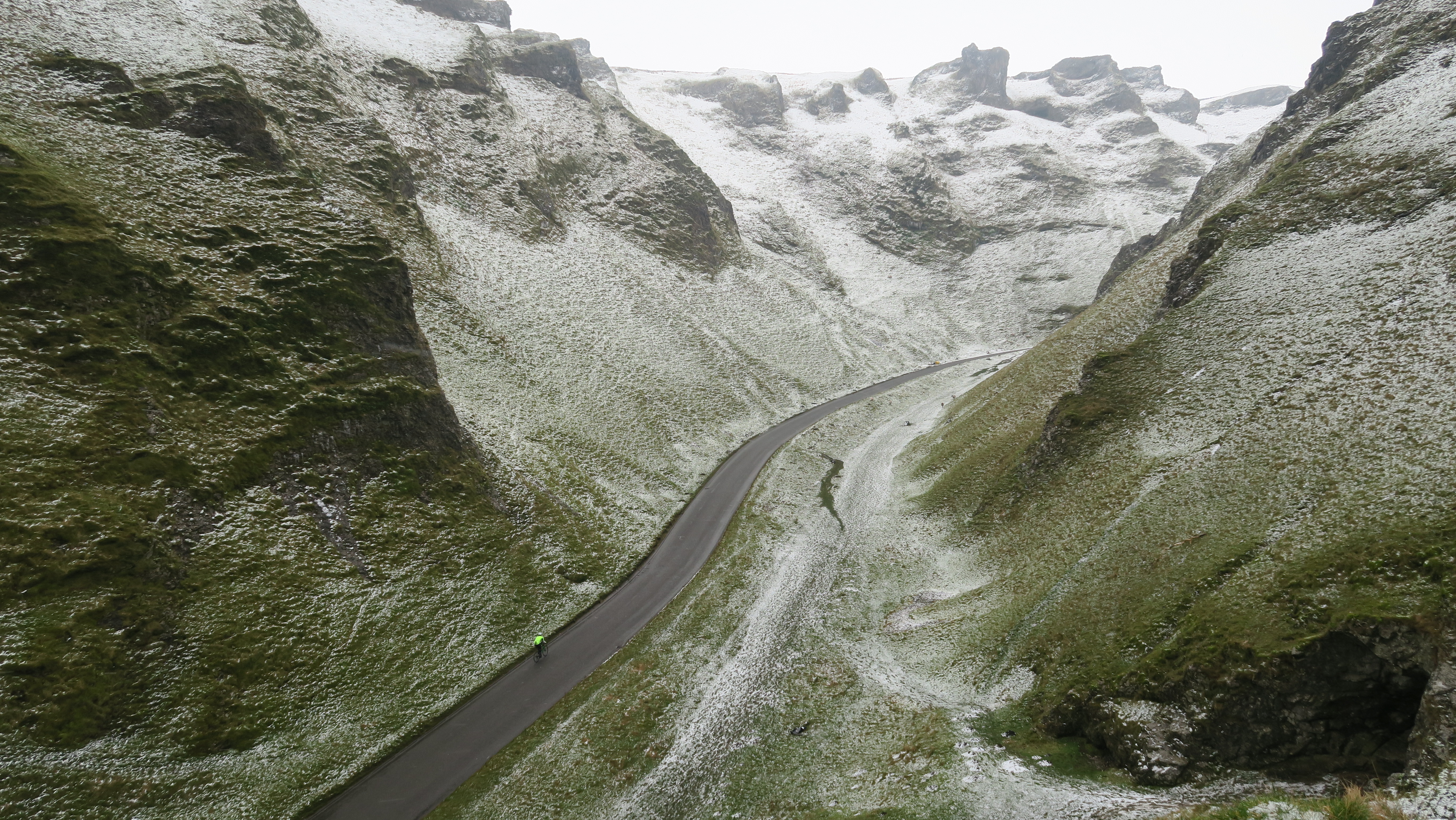
Winnats Pass, Derbyshire, England

England

- Avon Gorge, in Bristol, Somerset and Gloucestershire
- Burrington Combe, Somerset
- Cauldron Snout, County Durham
- Cheddar Gorge, Somerset
- Chee Dale, Derbyshire
- Cliviger Gorge, Lancashire
- Cresswell Crags, Nottinghamshire
- Deep Dale, Derbyshire
- Ebbor Gorge, Somerset
- Gordale Scar, Yorkshire
- Harehope Canyon, Northumberland
- Hen Hole, Northumberland
- High Cup Gill, Westmorland
- How Stean Gorge, Yorkshire
- Ironbridge Gorge, Shropshire
- Lud's Church, Staffordshire
- Piers Gill, Cumberland
- Sleightholme Beck Gorge, Yorkshire
- Staward Gorge, Northumberland
- Trollers Gill, Yorkshire
- Winnats Pass, Derbyshire

Scotland

- Ailnack Gorge, Banffshire
- Alva Glen, Clackmannanshire
- Avon Gorge, Stirlingshire and West Lothian
- Black Rock Gorge, Ross-shire
- Burn o' Vat, Aberdeenshire
- Corrieshalloch Gorge, Ross-shire
- Craighall Gorge, Perthshire
- Crichope Linn, Dumfriesshire
- Daal of Lumbister, Shetland
- Dean Gorge in Edinburgh, Midlothian
- Dob's Linn, Dumfriesshire
- Finnich Glen, Stirlingshire
- Glen Valtos on Isle of Lewis, Outer Hebrides
- Ness Glen, Ayrshire
- Nethan Gorge, Lanarkshire
- Puck's Glen, Argyllshire

Wales

- Aberglaslyn Pass, Caernarfonshire
- Alyn Gorge, Denbighshire and Flintshire
- Ceunant Cynfal, Merionethshire
- Ceunant Llennyrch, Merionethshire
- Clydach Gorge, Monmouthshire
- Dylife Gorge, Montgomeryshire
- Fairy Glen (Ffos Anoddun), at Betws-y-Coed, Caernarfonshire

=== Other countries ===
- Bulgaria—Trigrad Gorge
- Greenland—Greenland's Grand Canyon
- Iceland—Fjaðrárgljúfur Canyon
- Macedonia—Matka Canyon
- Romania—Bicaz Gorge
- Kosovo—Rugova Canyon
- Ukraine—Dniester Canyon

== Oceania ==
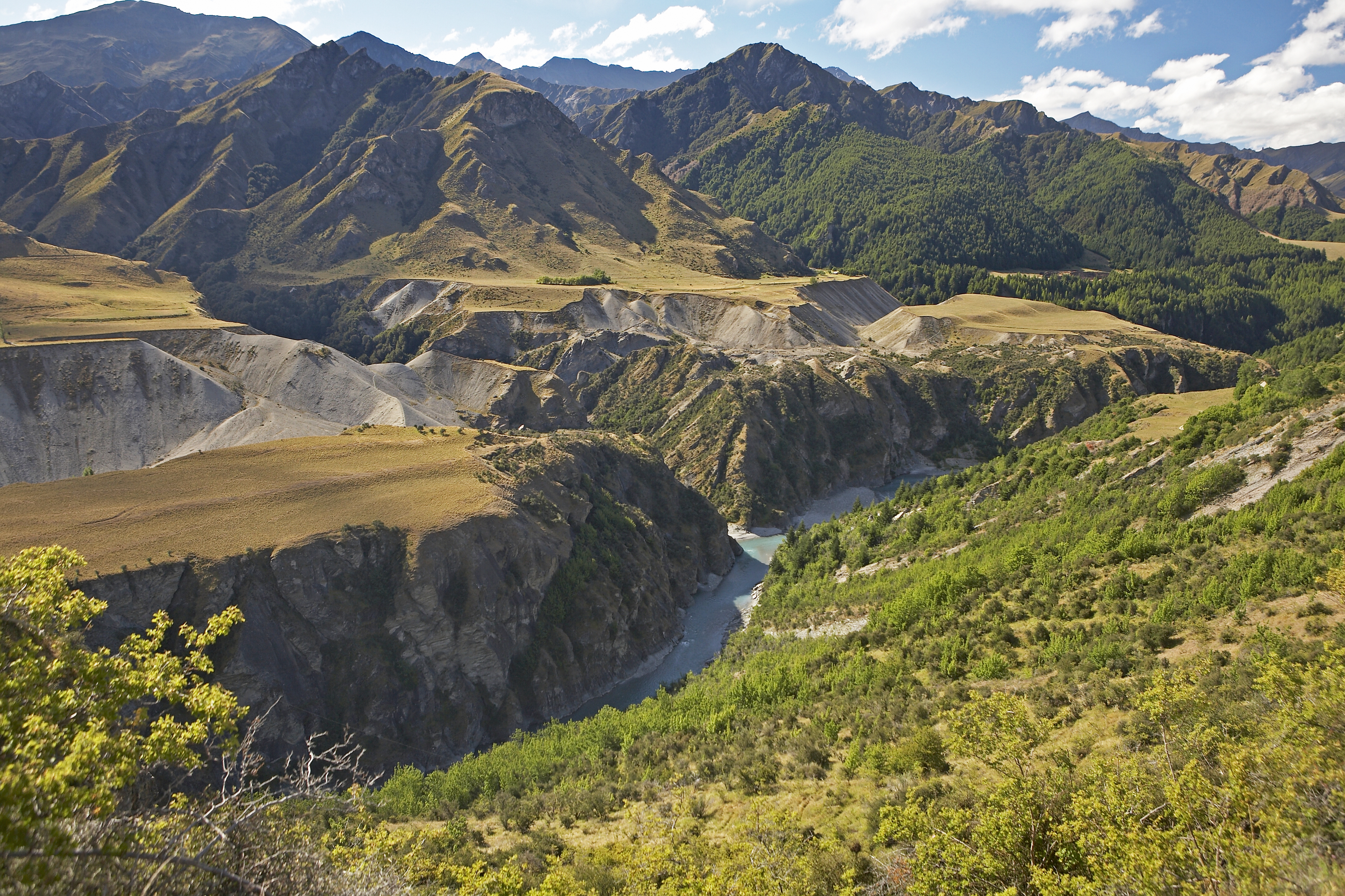
Skippers Canyon, New Zealand

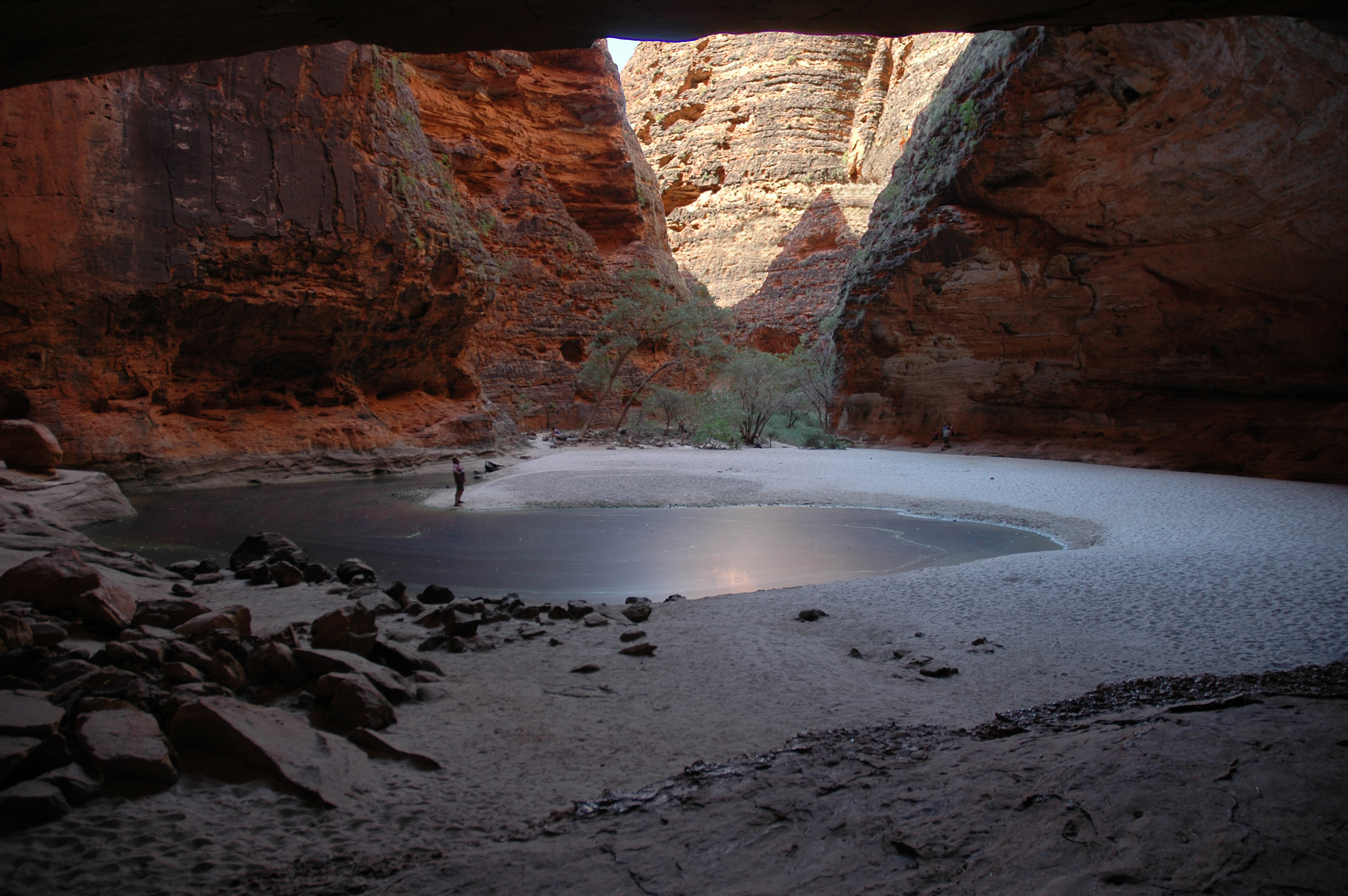
Cathedral Gorge, Purnululu National Park, Western Australia

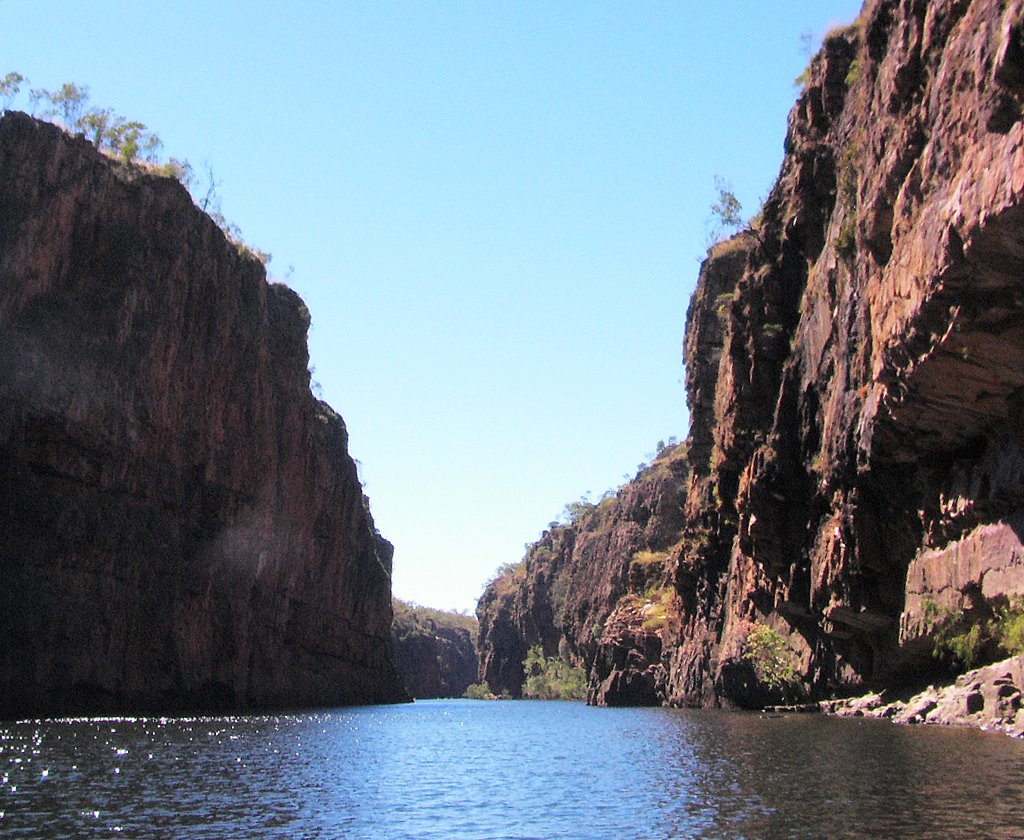
Katherine Gorge, Northern Territory of Australia

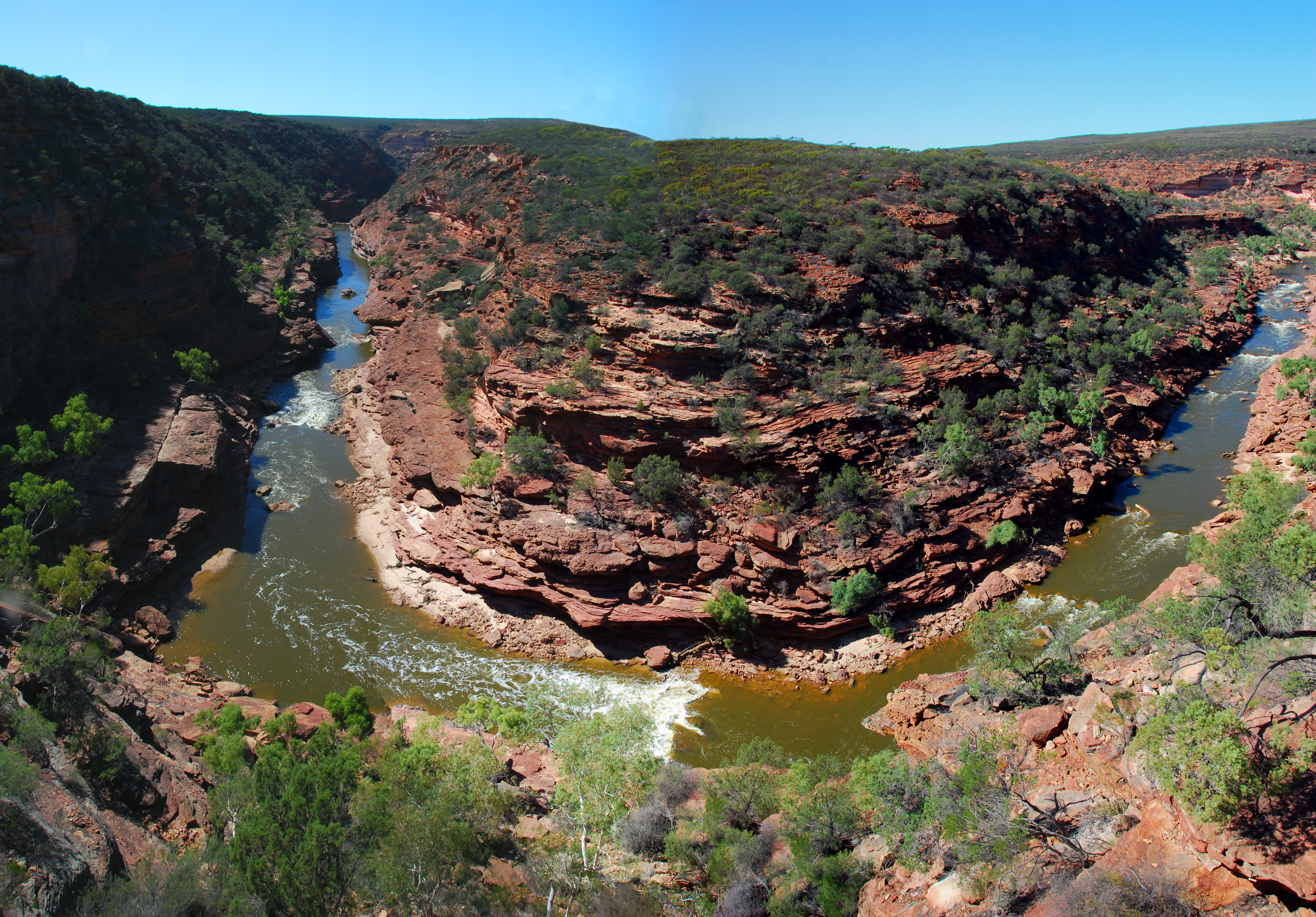
Murchison River Gorge, Western Australia

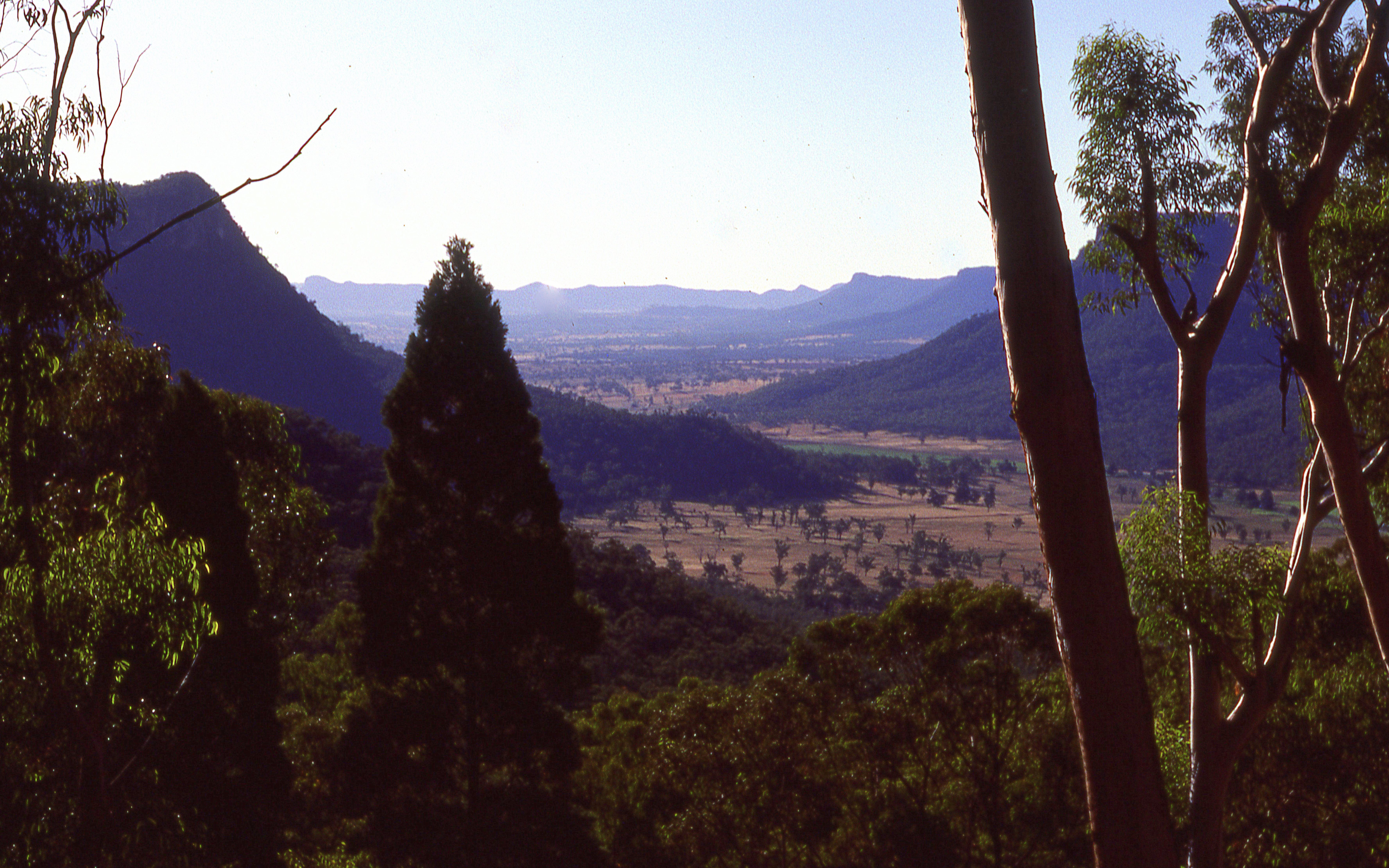
Capertee Valley, New South Wales

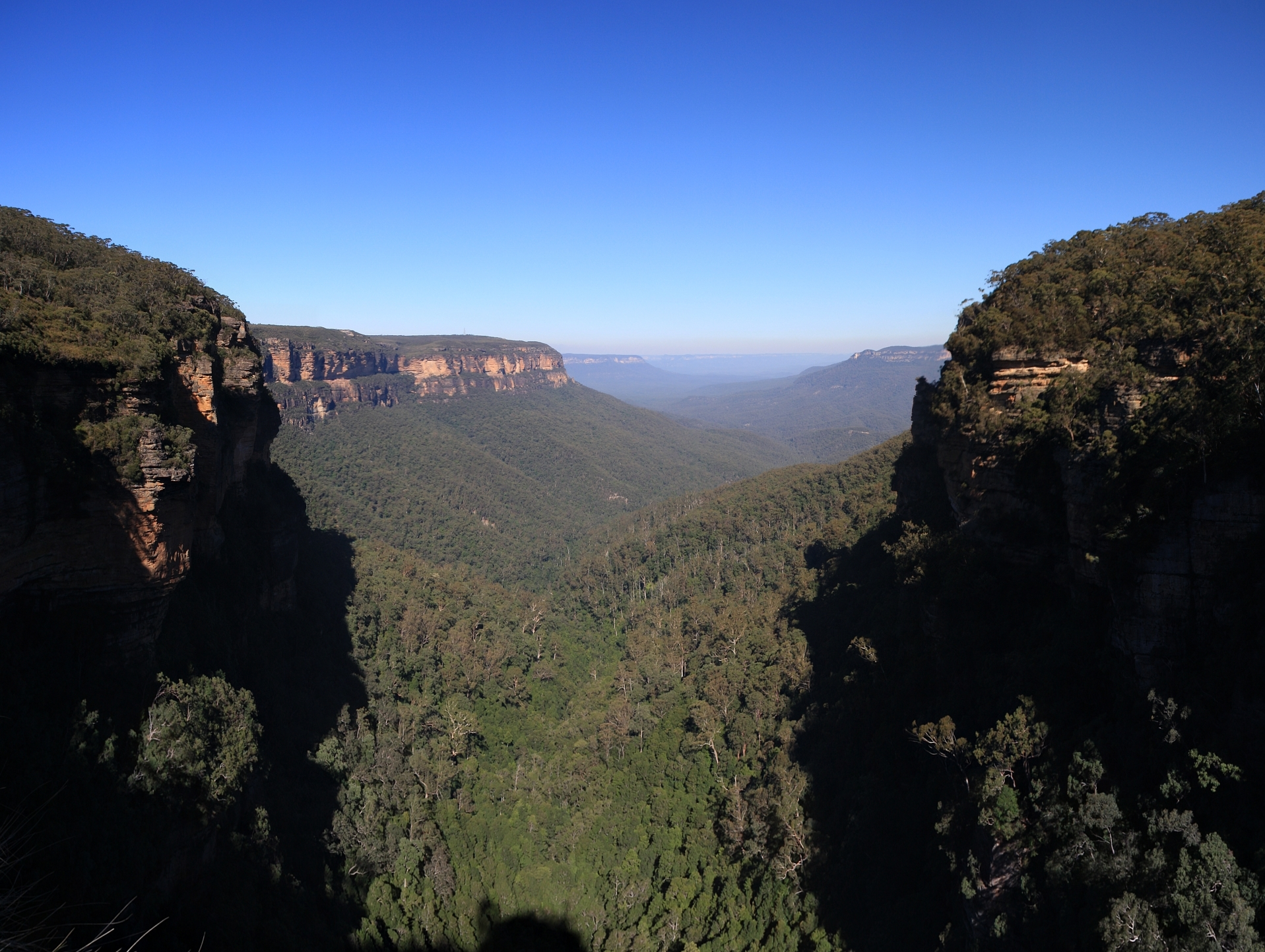
Jamison Valley, New South Wales

=== Australia ===
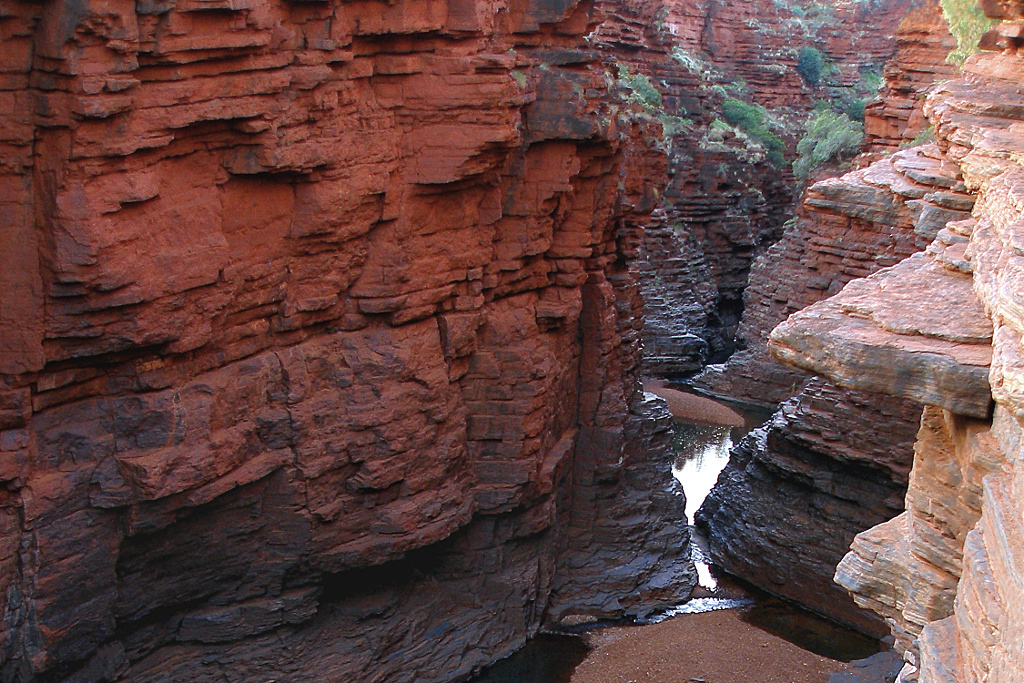
Joffre Gorge, Karijini National Park

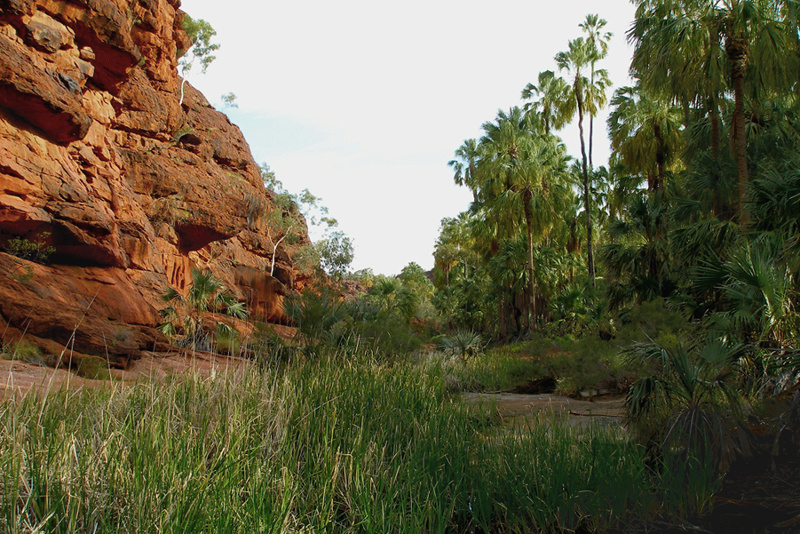
Palm Valley, Finke Gorge National Park

- Barfold Gorge, Victoria
- Barron Gorge, Queensland
- Bouldercombe Gorge, Queensland
- Cambanoora Gorge, Queensland
- Capertee Valley, New South Wales
- Carnarvon Gorge, Queensland
- Cataract Gorge, Tasmania
- Dimond Gorge, Western Australia
- Galston Gorge, New South Wales
- Geikie Gorge National Park, Western Australia
- Jamison Valley, New South Wales
- Karijini National Park, Western Australia—contains gorges named Dales, Hamersley, Hancock, Joffre, Kalamina, Knox, Munjina, Range, Red, Weano, Wittenoom and Yampire; blue asbestos exists in the latter two gorges
- Katherine Gorge, Northern Territory
- Kings Canyon, Northern Territory
- Lerderderg Gorge, Victoria
- Little River Gorge, Victoria
- Loch Ard Gorge, Victoria
- Mossman Gorge, Queensland
- Murchison River Gorge, Western Australia
- Nepean Gorge, New South Wales
- North and South Gorges of North Stradbroke Island, Queensland
- Palm Valley, Northern Territory
- Porcupine Gorge, Queensland
- Purnululu National Park, Western Australia—Cathedral and Piccaninny Gorges, and Echidna Chasm
- Ravine des Casoars, South Australia
- Sturt Gorge, South Australia
- West MacDonnell National Park, Northern Territory
- Windjana Gorge, Western Australia

=== New Zealand ===
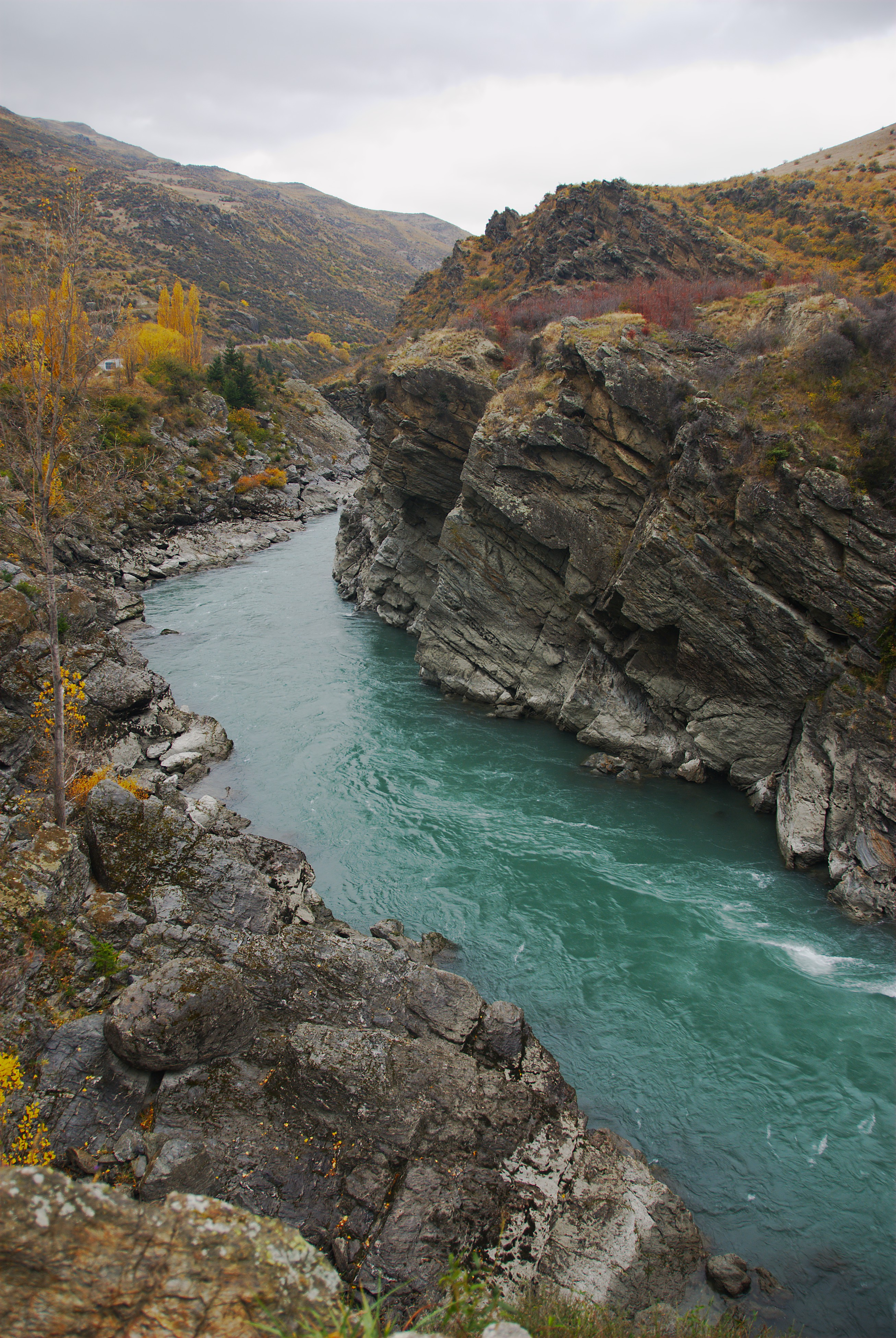
Kawarau Gorge

- Ashley Gorge, Canterbury region
- Buller Gorge, Buller
- Cromwell Gorge, Central Otago
- Karangahake Gorge, Coromandel Peninsula
- Karapoti Gorge, Wellington Region
- Kawarau Gorge, Central Otago
- Manawatū Gorge, Manawatū
- Ngauranga Gorge, Wellington City
- Poolburn Gorge, Central Otago
- Rakaia Gorge, Canterbury Region
- Skippers Canyon, Central Otago
- Taieri Gorge, South Otago
- Trotters Gorge, North Otago
- Waimakariri Gorge, Canterbury Region
- Weka Pass, Canterbury Region
- Windy Canyon, Great Barrier Island

== Submarine canyons ==
A submarine canyon is a steep-sided valley with nearly vertical walls cut into the seabed of the continental margin, sometimes extending well onto the continental shelf.

=== Atlantic Ocean ===
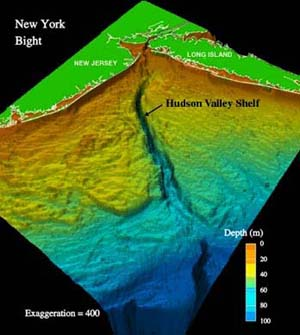
Model of Hudson Canyon, off the coast of New York and New Jersey

- Amazon Canyon, extending from the Amazon River off the coast of Brazil
- Avilés Canyon, off the coast of Asturias, Spain
- Baltimore Canyon, off the coast of Maryland
- Congo Canyon, extending from the Congo River off the coast of the Democratic Republic of the Congo
- Great Bahama Canyon, between the islands of The Bahamas
- Hatteras Canyon, off the coast of North Carolina
- Hudson Canyon, extending from the Hudson River off the coast of New York City between the Long Island and the New Jersey coasts of the United States
- Mona Canyon, off the coast of western Puerto Rico
- Nazaré Canyon, off the coast of Portugal
- Whittard Canyon, off the southwest coast of Ireland
- Wilmington Canyon, off the coast of Delaware, the United States

=== Indian Ocean ===
- Ganges Canyon, extending from the Ganges off the coast of India
- Indus Canyon, extending from the Indus River off the coast of Pakistan
- Perth Canyon, extending from the Swan River off the coast of Fremantle. Western Australia

=== Pacific Ocean ===
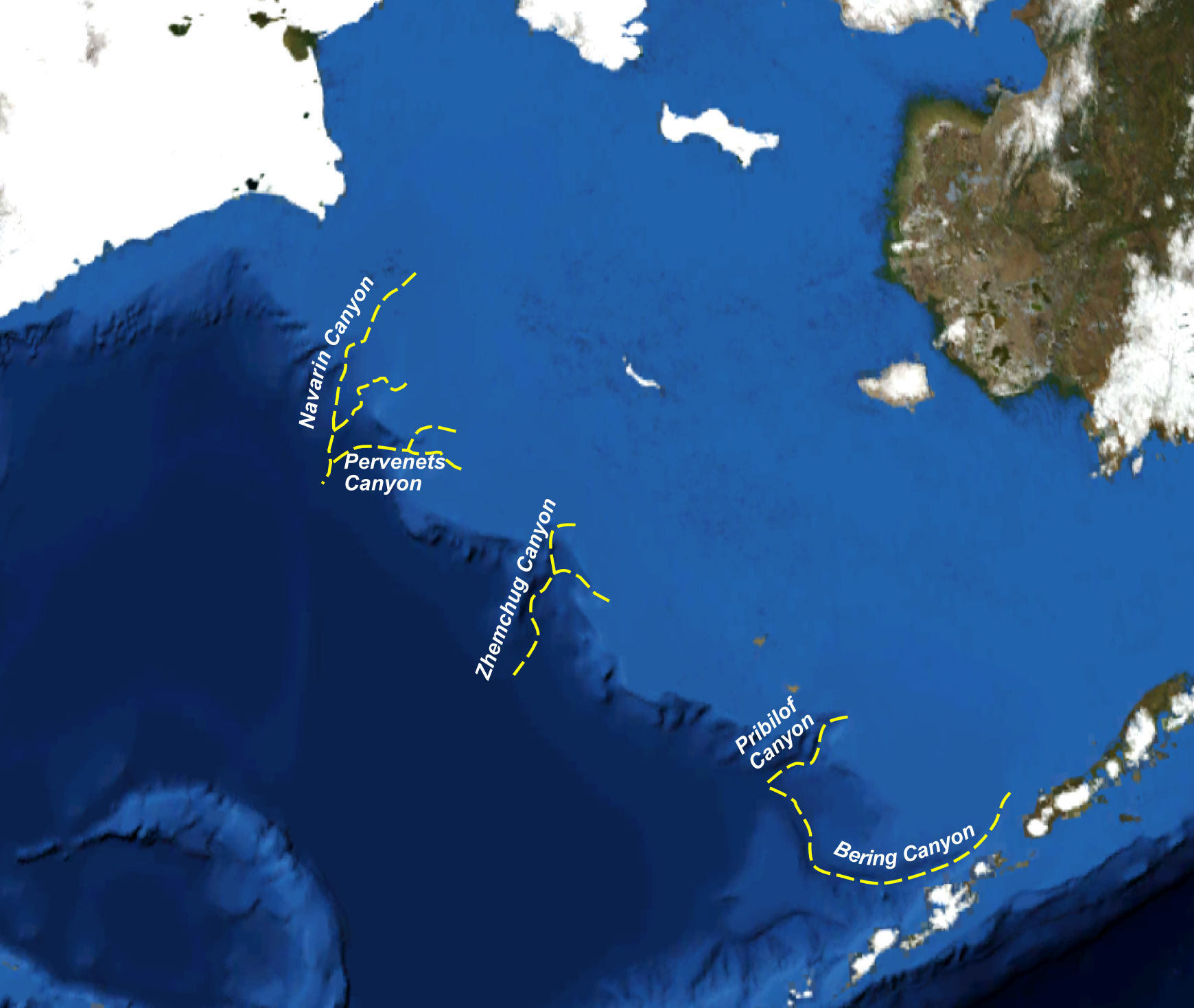
Map of Bering Canyon and four other submarine canyons in the Bering Sea

- Bass Canyon, in the Tasman Sea off the coast of eastern Victoria, Australia
- Bering Canyon, in the Bering Sea near the Aleutian Islands, Alaska, the United States
- Kaikōura Canyon, off the coast of the Kaikōura Peninsula, New Zealand
- La Jolla Canyon, off the coast of La Jolla, California
- Monterey Canyon, off the coast of central California, the United States
- Pribilof Canyon, in the Bering Sea, southeast of the Pribilof Islands, Alaska
- Scripps Canyon, off the coast of La Jolla, southern California
- Zhemchug Canyon, in the central Bering Sea between the Aleutian Islands of Alaska and the Kamchatka Peninsula of Russia; the largest submarine canyon in the world based on drainage area

=== Black Sea ===
- Danube Canyon, off the coast of Romania
