= Fort George Canyon Provincial Park =

Provincial park in British Columbia, Canada

- IUCN category II (national park)
- Location within British Columbia
- Interactive map of Fort George Canyon Provincial Park
- Location: Cariboo Land District, British Columbia, Canada
- Nearest city: Prince George, BC
- Coordinates: 53°40′54″N 122°43′30″W
- Area: 178 ha (440 acres)
- Established: June 29, 2000
- Governing body: BC Parks

Fort George Canyon Provincial Park is a provincial park south of Prince George in British Columbia, Canada. The park's area is 440 acres (180 ha) and includes part of the Fraser River. No camping, campfires, swimming, kayaking, horses, pets, or rock climbing are allowed. Skiing, fishing, and hunting are allowed.

== See also ==
- Steamboats of the Upper Fraser River in British Columbia
- Fraser Canyon
- Grand Canyon of the Fraser
- Giscome Canyon
