= Beggerlay Canyon =

Coordinates: 57°56′00″N 129°38′00″W

Beggerlay Canyon is a canyon on the Stikine River in northwestern British Columbia, Canada, located northeast of the communities of Iskut, British Columbia and Eddontenajon Lake.
