= The Green Bowl (British Columbia) =

Gorge in British Columbia, Canada

Coordinates: 54°45′10″N 121°10′25″W

The Green Bowl is a gorge just southeast of Kinuseo Falls at the north end of Monkman Provincial Park in the Northern Rockies of British Columbia, Canada, northeast of the city of Prince George and south of the community of Tumbler Ridge.

A grazing pasture surrounded by gorge walls, the Green Bowl is described in its British Columbia Geographical Names Information System entry as:

"The Green Bowl was a place of serenity and beauty. Each end narrowed to a rock cleft which could be sealed off by poles to prevent the horses wandering. A stream flowed throughout its length widening to a pond near the middle. Sixty foot rock cliffs lined it on both sides. It was approximately 1/2 mile long." (December 1979 letter from Guy Moore to Geographical Names Secretariat, Ottawa, file M.2.54).

== Name origin ==
So-named by Isobel McNaught Perry of Beaverlodge, Alberta, some years before the building of the Monkman Pass Highway 1937-39 (from: "People of the Pass", published by Beaverlodge & District Historical Association, 1988).
