= Fjaðrárgljúfur =

Canyon in Iceland

Coordinates: 63°46′16.5″N 18°10′19″W

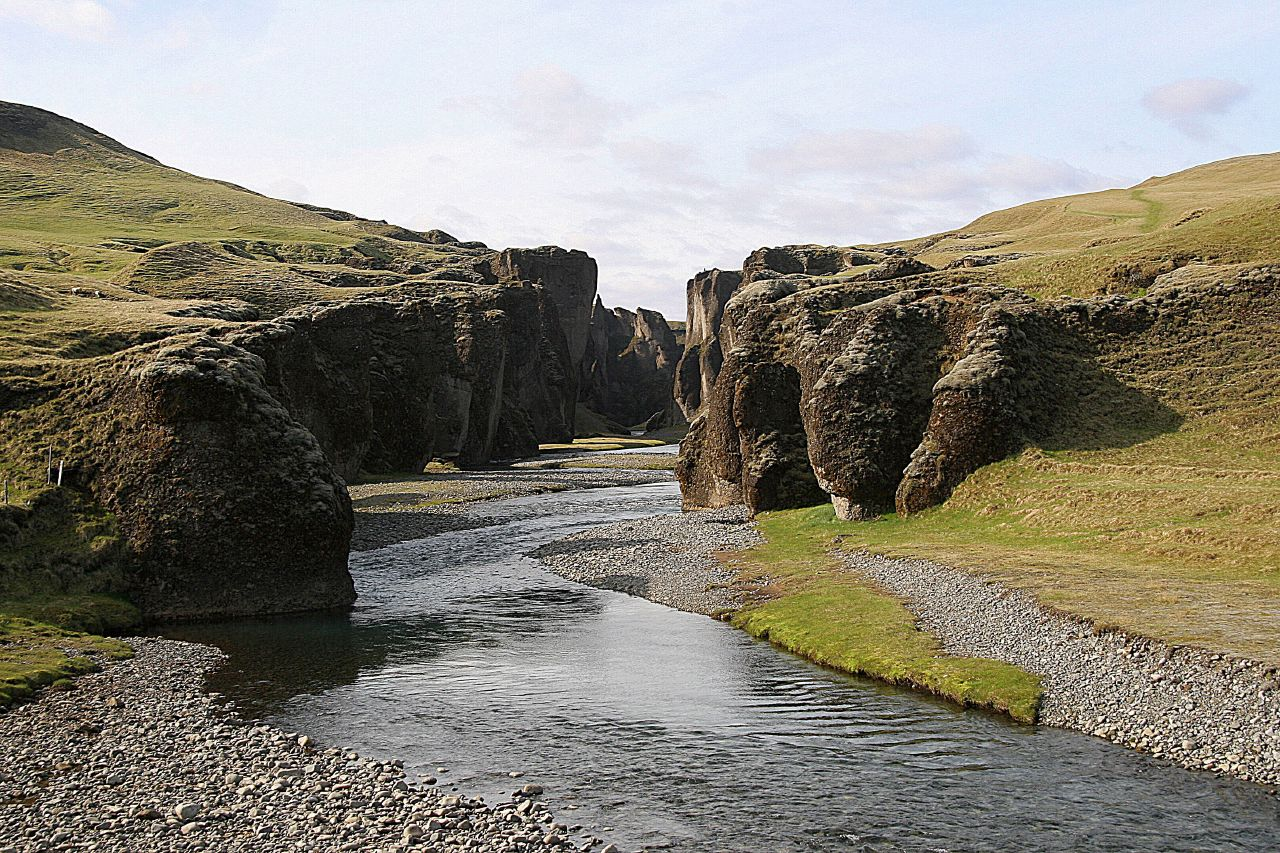
Fjaðrárgljúfur

Fjaðrárgljúfur (pronounced [ˈfjaðrˌaurˌkljuː(v)ʏr̥], "feather river canyon") is a canyon in south east Iceland. The Fjaðrá river flows through it.

The canyon has steep walls and winding water. It is up to 100 m (330 ft) deep and about 2 kilometres (1.2 miles) long. It is located near the Ring Road, not far from the village of Kirkjubæjarklaustur.

Its origins dates back to the cold periods of the Ice Age, about two million years ago. The canyon was created by progressive erosion by flowing water from glaciers through the rocks and palagonite over millennia. A waterfall flows down the western side of the canyon, visible from an observation platform at the end of a one-mile hike up the eastern edge.

In May 2019, authorities closed the canyon to visitors after it appeared in the music video for Justin Bieber's "I'll Show You". The resulting stream of visitors threatened to damage the canyon's environment.

== Panorama ==
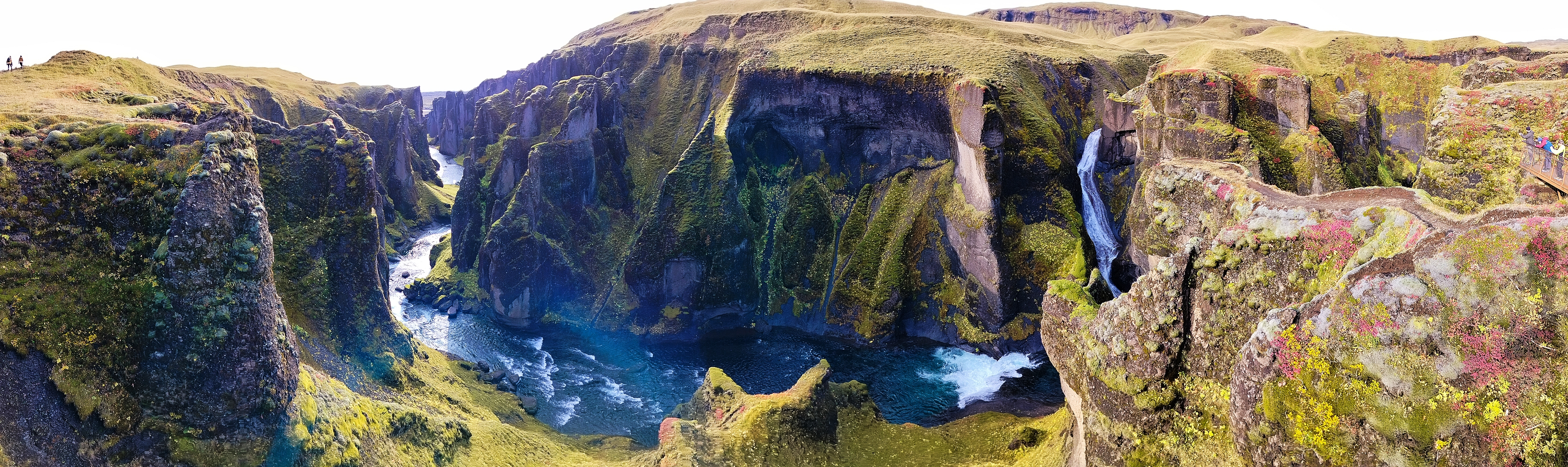
Wide angle panoramic view of Fjaðrárgljúfur
