= Sulak Canyon =

Canyon in Dagestan, Russia

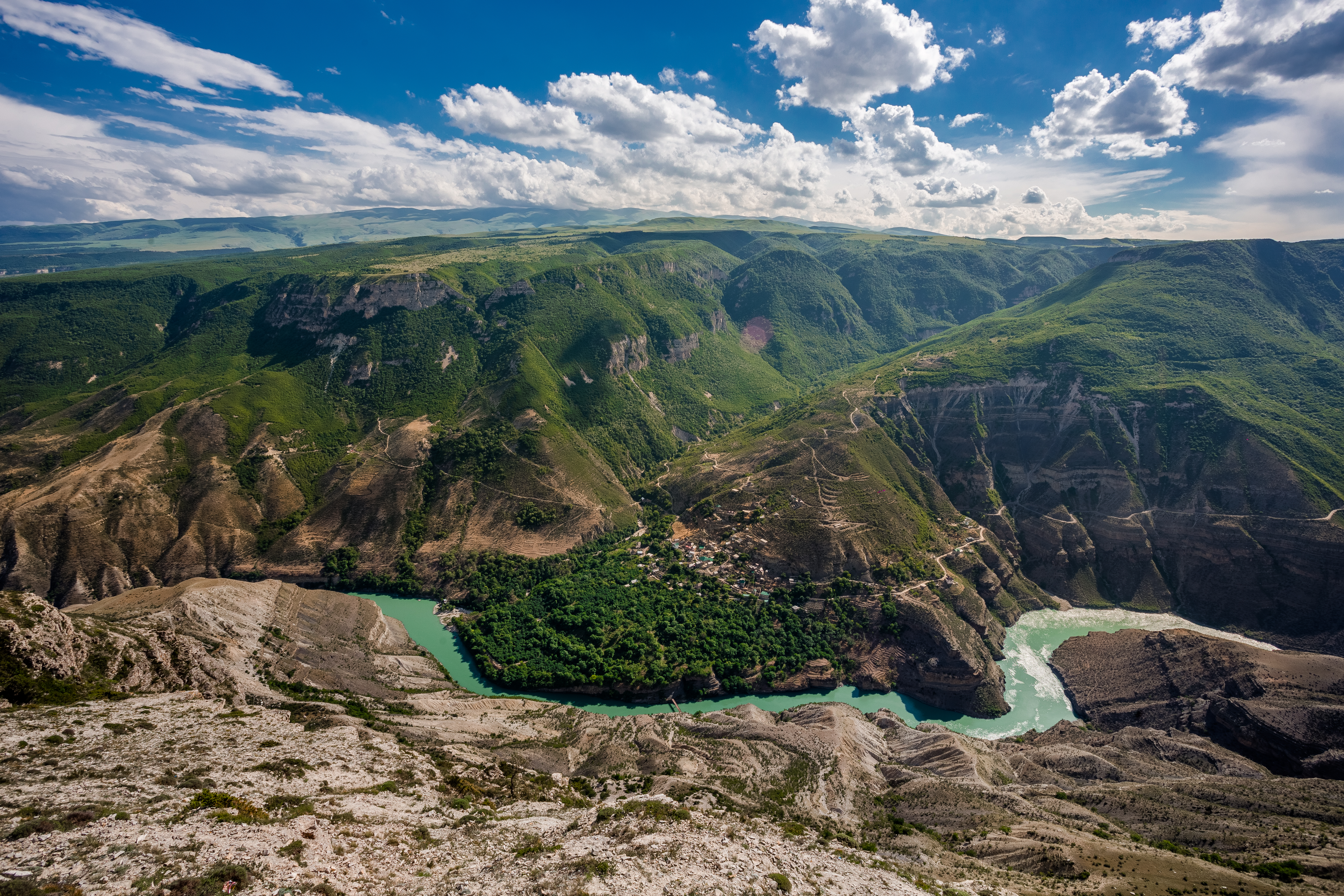
- The Sulak River flowing through the Sulak Canyon
- Floor elevation: approx. 1,920 metres (6,300 ft)
- Length: 53 kilometres (33 mi)

Geography
- Location: Dagestan, Russia
- Coordinates: 43°00′34″N 46°49′40″E
- Rivers: Sulak River
- Interactive map of Sulak Canyon

The Sulak Canyon (Avar: Сулахъ кӏкIал, Russian: Сулакский каньон) is a steep-sided deepest canyon in Europe carved by the Sulak River in Dagestan, Russia. The Sulak Canyon is 53 kilometres (33 mi) long, and attains a depth of over a mile (1,920 meters or 6,300 feet). It is 63 meters deeper than the Grand Canyon in the US and 620 meters deeper than the Tara River Canyon in Balkans. It is a tourist attraction in Dagestan.

== Geography ==
The canyon is the result of erosion which exposes one of the most complete geologic columns on the planet. Within this natural site, sediments of the Cretaceous, Jurassic and Tertiary periods come to the surface, in each of which ancient fossils are found. The Sulak canyon is located in the central part of Dagestan, in the valley of the Sulak river, some 100 km away from Makhachkala.

== Flora and fauna ==
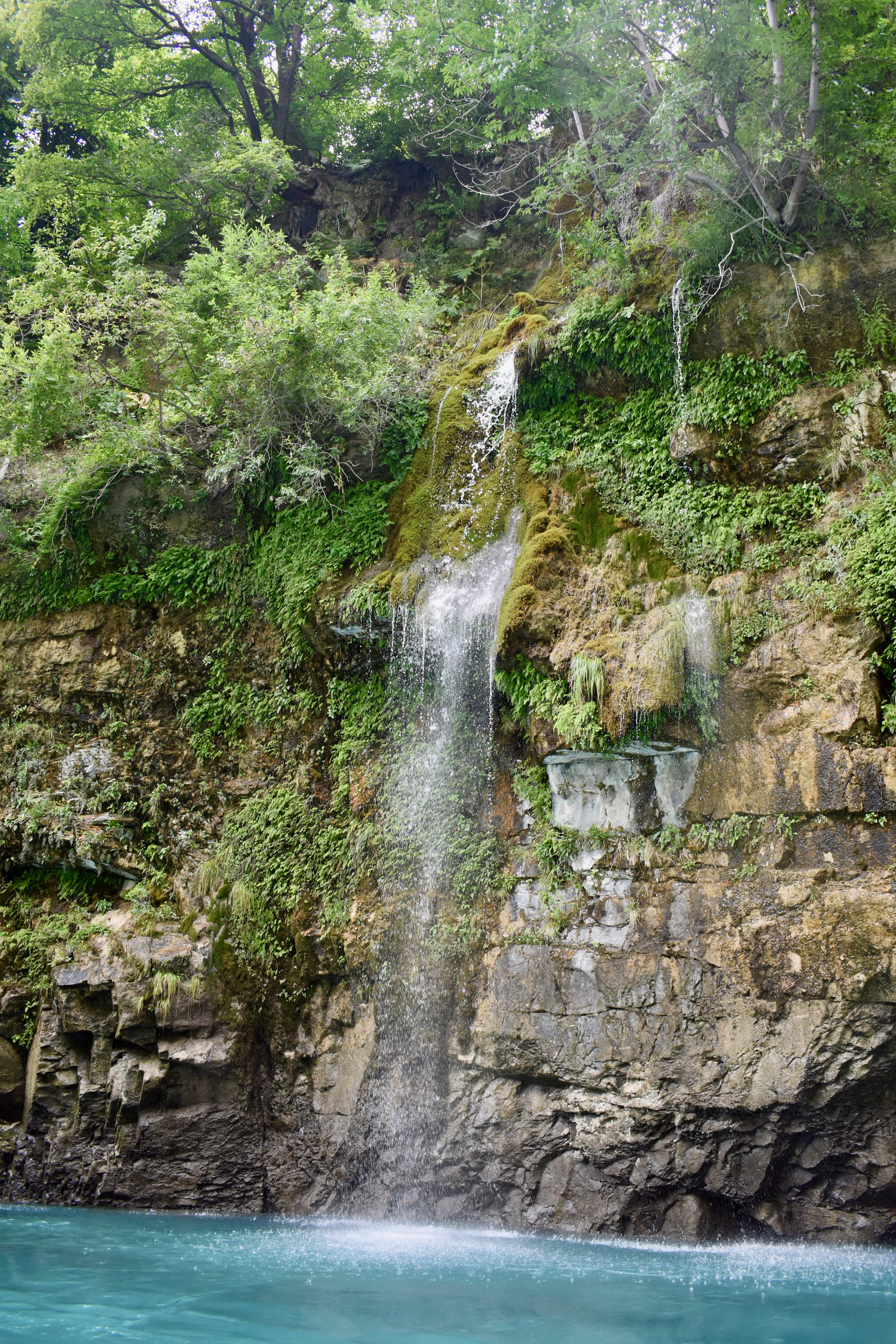
Waterfall and flora in the canyon

The Sulak canyon is the largest nesting settlement in the Russian Federation of rare vulture birds listed in the Red Data Book, such as griffon vultures and black vultures.

=== Plants ===
Some endemic, rare and poorly studied plant species, such as, horned sainfoin, have survived on the territory of the canyon.
