= Giscome Canyon =

Valley in British Columbia, Canada

Coordinates: 54°15′00″N 122°22′00″W

Giscome Canyon is a canyon on the Fraser River in the northern Central Interior of British Columbia, Canada, upstream from the city of Prince George near Tay Creek and at the southern end of the route known as the Giscome Portage.

== See also ==
- Fraser Canyon
- Grand Canyon of the Fraser
