= AAAAA Tourist Attractions of China =

Highest level in rating categories

AAAAA, or 5A (Chinese: 国家5A级旅游景区; pinyin: Guójiā Wǔ "A" jí Lǚyóu Jǐngqū), is the highest level in the rating categories used by the Ministry of Culture and Tourism. It is awarded to the most important and best-maintained tourist attractions in the People's Republic of China. As of 2025, there are 359 tourist attractions listed as 5A.

== History ==
The origins of the rating system for tourist attractions are based on criteria first set out in 1999 and revised in 2004 by the China National Tourism Administration (the predecessor to the current Ministry of Culture and Tourism). Criteria include quality and management factors like ease of transportation links, site safety, cleanliness, etc., and the uniqueness and recognition of sightseeing offers. Tourist attractions were graded according to the criteria on a scale initially from A to AAAA, with AAAAA added on later as the highest rating. A group of 66 tourist attractions was certified as the first set of AAAAA rated tourist attractions in 2007. The first batch included many of the most iconic historical sites in China, including the Forbidden City and Summer Palace. Additional batches of sites have been added, including 20 new 5A sites in February 2017. On rare occasions, locations have been downgraded from AAAAA for deficiencies in visitor experience.

== List ==
=== Beijing ===
Prefecture	Name	Date of inclusion	Description	Image
Beijing	Forbidden City ("Palace Museum")	2007	A .72 km^{2} compound of 980 buildings, initially constructed by the Yongle Emperor from 1406 to 1420, used as the main palace of the Ming and early Qing dynasties, converted into a public museum in 1925. Its southern Gate of Heavenly Peace (Tian'anmen) displays a famous portrait of Mao Zedong and has been the scene of numerous important events in modern Chinese history, including the 1 October 1949 celebration of the founding of the PRC and the Tian'anmen Square protests of 1989.	
Beijing	Temple of Heaven	2007	A 2.73 km^{2} compound of 92 buildings, initially constructed by the Yongle Emperor in 1420, used for the traditional worship of Heaven during the Ming and Qing dynasties, converted into a public park in 1918.	
Beijing	Summer Palace	2007	A 2.97 km^{2} compound surrounding Longevity Hill and Kunming Lake, initially constructed by the Qianlong Emperor from 1750 to 1764 to represent other famous sites of China and Chinese mythology in miniature, used as the unofficial main palace for the rest of the Qing, infamously razed by European troops in 1860 during the Second Opium War, rebuilt by the empress dowager Cixi and a center of late Qing government, damaged and looted by foreigners again in 1900 during the Boxer Rebellion, converted into a public park in 1924, and extensively restored since 1953.	
Beijing	Badaling and Mutianyu Great Wall	2007	A 3,741 m section of the Great Wall initially constructed in 1505 to protect the Juyong Pass, restored after 1952, and opened to tourists in 1958. It has received scores of foreign leaders, most notably US president Richard Nixon during his 1972 visit.	
Beijing	13 Ming Tombs	2011	A 34.35 km^{2} necropolis constructed between 1409 and 1644 at the foot of Tianshou Mountain, used as the resting place for 13 of the 16 emperors of the Ming.	
Beijing	Prince Gong Mansion ("Prince Kung's Mansion")	2012	A 6 ha (15 acre) compound with an expansive garden, initially constructed in 1777 by the Qianlong Emperor's notoriously corrupt official Heshen, used as a residence for members of the imperial family including the diplomat Yixin during the rest of the Qing, repurposed as the women's campus of Fu-Jen Catholic University under the Republic and as residences for leaders of the Ministry of Public Security under the People's Republic, restored after 1982, and opened as a museum in 1996. It is one of the few surviving Qing palaces, out of the 74 still used by imperial princes at the fall of the empire.	
Beijing	Olympic Green	2012	An 11.59 km^{2} Olympic Park constructed for the 2008 summer games, now featuring the Bird's Nest stadium, the National Indoor Stadium, the Water Cube aquatics center, the Olympic Forest Park, and national science & technology and the ethnic museums.	
Beijing	Old Summer Palace	2020	An 8 kilometres (5.0 mi) northwest of the walls of the former Imperial City section of Beijing. Constructed throughout the 18th and early 19th centuries, the Old Summer Palace was the main imperial residence of Qianlong Emperor of the Qing dynasty and his successors, and where they handled state affairs; the Forbidden City was used for formal ceremonies. Widely perceived as the pinnacle work of Chinese imperial garden and palace design, the Old Summer Palace was known for its extensive collection of gardens, its building architecture and numerous art and historical treasures. It was reputed as the "Garden of Gardens" (万园之园; 萬園之園; wàn yuán zhī yuán) in its heyday.	
Beijing	Grand Canal Cultural Tourism Scenic Area	2024		

=== Tianjin ===
Prefecture	Name	Date of inclusion	Description	Image
Tianjin	Guwenhua Jie ("Ancient Culture Street")	2007	A 560 m street lined with imitation Qing shops opened in 1986, selling traditional wares and snacks beside Mazu and Taoist temples (originally dating to 1326 and 1368, respectively) and a folklore museum.	
Tianjin	Mount Pan ("Panshan Scenic Area")	2007	A 105 km^{2} forest park surrounding 850 m Mount Pan, whose temples were first built in AD 25 during the Han. The four surviving temples include a 13-story dagoba and have all been renovated since the 1990s.	

=== Hebei ===
Prefecture	Name	Date of inclusion	Description	Image
Qinhuangdao	Shanhai Pass ("Shanhaiguan Scenic Area")	2007	A cluster of fortifications which once guarded the 10 km Shanhai Pass between Horn Mountain in the Yan chain and the Bohai Gulf, protecting "China Proper" from Manchuria, initially constructed in 583 during the early Sui dynasty and taking most of its present form from Xu Da's work in 1381 during the early Ming, when it became the eastern end of the Great Wall. Its strategic importance made it the site of numerous major events, most famously the 1644 battle that directly led to the establishment of the Qing.	
Baoding	Baiyang Lake ("Lake Baiyandian")	2007	The largest lake in northern China, although growing urban and agricultural water use after 1950 reduced its size from more than 1000 km^{2} to almost nothing in the 1980s. It is presently composed of 143 smaller lakes around 366 km^{2} and is used for nature tourism, but its size is now maintained by unsustainable use of highly polluted groundwater.	
Chengde	Chengde Mountain Resort ("Imperial Summer Resort and the Surrounding Temples")	2007	A 6.1 km^{2} compound initially constructed from 1703 to 1792 during the Qing, with an imperial summer resort surrounded by areas of mountains, plains, and lakeshore mimicking China's overall topography, serving as a culmination of traditional Chinese gardening and an influence on landscape gardening worldwide. The palace was a particular favorite of the Kangxi and Qianlong emperors, and its intermixed ethnic architectural styles consciously affirmed their government's commitment to a multicultural state, and it.	
Baoding	Yesanpo National Park	2011	A 334.8 km^{2} park at the intersection of the Taihang and Yan chains, comprising three main scenic areas—the Baili Gorge, the Longmentian Pass, and Fodongta Peak with Yugu Cave.	
Shijiazhuang	Xibaipo	2011	A village including a museum and other memorials reconstructing its role as the headquarters of the Chinese Communist Party and People's Liberation Army in late 1948 and early 1949, an important period of the Chinese Civil War. (The original sites are underwater as a result of local hydroelectric projects.)	
Tangshan	Eastern Qing Tombs	2015	A 78 km^{2} necropolis of 508 buildings constructed between 1661 and 1908 in a hollow of Changrui Mountain, used as the resting place of 5 emperors of the Qing, as well as the dowager empress Cixi.	
Handan	Nüwa Imperial Palace ("Wahuang Palace")	2015	A 1.7 km^{2} compound beside Phoenix Mountain (Fenghuangshan) honoring the goddess Nüwa, who temples were first built under the Han. The surviving palaces and temples were initially constructed under the Wanli Emperor of the Ming, were restored in the 1990s, and include one of China's most impressive rock carvings: 130,000 characters of Buddhist scripture engraved into the mountains from the Northern Qi onward.	
Handan	Guangfu Ancient City	2017	A 1.5 km^{2} town in the center of Yongnian Marsh, first settled during the Spring and Autumn period and serving as the capital of Dou Jiande's and Liu Heita's short-lived principalities of "Xia" and "Handong" during the late Sui, with city walls initially constructed under the Tang and modern construction mimicking the town's appearance under the Ming. It has museums to locals Yang Luchan and Wu Yuxiang, the founders of the two largest schools of tai chi.	
Baoding	Mount Baishi ("Whitestone Mountain; Scenic Area")	2017	A forest park surrounding 2096 m Mount Baishi, the northern end of the Taihang Mountains and site of the 1937 Battle of the Great Wall during the 2nd Sino-Japanese War.	
Baoding	Western Qing tombs	2020		
Chengde	Jinshanling Great Wall	2020		
Tangshan	Nanhu Kailuan Scenic Area	2024		
Hengshui	Hengshui Lake	2024		

=== Shanxi ===
Prefecture	Name	Date of inclusion	Description	Image
Datong	Yungang Grottoes	2007	An 8.5 km^{2} area of 252 caves in the Wuzhou Mountains with 51,000 niches filled with Buddhist statues and 18,000 m^{2} of carved wall space, initially constructed under the Northern Wei in the 5th & 6th century, expanded by the Liao in the 11th, and restored since 1952. There is also a ruined Ming fortress and beacon tower over the caves.	
Xinzhou	Mount Wutai	2007	A 423.12 km^{2} area surrounding the five peaks of Mount Wutai (3,061 m), considered holy since at least the Han (1st century AD), the site of imperial pilgrimage since the Northern Wei (5th century), and the seat of the Buddhist bodhisattva Manjushri (Wenshu) since the 7th century, and now hosting 53 monasteries in architecture spanning over a thousand years, including a timber hall from the Tang.	
Jincheng	House of the Huangcheng Chancellor	2011	A 10 ha (25 acre) walled estate with 9 gates, 19 gardens, and 640 rooms, initially constructed in 1633 for Chen Changyan and expanded in 1703 for Chen Tingjing, tutor to the Kangxi Emperor and chief editor of the Kangxi Dictionary.	
Jinzhong	Mount Mian	2013	A 75 km^{2} area surrounding the peak of Mt Mian (2,440 m), considered holy since at least the Spring and Autumn period (8th–5th centuries BC), most famed as the scene of Jie Zhitui's supposed immolation by Duke Chong'er of Jin c. 636 BC and thus the home of China's Cold Food and Tomb-Sweeping Festivals, the site of imperial pilgrimage since the Tang (7th century), when Li Shimin won an important victory nearby and constructed a temple for the Princess Changzhao to retire to as a Buddhist nun.	
Jinzhong	Pingyao ("Pingyao Ancient City")	2015	A 2.25 km^{2} walled town of about 4000 buildings in central Shanxi, first protected by earthen ramparts c. 800 BC, thoroughly reconstructed and fortified c. 1370 under the early Ming, serving as the financial center of the region from the 16th century and of the entire Qing Empire during the late 19th century. The town exemplifies Ming & Qing urban planning, with over a hundred streets and lanes lined with 17th–19th century shops criss-crossing the town. Organized restorations have been undertaken periodically since the 15th century, the most recent phase beginning in 1979. The World Heritage Site also includes the nearby Shuanglin and Zhenguo Temples.	
Xinzhou	Yanmen Pass Scenic Area	2017	A cluster of fortifications which once guarded the 1 km Yanmen Pass beside Mt Gouzhu, protecting "China Proper" from the nomads of the Eurasian steppe, initially constructed around 306 BC during the Warring States period and taking most of its present form from Lu Ting's work in 1374 during the early Ming, when it formed part of the "inner" line of the Great Wall. Its strategic importance made it the site of numerous major events, most famously the 980 battle which formed an important element in the Chinese legends, plays, &c. about Yang Ye and the other Generals of the Yang Family.	
Linfen	Locust tree of Hongdong Scenic Area	2018		
Changzhi	Huguan Taihang Grand Canyon and Baquan Gorge	2020		
Linfen	Mount Yunqiu	2020		
Linfen	Hukou Waterfall	2022		
Taiyuan	Jinci and Mount Tianlong	2024		

=== Inner Mongolia ===
Prefecture	Name	Date of inclusion	Description	Image
Ordos	Xiangshawan	2011	Desert resort	
Ordos	Mausoleum of Genghis Khan	2011	A 225 km^{2} area surrounding a compound of 4 buildings constructed between 1954 and 1956 to house relics used in the veneration of Genghis Khan, Tolui, and their wives since the Yuan, repurposed as a salt depot in 1968, restored in the early 1980s, and now the world center of Genghis Khan's cult, despite having only replicas after its desecration during the Cultural Revolution. The site also includes an expansive prairie, an equestrian sports center, a hot air balloon area, and a village showcasing traditional Mongolian culture.	
Hulunbuir	Manzhouli China-Russia; Border Tourist Area	2016	The area includes the Matryoshka Resort, a cultural resort with a matryoshka theme, and National Gate Resort, a huge border gate with an observation deck at the top for visitors to overlook the border area between China and Russia. Other attractions at the scenic area include the No 41 Border Monument, Locomotive Square and the historical site of the 6th National Congress of the Chinese Communist Party held in 1928.	
Hinggan League	Mount Arxan and Chaihe River scenic area	2017	An amalgam of the Arxan National Forest Park and Geopark, the Zhalantun Scenic Area, and Rose Peak.	
Chifeng	Ashatu Stone Formation	2018		
Alxa League	Populus euphratica Tourist Area	2020		
Hulunbuir	Hulunbuir Grassland and Morgele River Scenic Area	2024		
Hohhot	Laoniuwan Yellow River Canyon Scenic Area	2024		

=== Liaoning ===
Prefecture	Name	Date of inclusion	Description	Image
Shenyang	Shenyang Botanical Garden	2007		
Dalian	Tiger Beach Ocean Park	2007		
Dalian	Golden Pebble Beach	2011		
Benxi	Benxi Shuidong National Park	2015	Benxi Water Caves	
Anshan	Qianshan National Park	2017		
Panjin	Red Beach Scenic Area	2020		
Benxi	Wunü Mountain	2024		

=== Jilin ===
Prefecture	Name	Date of inclusion	Description	Image
Changchun	Museum of the Imperial Palace of Manchukuo	2007		
Baishan	Changbai Mountains	2007		
Changchun	Jingyuetan National Forest Park	2011		
Changchun	Changchun Movie Wonderland	2015		
Yanbian	Mount Liuding	2015		
Changchun	Changchun World Sculpture Park	2017		
Tonghua	Goguryeo Heritage Sites	2019		
Songyuan	Qianguo Chagan Lake Scenic Area	2024		
Baicheng	Da'an Nenjiangwan Scenic Area	2024		

=== Heilongjiang ===
Prefecture	Name	Date of inclusion	Description	Image
Harbin	Sun Island	2007	One of the main exhibition areas for ice sculptures during the Harbin International Ice and Snow Sculpture Festival.	
Heihe	Wudalianchi	2011		
Mudanjiang	Jingpo Lake	2011	Has received a serious warning from the Ministry of Culture and Tourism	
Yichun	Stone Forest Scenic Area	2013	Located within the Tanwanghe National Park.	
Daxing'anling	Arctic Village	2015		
Jixi	Hutou Scenic Area	2020		
Qiqihar	Zhalong Nature Reserve	2024		

=== Shanghai ===
Prefecture	Name	Date of inclusion	Description	Image
Shanghai	Oriental Pearl TV Tower	2007		
Shanghai	Shanghai Wild Animal Park ("Shanghai Wildlife Park")	2007		
Shanghai	Shanghai Science & Technology Museum	2010		
Shanghai	Sites of the National Congress of the Chinese Communist Party (1st, 2nd and 3rd)	2021		
Shanghai	Xisha Pearl Lake Scenic Area	2024		

=== Jiangsu ===
Prefecture	Name	Date of inclusion	Description	Image
Nanjing	Sun Yat-sen Mausoleum	2007	Located on Purple Mountain	
Wuxi	CCTV Wuxi Film/TV Studio	2007		
Suzhou	Classical Gardens of Suzhou (Humble Administrator's Garden, Lingering Garden and Tiger Hill)	2007 (Humble Administrator's Garden); 2010 (Lingering Garden and Tiger Hill)		
Suzhou	Zhouzhuang	2007	Located on Kunshan	
Wuxi	Ling Shan Grand Buddha	2010		
Nanjing	Fuzimiao and Qinhuai River	2010		
Yangzhou	Slender West Lake	2010		
Suzhou	Tongli	2010		
Changzhou	Oriental Jurassic Park	2010		
Taizhou	Qin Lake Scenic Area	2012		
Suzhou	Jinji Lake	2012	Located in Suzhou Industrial Park	
Nantong	Hao River	2012		
Zhenjiang	Three Mountains of Zhenjiang (Jinshan, Jiaoshan and Beigushan)	2012		
Wuxi	Yuantouzhu	2012		
Suzhou	Lake Tai	2012		
Changzhou	Tianmu Lake	2013		
Suzhou	Shajiabang and Yushan	2013		
Zhenjiang	Mount Mao	2014		
Huai'an	Former Residence of Zhou Enlai	2015		
Yancheng	Dafeng Milu Nature Reserve	2015		
Xuzhou	Yunlong Lake	2016		
Lianyungang	Mount Huaguo	2016		
Changzhou	Chunqiu Yancheng	2017		
Wuxi	Hui Shan Ancient Town	2020		
Lianyungang	Lian Island	2024		

=== Zhejiang ===
Prefecture	Name	Date of inclusion	Description	Image
Hangzhou	West Lake	2007		
Wenzhou	Yandang Mountains	2007		
Zhoushan	Mount Putuo	2007		
Hangzhou	Qiandao Lake	2010		
Ningbo	Xikou-Tengtou scenic spot	2010	Located in Fenghua	
Jiaxing	Wuzhen	2010		
Jinhua	Hengdian World Studios	2010	Located in Dongyang	
Jiaxing	South Lake	2011		
Hangzhou	Xixi National Wetland Park	2012		
Shaoxing	Lu Xun Native Place	2012		
Quzhou	Root Palace Buddhist Cultural Tourism Zone	2013	Located in Kaihua County	
Huzhou	Nanxun Old Town	2015	Located in Nanxun District	
Taizhou	Tiantai Mountain	2015		
Taizhou	Shenxianju	2015	Located in Xianju County	
Jiaxing	Xitang	2017		
Quzhou	Mount Jianglang and Nianbadu	2017		
Ningbo	Tianyi Ge and Moon Lake	2018		
Lishui	Xiandu	2020	Located in Jinyun County	
Taizhou	Walled City of Taizhou Fu	2022		
Lishui	Yunhe Terraces Scenic Area	2024		
Jinhua	Shuanglong Scenic Area	2024		

=== Anhui ===
Prefecture	Name	Date of inclusion	Description	Image
Huangshan	Huangshan ("Mount Huangshan Scenic Area")	2007		
Chizhou	Mount Jiuhua	2007		
Anqing	Mount Tianzhu	2011	Has received a serious warning from the Ministry of Culture and Tourism	
Huangshan	Xidi and Hongcun	2011		
Lu'an	Tiantangzhai	2012		
Xuancheng	Longchuan	2012		
Fuyang	Bali River	2013		
Huangshan	Huizhou Cultural Area	2014		
Hefei	Sanhe Ancient Town	2015		
Wuhu	Fantawild Adventure Wuhu	2016		
Lu'an	Wanfo Lake	2016		
Ma'anshan	Caishi Rock	2020		
Chuzhou	Mount Langya	2024		

=== Fujian ===
Prefecture	Name	Date of inclusion	Description	Image
Xiamen	Gulangyu	2007		
Nanping	Wuyi Mountains ("Mount Wuyi")	2007	Has received a serious warning from the Ministry of Culture and Tourism	
Zhangzhou; Longyan	Fujian Tulou	2011	Has received a serious warning from the Ministry of Culture and Tourism	
Sanming	Taining	2011		
Ningde	Baishuiyang	2012		
Quanzhou	Mount Qingyuan	2012		
Ningde	Mount Taimu	2013		
Fuzhou	Sanfang Qixiang	2015		
Longyan	Gutian	2015		
Putian	Meizhou Mazu Temple	2020		
Xiamen	Xiamen Botanical Gardens	2024		
Longyan	Mount Guanzhi	2024		

=== Jiangxi ===
Prefecture	Name	Date of inclusion	Description	Image
Jiujiang	Mount Lu	2007		
Ji'an	Jinggang Mountains	2007		
Shangrao	Mount Sanqing	2011		
Yingtan	Mount Longhu	2012		
Shangrao	Jiangwan Village	2013	Located in Wuyuan County.	
Jingdezhen	Ancient Kiln Folk Customs Museum	2013		
Yichun	Mingyue Mountain	2015		
Ganzhou	Cradle of the People's Republic of China	2015		
Fuzhou	Mount Dajue	2017		
Shangrao	Guifeng Peak	2017		
Nanchang	Pavilion of Prince Teng	2018		
Pingxiang	Wugong Mountains	2020		
Jiujiang	Mount Lu West Sea	2020		
Ganzhou	Mount Sanbai	2022		
Shangrao	Huangling	2024		

=== Shandong ===
Prefecture	Name	Date of inclusion	Description	Image
Yantai	Penglai Pavilion	2007		
Jining	Temple and Cemetery of Confucius and the Kong Family Mansion in Qufu	2007		
Tai'an	Mount Tai	2007		
Qingdao	Mount Lao	2011		
Yantai	Mount Nanshan	2011		
Weihai	Liugong Island	2011		
Zaozhuang	Taierzhuang Ancient Town	2013	Located in Tai'erzhuang District.	
Jinan	Baotu Spring	2013		
Linyi	Yimeng Mountain	2014	Located in Yishui County.	
Weifang	Qingzhou Ancient Town	2017		
Weihai	Huaxiacheng	2017	Quarry complex turned into a scenic area and tourist attraction. Received more than 2.3 million tourists in 2018.	
Dongying	Huanghekou	2020		
Linyi	Firefly Water Cave and Underground Grand Canyon Tourist Area	2020		
Jining	Weishan Lake	2022		
Qingdao	Olympic Sailing Marine Cultural Tourism Zone	2024		
Zibo	Zhoucun Ancient Commercial City	2024		

=== Henan ===
Prefecture	Name	Date of inclusion	Description	Image
Zhengzhou	Mount Song and Shaolin Monastery	2007		
Luoyang	Longmen Grottoes	2007		
Jiaozuo	Yuntai Mountain	2007		
Kaifeng	Qingming Riverside Landscape Garden	2011	Cultural theme park that recreates the painting Along the River During the Qingming Festival.	
Luoyang	Baiyun Mountain	2011		
Anyang	Yinxu	2011	Site of the archaeological discovery of oracle bones and oracle bone script, which resulted in the identification of the earliest known Chinese writing.	
Pingdingshan	Mount Yao and Spring Temple Buddha	2011		
Luoyang	Mount Laojun and Jiguan Cave	2012		
Luoyang	Longtan Grand Canyon	2013		
Nanyang	Laojieling and Xixia Dinosaur Relics Park	2014		
Zhumadian	Mount Chaya	2015		
Anyang	Red Flag Canal and Taihangshan Gorge	2016		
Shangqiu	Mount Mangdang	2017		
Xinxiang	Baligou Valley	2020		
Xinyang	Mount Jigong	2022		
Zhoukou	Taihao Fuxi Mausoleum Cultural Tourism Zone	2024		
Zhoukou	Baoquan Tourism Area	2024		

=== Hubei ===
Prefecture	Name	Date of inclusion	Description	Image
Wuhan	Yellow Crane Tower	2007		
Yichang	Three Gorges Dam	2007		
Shiyan	Wudang Mountains	2011		
Yichang	Three Gorges Tribes Scenic Area	2011		
Enshi	Shennong Stream	2011		
Shennongjia	Shennongjia Nature Reserve	2012		
Yichang	Qing River	2013		
Wuhan	East Lake	2013		
Wuhan	Huangpi Mulan Scenic Area	2014		
Enshi	Enshi Grand Canyon	2015		
Xianning	Chibi	2018		
Xiangyang	Longzhong	2020		
Enshi	Tenglong Cave	2020		
Yichang	Three Gorges Waterfall	2022		
Jingmen	Mingxian Mausoleum Cultural Tourism Scenic Area	2024		
Huanggang	Mount Guifeng	2024		

=== Hunan ===
Prefecture	Name	Date of inclusion	Description	Image
Hengyang	Mount Heng	2007		
Zhangjiajie	Wulingyuan and Tianmen Mountain	2007		
Yueyang	Yueyang Tower and Junshan Island	2011		
Xiangtan	Shaoshan	2011		
Changsha	Yuelu Mountain and Orange Isle	2012		
Changsha	Huaminglou Town	2014		
Chenzhou	Dongjiang Lake	2015		
Shaoyang	Mount Langshan	2016		
Zhuzhou	Yandi Mausoleum	2020		
Changde	Taohuayuan (Peach Garden)	2020		
Xiangxi	Aizhai, Shibadong, Dehang Waterfall Tourist Area	2021		
Xiangxi	Fenghuang Ancient Town Tourist Area	2024		

=== Guangdong ===
Prefecture	Name	Date of inclusion	Description	Image
Guangzhou	Chimelong Tourist Resort	2007		
Shenzhen	OCT	2007		
Shenzhen	Mission Hills Resort	2011		
Meizhou	Yannanfei Tea Fields	2011		
Guangzhou	Baiyun Mountain	2011		
Qingyuan	Lianzhou Underground River	2011		
Shaoguan	Mount Danxia	2012		
Foshan	Mount Xiqiao	2013		
Foshan	Changlu Park	2014		
Huizhou	Mount Luofu	2014		
Yangjiang	Dajiao Bay Maritime Silk Road Park	2015		
Zhongshan	Former Residence of Sun Yat-sen	2016	Located in Cuiheng Village, Nanlang Town	
Huizhou	Huizhou West Lake	2018		
Zhaoqing	Xinghu	2020		
Jiangmen	Kaiping Diaolou	2020		
Heyuan	Wanlv Lake Scenic Area	2024		

=== Guangxi ===
Prefecture	Name	Date of inclusion	Description	Image
Guilin	Li River	2007		
Guilin	Merryland World	2007		
Guilin	Jingjiang Princes' Palace	2012		
Nanning	Mount Qingxiu	2014		
Guilin	Two Rivers and Four Lakes Scenic Area	2017		
Chongzuo	Detian Waterfall	2018		
Baise	Memorial Park of Baise Uprising	2019	Site of the 1929–1931 Baise Uprising	
Beihai	Weizhou Island E'yu Mountain	2020		
Hezhou	Huangyao Ancient Town	2022		
Liuzhou	Chengyang Bazhai Scenic Area	2024		
Chongzuo	Huashan Rock Art	2024		

=== Hainan ===
Province	Prefecture	Name	Date of inclusion	Description	Image
Hainan	Sanya	Nanshan Buddhism Cultural Zone	2007		
Hainan	Sanya	Nanshan Daxiaodongtian	2007		
Hainan	Baoting	Yanoda Rainforest	2012		
Hainan	Lingshui	Boundary Island	2013		
Hainan	Baoting	Binglang Canyon Scenic Area	2015		
Hainan	Sanya	Wuzhizhou Island	2016		
Hainan	Sanya	Tianya Haijiao	2024		

=== Chongqing ===
Prefecture	Name	Date of inclusion	Description	Image
Chongqing	Dazu Rock Carvings	2007		
Chongqing	Small Three Gorges	2007		
Chongqing	Wulong Karst	2011		
Chongqing	Youyang Taohuayuan Scenic Area	2012		
Chongqing	Black Valley Scenic Area	2012		
Chongqing	Jinfo Mountain	2013	Jinfo Mountain is an isolated mountain with cliffs up to 300 m surrounding its relatively flat top, surrounded by forest. With its outstanding karst features and superb biodiversity, Jinfo Shan has been listed as a tentative World Heritage site since 2001.	
Chongqing	Simian Mountain	2015		
Chongqing	Longgang Geological Park	2017	Longgang Geological Park is characterized by peculiar landforms such as karst, deep karst caves, grasslands and stalagmites. The world's longest cantilever bridge can also be found here.	
Chongqing	Ayi River	2020		
Chongqing	Zhuoshui	2020		
Chongqing	Baidicheng and Qutang Gorge	2022		
Chongqing	Wuling Mountain Great Rift Valley Scenic Area	2024		

=== Sichuan ===
Prefecture	Name	Date of inclusion	Description	Image
Chengdu	Mount Qingcheng and the Dujiangyan Irrigation System	2007	Construction of the Dujiangyan irrigation system began in the 3rd century B.C. This system still controls the waters of the Minjiang River and distributes it to the fertile farmland of the Chengdu plains. Mount Qingcheng was the birthplace of Taoism, which is celebrated in a series of ancient temples.	
Leshan	Mount Emei	2007	The first Buddhist temple in China was built here in Sichuan Province in the 1st century A.D. in the beautiful surroundings of the summit Mount Emei. The addition of other temples turned the site into one of Buddhism's holiest sites. Over the centuries, the cultural treasures grew in number. Mount Emei is also notable for its exceptionally diverse vegetation, ranging from subtropical to subalpine pine forests. Some of the trees there are more than 1,000 years old.	
Ngawa	Jiuzhaigou	2007	Stretching over 72,000 ha in the northern part of Sichuan Province, the jagged Jiuzhaigou valley reaches a height of more than 4,800 m, thus comprising a series of diverse forest ecosystems. Its superb landscapes are particularly interesting for their series of narrow conic karst land forms and spectacular waterfalls. Some 140 bird species also inhabit the valley, as well as a number of endangered plant and animal species, including the giant panda and the Sichuan takin.	
Leshan	Leshan Giant Buddha	2011	The most remarkable is the Giant Buddha of Leshan, carved out of a hillside in the 8th century and looking down on the confluence of three rivers. At 71 m high, it is the largest Buddha in the world.	
Ngawa	Huanglong	2012	Situated in the north-west of Sichaun Province, the Huanglong valley is made up of snow-capped peaks and the easternmost of all the Chinese glaciers. In addition to its mountain landscape, diverse forest ecosystems can be found, as well as spectacular limestone formations, waterfalls and hot springs. The area also has a population of endangered animals, including the giant panda and the Sichuan golden snub-nosed monkey.	
Guang'an	Former Residence of Deng Xiaoping	2013	The Former Residence of Deng Xiaoping was built in the late Qing dynasty (19th century). It is located in Paifang Village of Xiexing Town, Guang'an District, Guang'an City. It has a building area of about 833.4 m2 (8,971 sq ft), embodies buildings such as the old houses, the statue of Deng Xiaoping, the Dezheng Place, the Cultural relics Exhibition Hall, the Hanlin Yard .	
Nanchong	The Ancient City of Langzhong	2013	Since 1985, the PRC government has awarded Langzhong with various accolades on three separate occasions. In 1986 the State Council named it a famous and historical town. In 1991, it was finally upgraded to county-level city status.	
Mianyang	Beichuan Qiang City Tourist Area	2013	Located in Beichuan Qiang Autonomous County, the tourist area is composed of ruins of the old Beichuan county seat, new Beichuan county seat, and Beichuan Earthquake Museum, etc.	
Ngawa	Wenchuan Special Tourist Area	2013	Wenchuan County is a county in Ngawa Tibetan and Qiang Autonomous Prefecture, Sichuan. The county was the site of the epicentre and one of the areas most severely hit by the 2008 Sichuan earthquake, also known as the Wenchuan earthquake.	
Guangyuan	Jianmen Pass Scenic Area	2015	Jianmen Pass is a mountain pass located southwest of the city of Guangyuan in Sichuan province. It has also been called "Jianmenguan Pass". The mountain pass was a part of the Shu Roads. The construction of the gate was related to the Three Kingdoms era strategist, Shu Han chancellor Zhuge Liang.	
Nanchong	Former Residence of Zhu De	2016	Zhu De's Former Residence was built in the late Qing dynasty (1644–1911). It is located in Linlang Village, Ma'an Town, Yilong County. It has a building area of about 2560 square meters, embodies buildings such as the old houses, the Zhu De Memorial Hall, the statue of Zhu De, the Cultural relics Exhibition Hall, and Lancao Garden.	
Garzê	Hailuogou Glacier Forest Park	2017	Hailuogou is a glacier national park located southeast of Ganzi Tibetan Autonomous Prefecture of Sichuan Province. It is by the east face of Mount Gongga(Miya Konka) at the east boundary of Eastern Tibetan Plateau. Inside this park there are hanging glaciers, hundreds of ice caves, giant icefalls and quiet forest. Among them the Great Icefall is 1000 meters’ long and 1100 meters’ wide. The glaciers locate by the elevation of around 2800 meters above sea level. The difference of plantations is massive between the base at Moxi and Camp 4 at the highest location of the park.	
Ya'an	Bifengxia	2020		
Garzê	Yading	2020		
Chengdu	Anren Ancient Town	2022		
Ngawa	Mount Siguniang Scenic Area	2024		
Chengdu	Mount Tiantai	2024		

=== Guizhou ===
Prefecture	Name	Date of inclusion	Description	Image
Anshun	Huangguoshu Waterfall	2007		
Anshun	Longgong National Park Scenic Area	2007		
Bijie	Baili Dujuan National Forest Park Scenic Area	2013		
Qiannan	Zhangjiang Scenic Area	2015		
Guiyang	Qingyan Ancient Town	2017	Originally built in the year 1378, during the Ming dynasty. Qingyan's pig's feet is a local delicacy found in the town. The pig's feet symbolize good luck. Located in Huaxi District.	
Tongren	Mount Fanjing	2018	The highest peak of the Wuling Mountains in southeastern China, at an elevation of 2,570 m (8,430 ft). Mount Fanjing (also known as Fanjingshan) is also a sacred mountain in Chinese Buddhism.	
Qiandongnan	Zhenyuan Old Town	2020		
Zunyi	Chishui Danxia	2020		
Bijie	Zhijin Cave	2022		
Qianxinan	Wanfenglin	2024		

=== Yunnan ===
Prefecture	Name	Date of inclusion	Description	Image
Kunming	Stone Forest	2007		
Lijiang	Jade Dragon Snow Mountain	2007		
Dali	Three Pagodas	2011		
Xishuangbanna	Xishuangbanna Tropical Botanical Garden	2011		
Lijiang	Old Town of Lijiang	2011		
Dêqên	Potatso National Park	2012	Located in Shangri-La	
Kunming	World Horti-Expo Garden	2016		
Baoshan	Tengchong Volcanic Scenic Area	2016		
Baoshan	Heshun Town	2024		

=== Tibet ===
Prefecture	Name	Date of inclusion	Description	Image
Lhasa	Potala Palace	2013	The 5th Dalai Lama started construction of the Patala Palace in 1645, and it served as the residence of the Dalai Lama until the 14th Dalai Lama fled to India during the 1959 Tibetan uprising. The palace consists of thirteen stories of buildings —containing over 1,000 rooms, 10,000 shrines and about 200,000 statues— that soar 117 metres (384 ft) on top of Marpo Ri, the "Red Hill", rising more than 300 metres (980 ft) in total above the valley floor.	
Lhasa	Jokhang Temple	2013	Located in Barkhor Square in Lhasa, the oldest part of the temple was built in 652 by Songtsen Gampo. Tibetans, in general, consider this temple as the most sacred and important temple in Tibet. The temple is currently maintained by the Gelug school, but they accept worshipers from all sects of Buddhism.	
Nyingchi	Tsozong Gongba Monastery	2017	A small Tibetan Buddhism monastery founded in the 1400s in the Nyingma tradition, it is located on Tashi Island in the middle of Pagsum Lake in the Nyenchen Tanglha Mountains	
Shigatse	Tashi Lhunpo Monastery	2017	Founded in 1447, it is a historic and culturally important monastery that is the traditional seat of the Panchen Lama. The monastery is located on a hill in the center of the city. The full name of the monastery in Tibetan means "all fortune and happiness gathered here."	
Nyingchi	Yarlung Tsangpo Grand Canyon	2020		

=== Shaanxi ===
Prefecture	Name	Date of inclusion	Description	Image
Xi'an	Huaqing Pool	2007		
Yan'an	Mausoleum of the Yellow Emperor	2007		
Xi'an	Mausoleum of the First Qin Emperor, Terracotta Army	2007	Terracotta Warriors and Horses Museum	
Weinan	Huashan	2011		
Xi'an	Giant Wild Goose Pagoda	2011		
Baoji	Famen Temple	2014		
Shangluo	Golden Gorge Scenic Area	2015		
Baoji	Mount Taibai	2016		
Xi'an	Xi'an City Wall and Stele Forest	2018		
Yan'an	Yan'an Revolutionary Scenic Area	2020		
Xi'an	Daming Palace	2020		
Yan'an	Hukou Waterfall	2022		
Yan'an	Qiankunwan Scenic Area	2024		
Xianyang	Qianling Mausoleum	2024		

=== Gansu ===
Prefecture	Name	Date of inclusion	Description	Image
Pingliang	Kongtong Mountains	2007		
Jiayuguan	Jiayu Pass	2007		
Tianshui	Maijishan Grottoes	2011		
Jiuquan	Singing Sand Dunes and Crescent Lake	2015		
Zhangye	Qicai Danxia	2020		
Linxia	Bingling Temple	2020		
Longnan	Guanegou	2022		
Gannan	Yeliguan	2024		

=== Qinghai ===
Prefecture	Name	Date of inclusion	Description	Image
Haibei	Qinghai Lake	2011		
Xining	Kumbum Monastery	2012		
Haidong	Huzhu Homeland Park	2017		
Haibei	Amidongsuo	2020		

=== Ningxia ===
Prefecture	Name	Date of inclusion	Description	Image
Zhongwei	Shapotou	2007		
Shizuishan	Shahu Lake Scenic Area	2007		
Yinchuan	Zhenbeipu West Film Art Center	2011		
Yinchuan	Shuidonggou	2015	The oldest known paleolithic site in China, and a section of the Great Wall.	
Wuzhong	Qingtongxia Yellow River Grand Canyon Tourist Area	2024		
Guyuan	Liupanshan Red Army Long March Tourist Area	2024		

=== Xinjiang ===
Prefecture	Name	Date of inclusion	Description	Image
Changji	Heavenly Lake of Tianshan ("Tianchi")	2007		
Turpan	Grape Valley	2007		
Altay	Kanas Lake ("Resort Kanasi Lake")	2007		
Ili	Nalati Grasslands	2011		
Altay	Koktokay National Geological Park	2012		
Kashgar	Jinhuyang Forest	2013		
Bayingolin	Bosten Lake	2014		
Ürümqi	Tianshan Grand Canyon	2014		
Kashgar	Old Kashgar	2015		
Ili	Kalajun Grassland	2016		
Bayingolin	Bayanbulak Grassland	2016		
Beitun	Baisha Lake	2017		
Kashgar	Pamir Tourism Area	2020		
Karamay	Devil's City	2020		
Bortala	Sayram Lake	2021		
Aral	Taklimakan 359 Brigade Cultural Tourism Zone	2021		
Changji	Jiangbulake Scenic Area	2022		
Aksu	Tianshan Tuomur Scenic Area	2024		

== Downgrading ==
Tourist sites found deficient by the China National Tourism Administration (merged into the Ministry of Culture and Tourism in 2018) have lost their 5A accreditation due to deficiencies in visitor experience. In 2015, Shanhai Pass in Hebei was the first tourist site to be downgraded from 5A. The next wave of downgrading occurred in 2016 with the removal of Orange Isle in Hunan and Shenlong Gorge in Chongqing for "security concerns, overpricing, poor environmental management and poor facility maintenance, as well as bad service mainly resulting from a lack of staff members."

Province	Prefecture	Name	Date of inclusion	Date of delisting	Description	Image
Chongqing	Chongqing	Shenlong Gorge	2013	2016		
Shanxi	Jinzhong	Qiao Family Compound	2014	2019	A 1.1 ha (2.6 acre) courtyard house comprising six large courtyards and 313 rooms built in the shape of a 囍, the character for "double happiness", initially constructed in 1755 for the tofu and tea merchant Qiao Guifa, rebuilt twice, including for the financier Qiao Zhiyong, converted into the Qixian Folk Museum in 1986, and the setting for Zhang Yimou's 1991 Raise the Red Lantern and over 40 other movies.	

== See also ==
- List of protected areas of China
- List of national parks of China
