= Boundary Island =

Boundary Island may refer to:

- Boundary Island (Hainan), China
- Boundary Island (Western Australia), Australia

== See also ==
- Boundary Islet straddles the border of the Australian states of Victoria and Tasmania
