= Huguan Taihang Grand Canyon =

Geographical feature in Shanxi, China

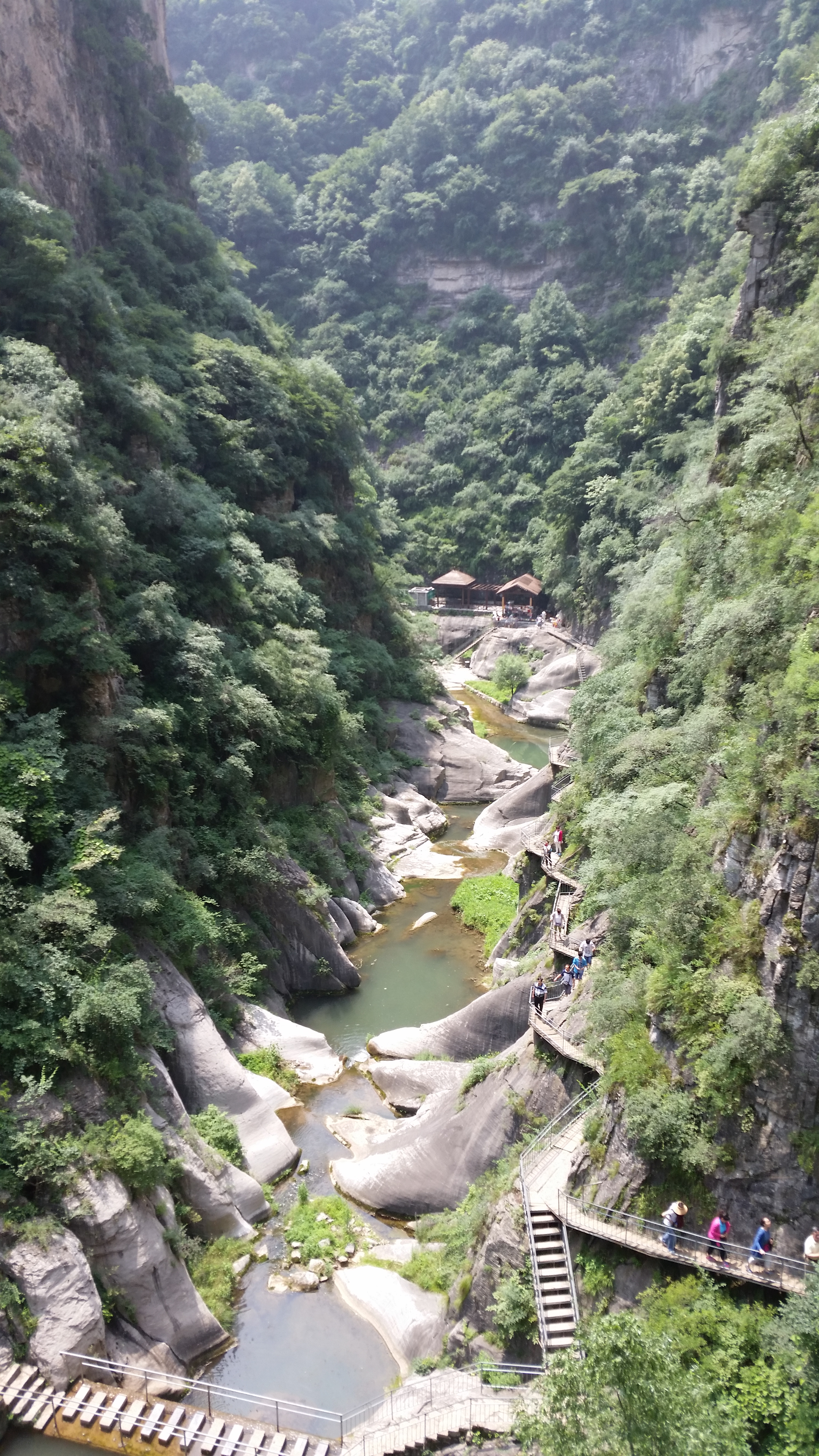
- Taihang Mountain Grand Canyon, Black Dragon Pond

- Location within Shanxi Location within China
- Area: 155.6 km^{2} (60.1 mi^{2})

Geography
- Location: Huguan, Shanxi, China
- Coordinates: 35.945264°N 113.561086°E
- Interactive map of Huguan Taihang Grand Canyon

Huguan Taihang Grand Canyon is a geographical feature and tourist attraction in Shanxi, China. It is one of the AAAAA Tourist Attractions of China, added to the list of AAAAA attractions in 2019. The area became a National Geopark in 2005.

The Taihang Grand Canyon Scenic Area attracts more than four million tourists every year, and is located in the eastern part of Huguan County, Shanxi Province, China. The scenic area has a total size of 155.6 square kilometres, and includes 5 main gorges (Hongdou Gorge, Qinglong Gorge, Baquan Gorge, Wangmang Gorge and Wuzhi Gorge). Another major feature and scenic spot is Wanfo Mountain.

The landforms in the area were formed relating to the uplift of the Taihang Mountains and associated river erosion, resulting in steep slopes and river valleys. The valleys slope from west to east. Terrain is steeper to the east, and becomes more gentle in the northwest. There are more than 3,400 ravines and gorges within the Geopark, and more than 150 peaks. These gorges include steep sections exceeding 100m in height. The maximum elevation within the Geopark is 1,822m.

Geologically, the deep gorges cut through carbonate rocks from the Palaeozoic. Yanshanian tectonics dominate, with faults mainly along the north-northeast direction. Lithology includes quartzite, mudstone, limestone and dolomite. Strata exposure includes the Changcheng System, Cambrian system, Ordovician system and Quaternary system along with local Yanshanian related diorite intrusions.

== Baquan Gorge ==
The Baquan (English translation: "Eight Springs") Gorge is located in the middle section of the Grand Canyon. The area is 24.11 square kilometers in size. The canyon was named after 8 streams of water that start at the same location within the canyon. The gorge includes Proterozoic red sandstone, and limestone and shale from the Paleozoic.
