= Baiyun Mountain =

Baiyun Mountain may refer to:

- Baiyun Mountain (Henan), Song County, Luoyang, Henan, China
- Baiyun Mountain (Guangdong), Guangzhou, Guangdong, China
- Baiyun Mountain (Fu'an), Fu'an, Fujian, China
