= Mount Laojun =

Mount Laojun may refer to:

- Mount Laojun (Henan), Henan, China
- Mount Laojun (Yunnan), Yunan, China
