= Huguan County =

Huguan County 壶关县 Hukwan
- County
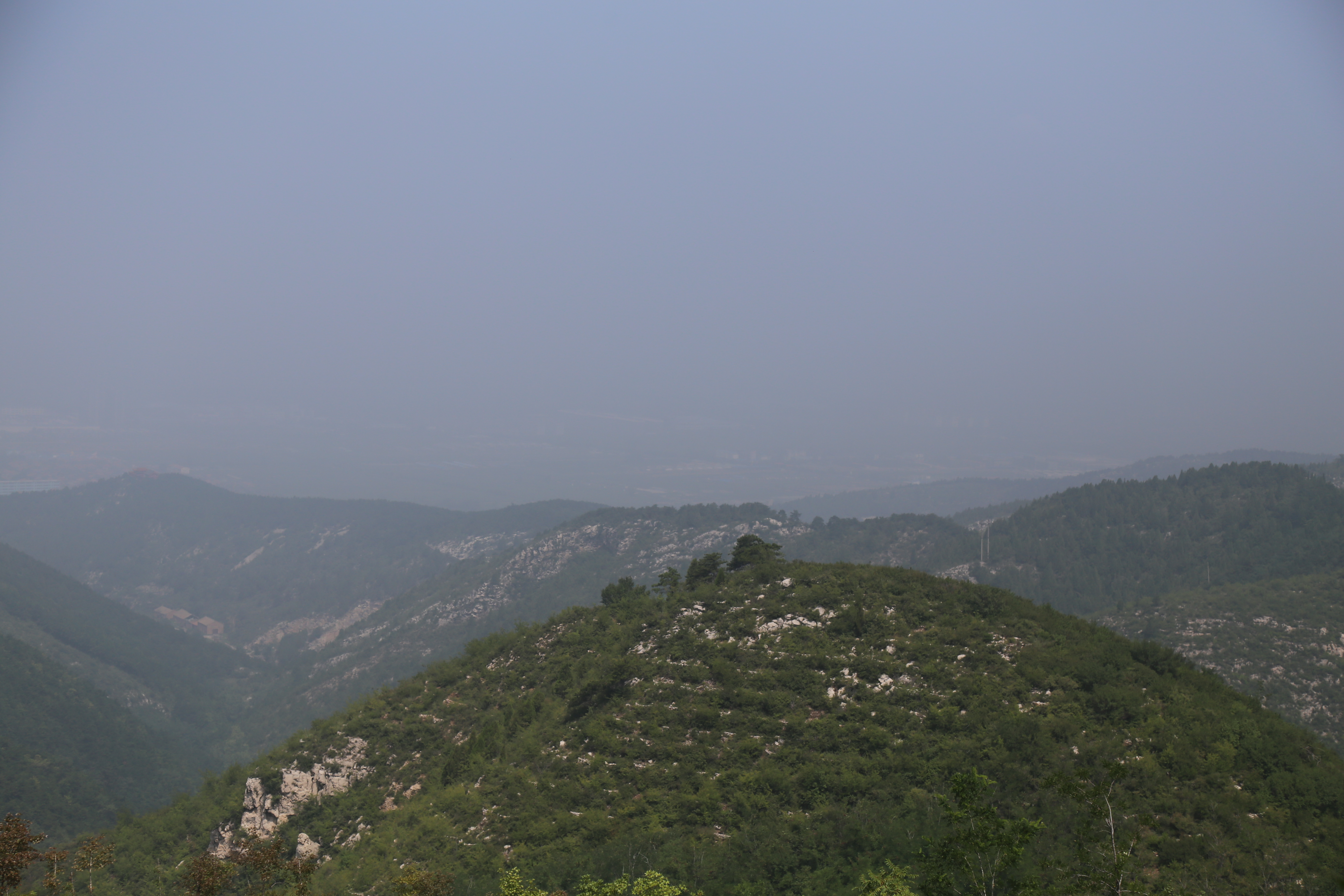

- Location of the seat in Shanxi
- Coordinates: 35.974°N 113.336°E
- Country: People's Republic of China
- Province: Shanxi
- Prefecture-level city: Changzhi

Population (2020)
  - Total: 240,109
- Time zone: UTC+8 (China Standard)

Huguan County (simplified Chinese: 壶关县; traditional Chinese: 壺關縣; pinyin: Húguān Xiàn) is a county in the southeast of Shanxi province, China. It is under the administration of Changzhi city.

Huguan county is the location of Huguan Taihang Grand Canyon, which is one of the AAAAA Tourist Attractions of China.

== Climate ==
Climate data for Huguan, elevation 1,122 m (3,681 ft), (1991–2020 normals, extremes 1981–2010)
Month	Jan	Feb	Mar	Apr	May	Jun	Jul	Aug	Sep	Oct	Nov	Dec	Year
Record high °C (°F)	16.3 (61.3)	22.7 (72.9)	28.4 (83.1)	34.3 (93.7)	36.9 (98.4)	37.1 (98.8)	36.7 (98.1)	34.1 (93.4)	34.4 (93.9)	28.8 (83.8)	24.1 (75.4)	17.9 (64.2)	37.1 (98.8)
Mean daily maximum °C (°F)	2.3 (36.1)	5.8 (42.4)	12.0 (53.6)	19.0 (66.2)	24.2 (75.6)	27.6 (81.7)	28.2 (82.8)	26.7 (80.1)	22.6 (72.7)	17.1 (62.8)	10.2 (50.4)	3.8 (38.8)	16.6 (61.9)
Daily mean °C (°F)	−4.9 (23.2)	−1.3 (29.7)	4.7 (40.5)	11.7 (53.1)	17.3 (63.1)	21.0 (69.8)	22.4 (72.3)	20.8 (69.4)	16.1 (61.0)	10.0 (50.0)	3.0 (37.4)	−3.2 (26.2)	9.8 (49.6)
Mean daily minimum °C (°F)	−10.1 (13.8)	−6.5 (20.3)	−1.0 (30.2)	5.1 (41.2)	10.6 (51.1)	14.9 (58.8)	17.6 (63.7)	16.3 (61.3)	11.0 (51.8)	4.6 (40.3)	−2.0 (28.4)	−8.0 (17.6)	4.4 (39.9)
Record low °C (°F)	−24.7 (−12.5)	−22.0 (−7.6)	−16.9 (1.6)	−6.5 (20.3)	−1.4 (29.5)	6.5 (43.7)	10.8 (51.4)	8.0 (46.4)	−0.5 (31.1)	−7.7 (18.1)	−20.5 (−4.9)	−24.0 (−11.2)	−24.7 (−12.5)
Average precipitation mm (inches)	5.5 (0.22)	10.3 (0.41)	11.0 (0.43)	30.0 (1.18)	54.6 (2.15)	81.8 (3.22)	137.0 (5.39)	115.9 (4.56)	56.6 (2.23)	34.0 (1.34)	17.4 (0.69)	5.1 (0.20)	559.2 (22.02)
Average precipitation days (≥ 0.1 mm)	3.8	4.2	4.6	6.4	8.3	10.8	14.6	12.5	9.2	6.8	5.0	3.0	89.2
Average snowy days	4.7	4.9	3.5	0.9	0	0	0	0	0	0.1	3.0	4.1	21.2
Average relative humidity (%)	57	57	52	51	53	62	76	78	74	68	63	57	62
Mean monthly sunshine hours	196.0	192.2	227.3	257.7	283.0	254.0	243.7	234.4	201.7	202.4	195.0	193.5	2,680.9
Percentage possible sunshine	63	62	61	65	65	58	55	57	55	59	64	64	61
Source: China Meteorological Administration
