= Nüwa Palace =

Temple complex in Hebei, China

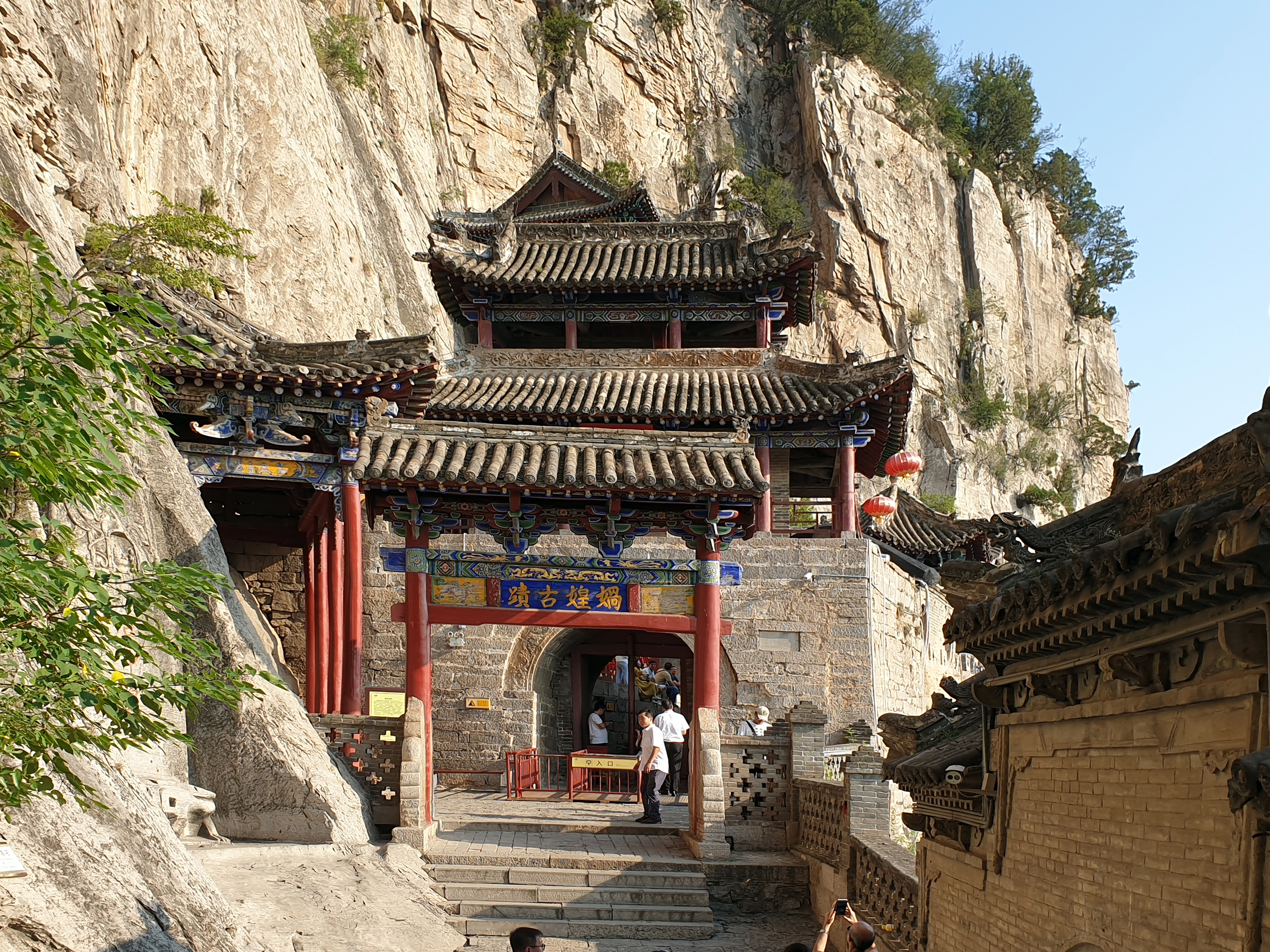
- Nüwa Palace Scenic Area
- Traditional Chinese: 媧皇宮及石刻
- Simplified Chinese: 娲皇宫及石刻
- Literal meaning: Empress Nüwa Palace and Rock Carvings
Transcriptions
Standard Mandarin
- Hanyu Pinyin: Wāhuáng gōng jí shíkè
- Wade–Giles: Wa Huang Kung chi Shih-k‘o

The Nüwa Palace, (Note: Similar forms of the name include the Palace of Nüwa and Temple of the Goddess Nüwa.) also known as Wahuang Palace and by its Chinese name Wahuanggong, is a compound of palaces and temples beside Phoenix Mountain (Fenghuangshan) in She County, Handan Prefecture, Hebei Province, China. It principally honors the Chinese goddess Nüwa, whom the ancient Chinese believed created mankind and repaired the sky in prehistoric times. As such, the location is treated as a kind of ancestral shrine of all humankind and sees increased pilgrimage on Tomb Sweeping Day. The scenic area now covers 2600 mu (1.67 km^{2} or 0.64 sq mi) and was made a AAAAA tourist attraction by China's National Tourism Administration in 2015.

== History ==
Later compendia record that the early Chinese believed that Nüwa created the world's various animals, making mankind from yellow earth on People's Day, the 7th day of the 1st month of the Chinese year. By the Warring States Period at the end of the Zhou (3rd century BC), the Chinese explained the Earth's axial tilt, the northwestern direction of celestial bodies, and the southeastern tendency of major Chinese rivers through a legend about a great water god or monster named Gonggong who damaged Mount Buzhou after losing a battle for leadership of the gods. Nüwa defeated him and his lieutenant Xiangliu, then repaired the sky using gems of five different colors and the four legs of the great sea tortoise Ao.

The Huainanzi compiled by Liu An's scholars in the early Han (2nd century BC) associated these stories with Ji Province, the area around the great plain north of the Yellow River. Temples honoring Nüwa were first built in the area around Phoenix Mountain by the end of the Han in the 2nd century AD, with the Chinese claiming the place was the site of Nüwa's acts of creation and repair. Extensive inscriptions of Buddhist scripture upon the mountain's rockface—now totaling 130,000 characters—began during the Northern Qi (6th century). The surviving palaces and temples seen today began to be erected under the Wanli Emperor of the Ming.

Presently, the site is treated as a kind of ancestral shrine for all humans, with especial attention between the 1st and 18th days of the 3rd month of the Chinese lunar calendar and on Tomb Sweeping Day. Nüwa Palace was named a nationally protected historical and cultural site by the State Administration of Cultural Heritage in 1996 and a AAAAA tourist attraction by China's National Tourism Administration in 2015.

== See also ==
- Chinese creation myths
- List of AAAAA-rated tourist attractions of the People's Republic of China
