= Xiamen Botanical Gardens =

Botanical garden in Fujian, China

Xiamen Botanical Garden
- 厦门市园林植物园
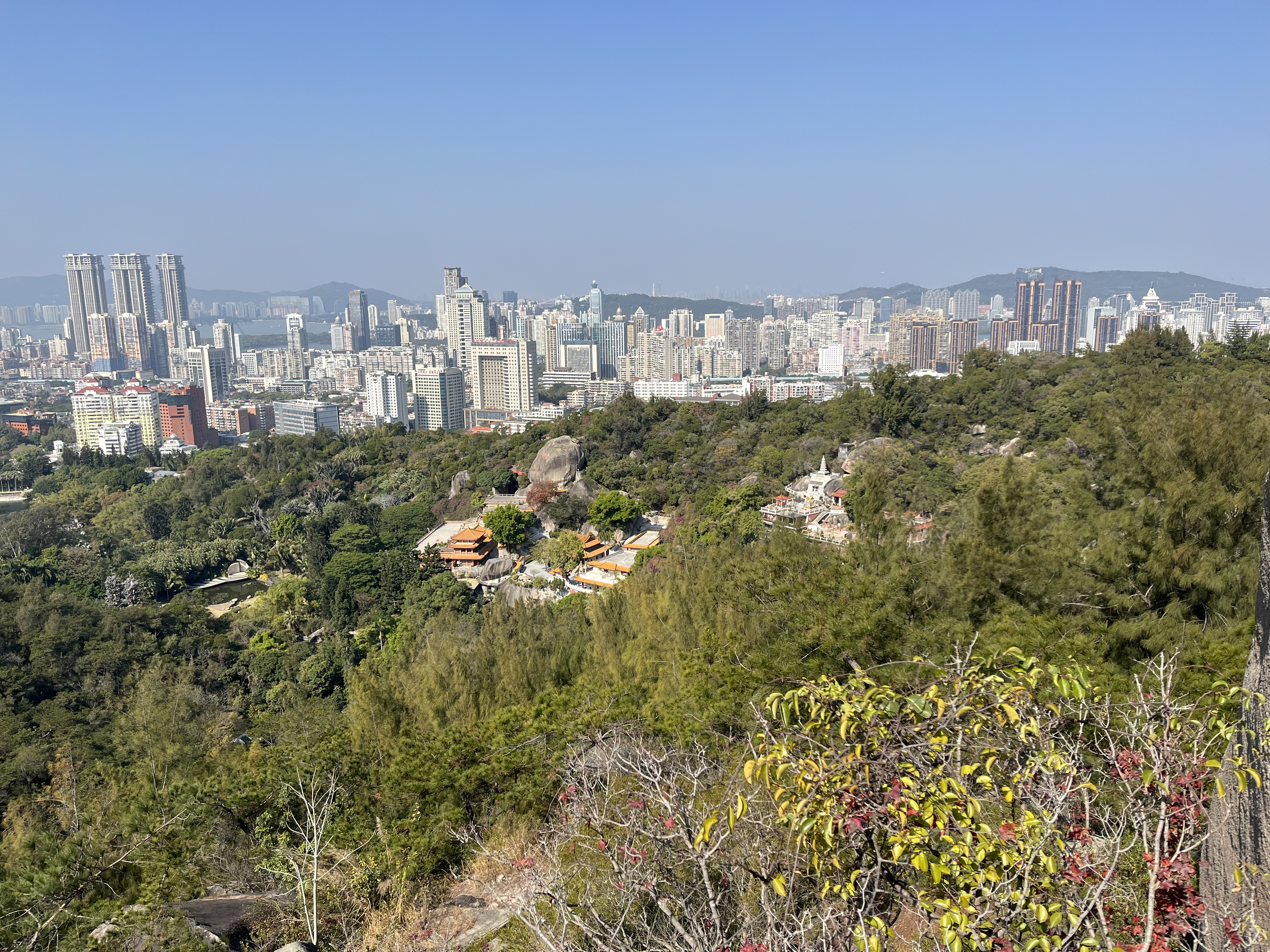
- Interactive map of Xiamen Botanical Garden
- Location: Xiamen, China
- Coordinates: 24°27.3′N 118°05.5′E
- Opened: 1960
- Visitors: over 1,000,000 per year
- Status: Open all year
- Public transit: Zhongshan Park (Line 1)
- Director: Ding Yinlong (丁印龙)
- Website: https://www.xiamenbg.com/

Xiamen Botanical Garden (XMBG; Chinese: 厦门市园林植物园; pinyin: Xiàmén Shì yuánlín zhíwùyuán) founded in 1960, is located in the Siming District of Xiamen Island, covering an area of 493 hectares. Over 9,000 species of plants are preserved in its living collections. The garden is a member of Botanic Gardens Conservation International.

It is classified as a AAAAA scenic area by the Ministry of Culture and Tourism.

== History ==
On February 10, 1984, Deng Xiaoping planted a camphor tree in the Araucaria lawn area of the garden.

== Features ==
The garden includes 16 special thematic areas: Araucaria Lawn, Succulent Garden, Cacti Garden, Cycads Garden, Gymnosperms Garden, Rainforest Area, Herbaceous/Flower Garden, Strange and Peculiar Plants Garden, Palm Garden, Bamboo Garden, Camellia Garden, Vines and Lianas Garden, Medical Plants Garden, Zingiberaceae Garden, Fujian and Taiwanese plants garden, Mintai Garden.

The Succulent Garden is the largest area display of succulent plants in China.

The grounds of the garden contain many temples including: Tianjie Temple, Wanshilian Temple, Banling Land Temple, Zhongyan Temple, and Taipingyan Temple.

== Transportation ==
The West Gate entrance of Xiamen Botanical Garden can be reached from the Xiamen Metro using Xiamen Metro Line 1 to Zhongshan Park.

== Research and Conservation ==
The garden is home to the National Bougainvillea Germplasm Resource Bank, which conserves more than 420 varieties of Bougainvillea.

Additionally the garden has a Palm Plant Conservation Center, a biotechnology laboratory, a succulent plant laboratory, and a herbarium.

== See also ==
- List of botanical gardens
