= Longtan Grand Canyon =

Canyon in Henan, China

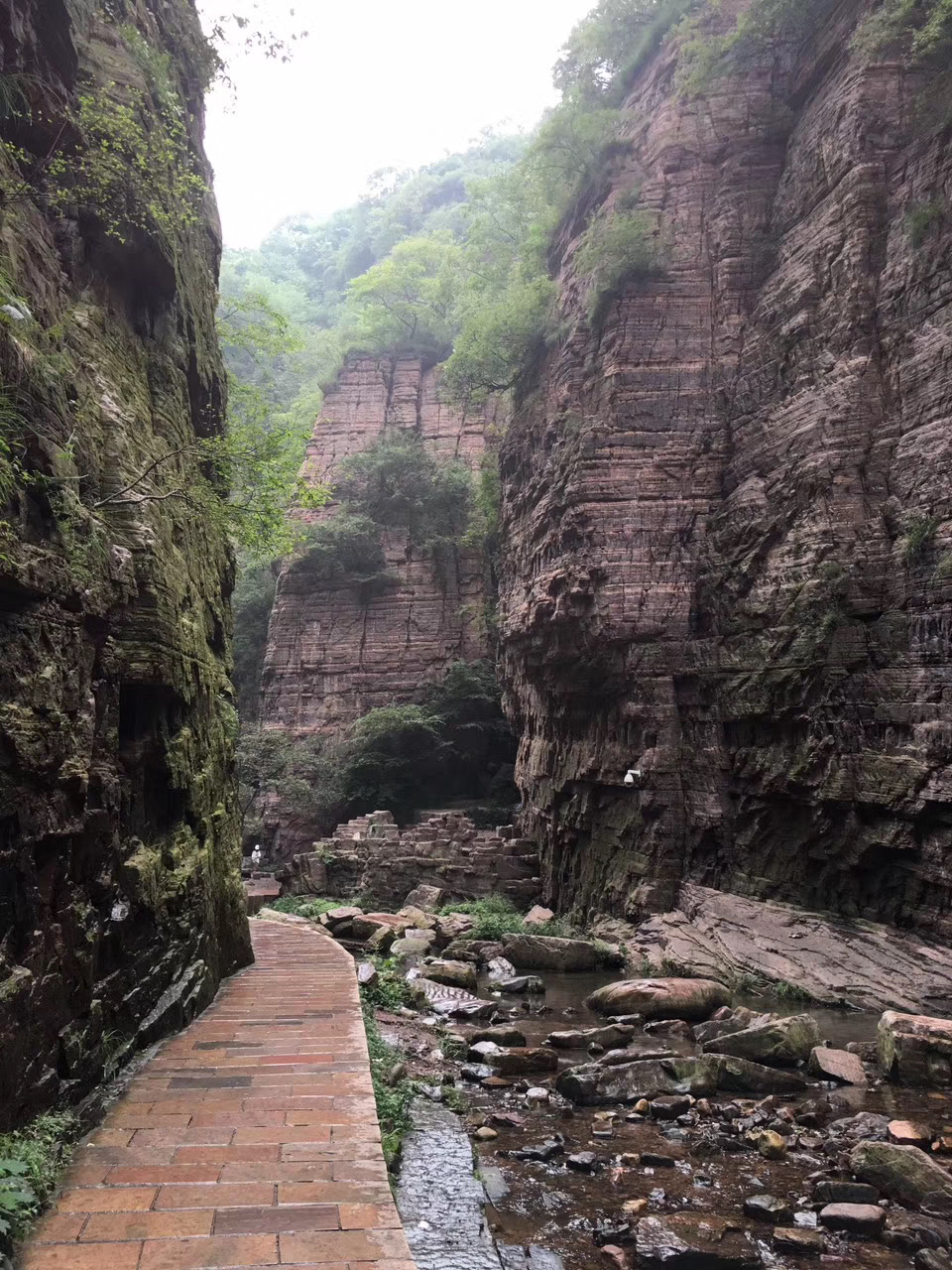

- Location within Henan Location within China
- Area: 20 km^{2} (7.7 mi^{2})

Geology
- Age: 2.6 million years

Geography
- Location: Luoyang, Henan, China
- Coordinates: 34.969°N 112.004°E
- Interactive map of Longtan Grand Canyon

Longtan Grand Canyon is a AAAAA class tourist attraction in Luoyang, Henan, China. It is located in Xin'an County which is 70 km away from Luoyang city.

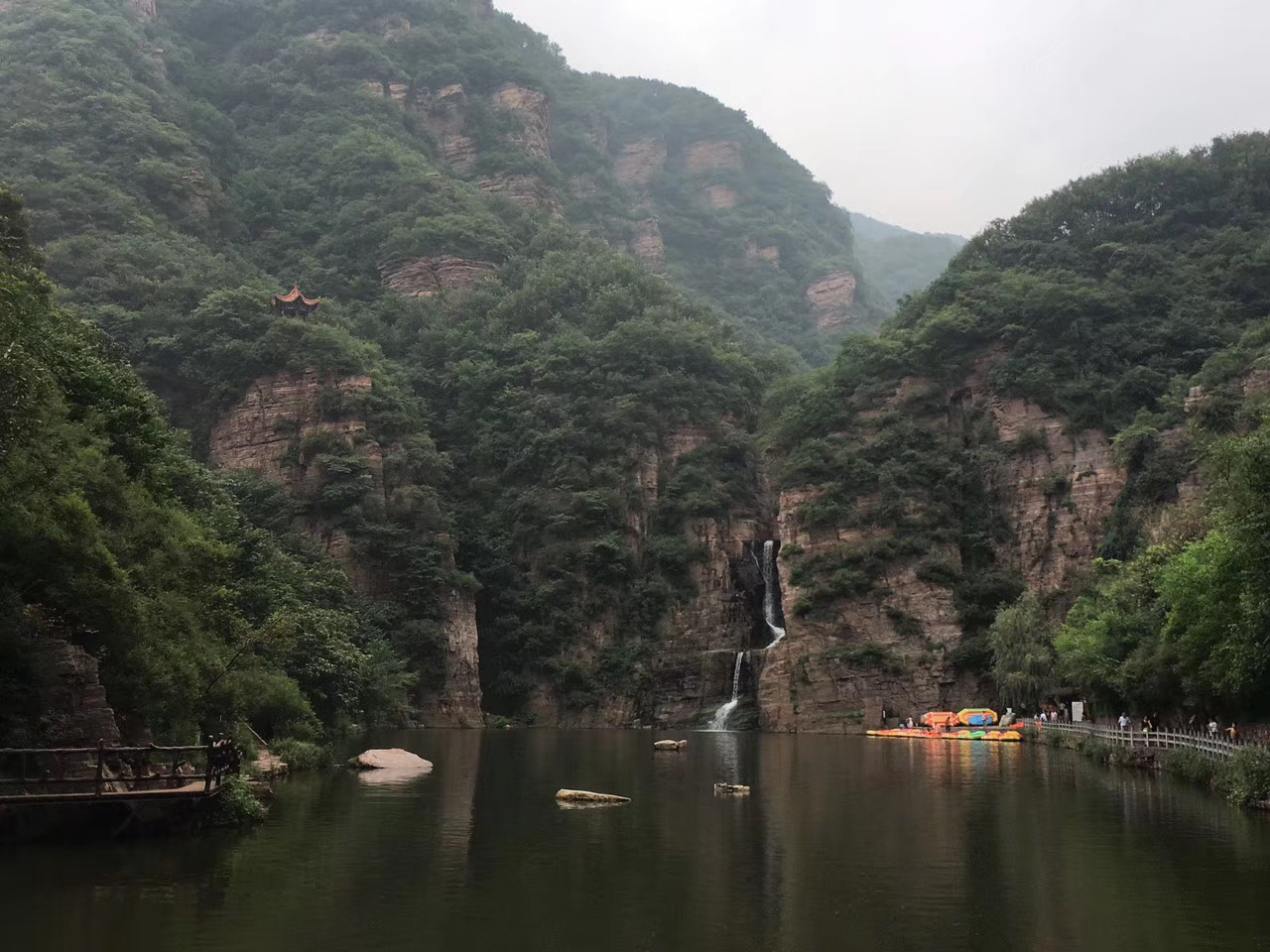

The U-shaped valley with a total length of 12 kilometers, covering an area of 20 square kilometers, is famous for its high mountains, quiet valleys, waterfalls, and special purplish-red quartz sandstone formed years corrosion of flowing water. It is also the core scenic spot of Wangwushan-Daimeishan UNESCO Global Geopark.

Longtan Grand Canyon has many good reputations including "First Gorge of Chinese Valleys" since its development in 2005. It is also the only spot selected in Henan Province in the "40 beautiful places to visit in China" by CNN.

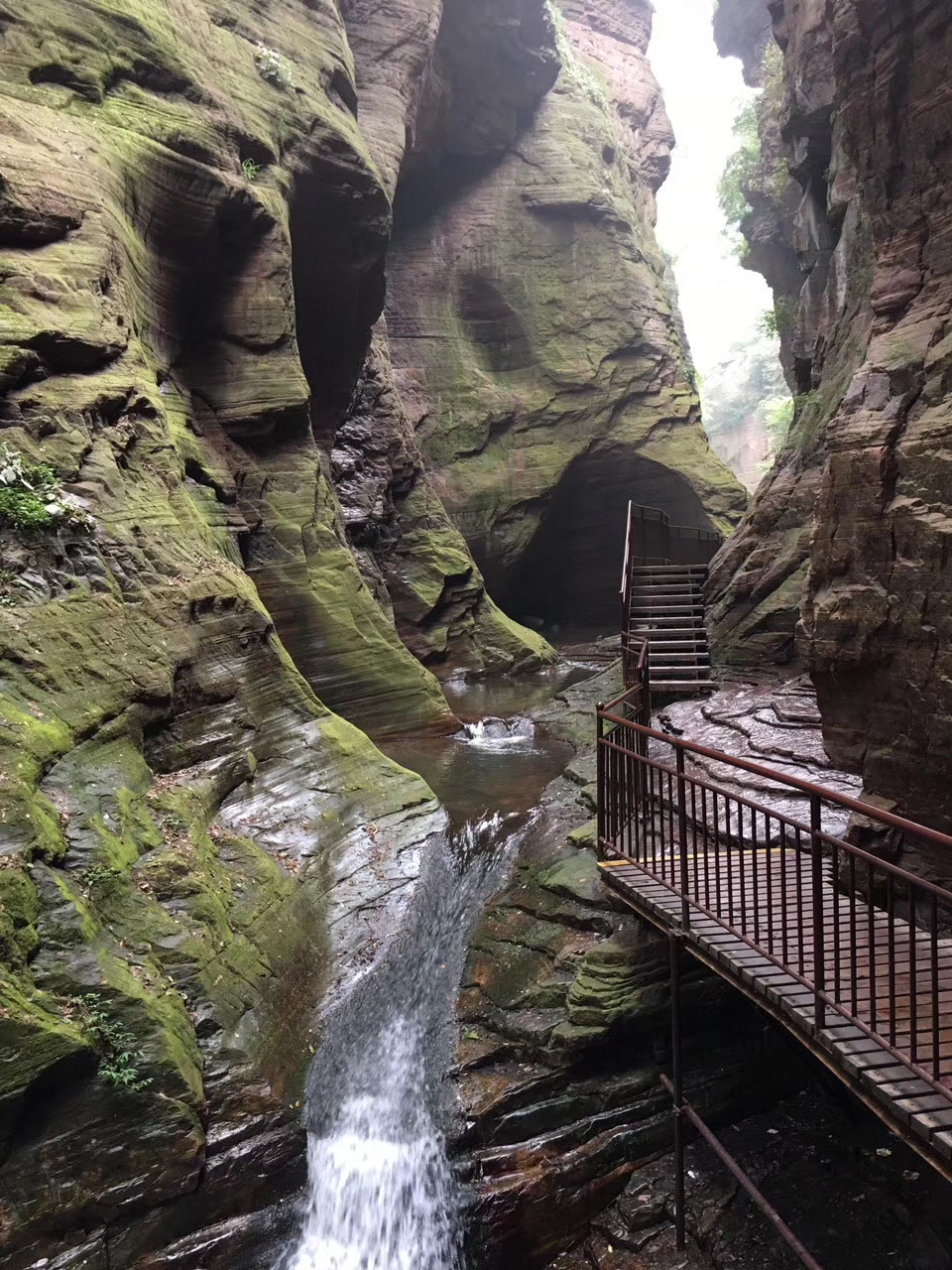

The peak season is from March to October.

== See also ==
- Luoyang
- Longmen Grottoes
- Water Banquet
