= Guwenhua Jie =

Pedestrian tourist area of Tianjin, China

Coordinates: 39.1422°N 117.1930°E

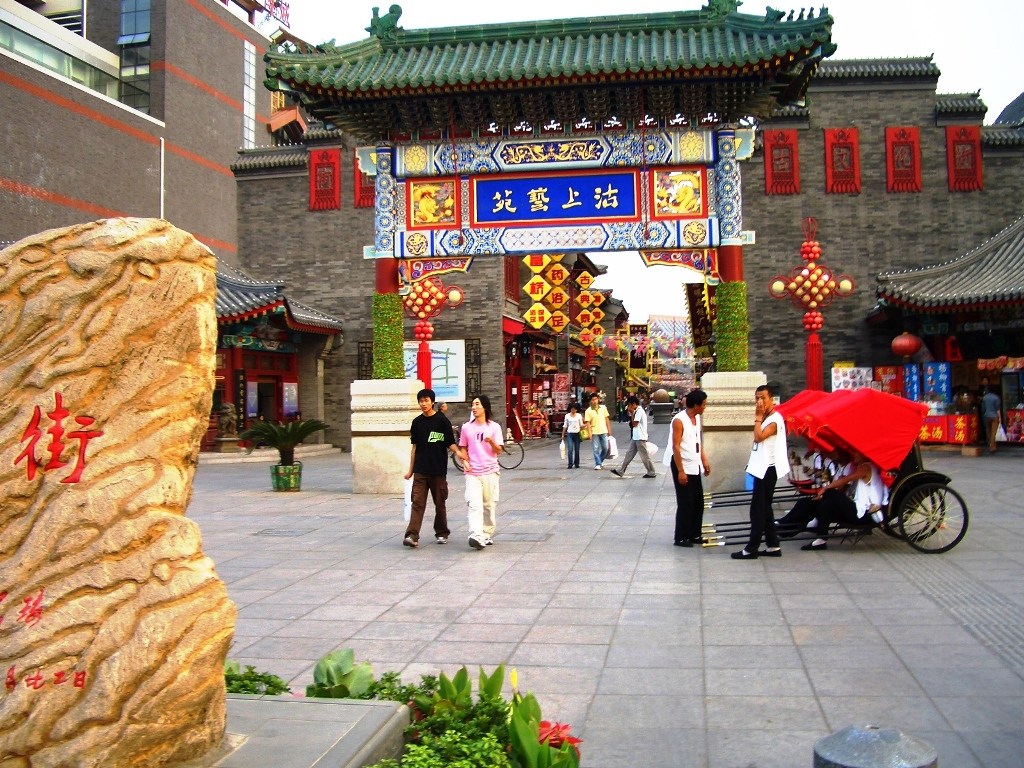
- Main Gate
- Simplified Chinese: 古文化街
Transcriptions
Standard Mandarin
- Hanyu Pinyin: Gǔwénhuà Jiē

Guwenhua Jie, Tianjin's Ancient Culture Street, is a pedestrian pathway complex dotted with temple gates and kiosks on the west bank of the Hai River in Tianjin, China. The Nankai District area is classified as a AAAAA scenic area by the China National Tourism Administration.

Tianjin Ancient Culture Street was opened on New Year's Day in 1986. It preserves the architectural style of Qing dynasty, with its Niangniang Palace honoring the sea-goddess Mazu in the center. There are many tourist attractions along the street.

== Queen of Heaven Palace ==
The Queen of Heaven, Tianhou, or Niangniang Palace is a temple to the Chinese sea-goddess Mazu, a medieval Fujianese who was later deified. It is in the middle of the Ancient Culture Street. Other names include "Niangniang" or "Tianhou Temple", the "Tianfei Palace", the "Xiaozhigu Tianfei Palace", and the "Western Temple".

The Niangniang Palace was first constructed in 1326 under the Yuan; it has subsequently been repaired many times.

The complex faces east with the Haihe River running in front. From east to west, the main buildings are the Opera Tower, the Flag Pole, the Temple Gate, the Memorial Archway, the Front Hall, the Main Hall, Canon-Storing Pavilion, the Qisheng Temple, the Bell-Drum Tower, the Side Hall, and the Zhangxian Pavilion. The Main Hall is constructed on a high and large platform, which is typical for wooden structures of the mid- to late-Ming Dynasty. The complex is one of the three major surviving Mazu temples in China and one of the oldest.

The main function of the temple is to pray for safe navigation. The palace was a center of marine sacrifice in past dynasties and a venue for sailors to have happy get-togethers. Besides ceremonial rituals held to worship the Goddess of the Sea, performances are held to thank her. It is said that the 23rd day of the third month of the Chinese lunar calendar is Matsu's birthday and a folk flower fair is held here annually to commemorate her on the day.

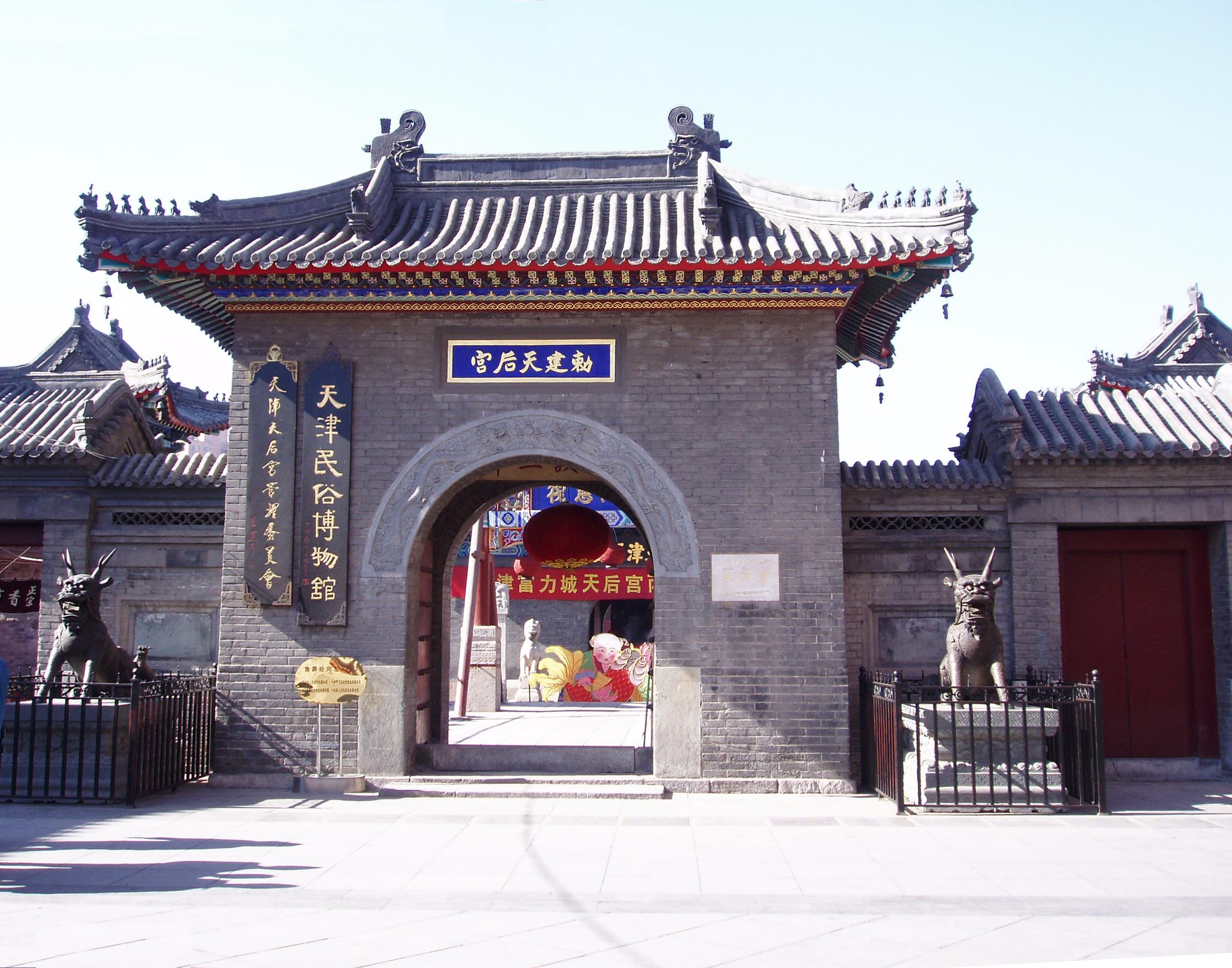
Main gate, announcing that the temple was "imperially established"

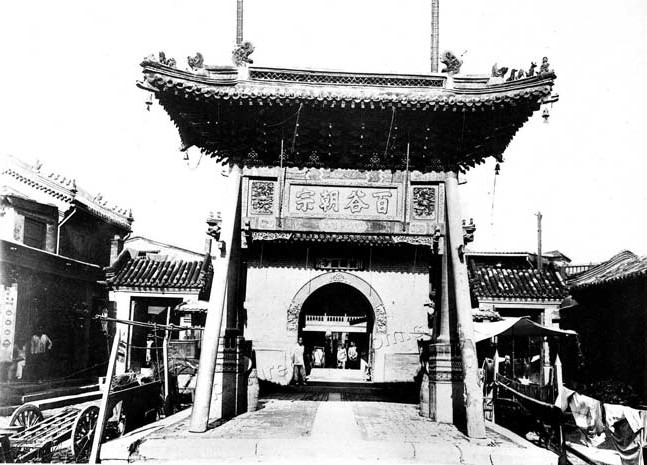
The entry paifang c. 1910

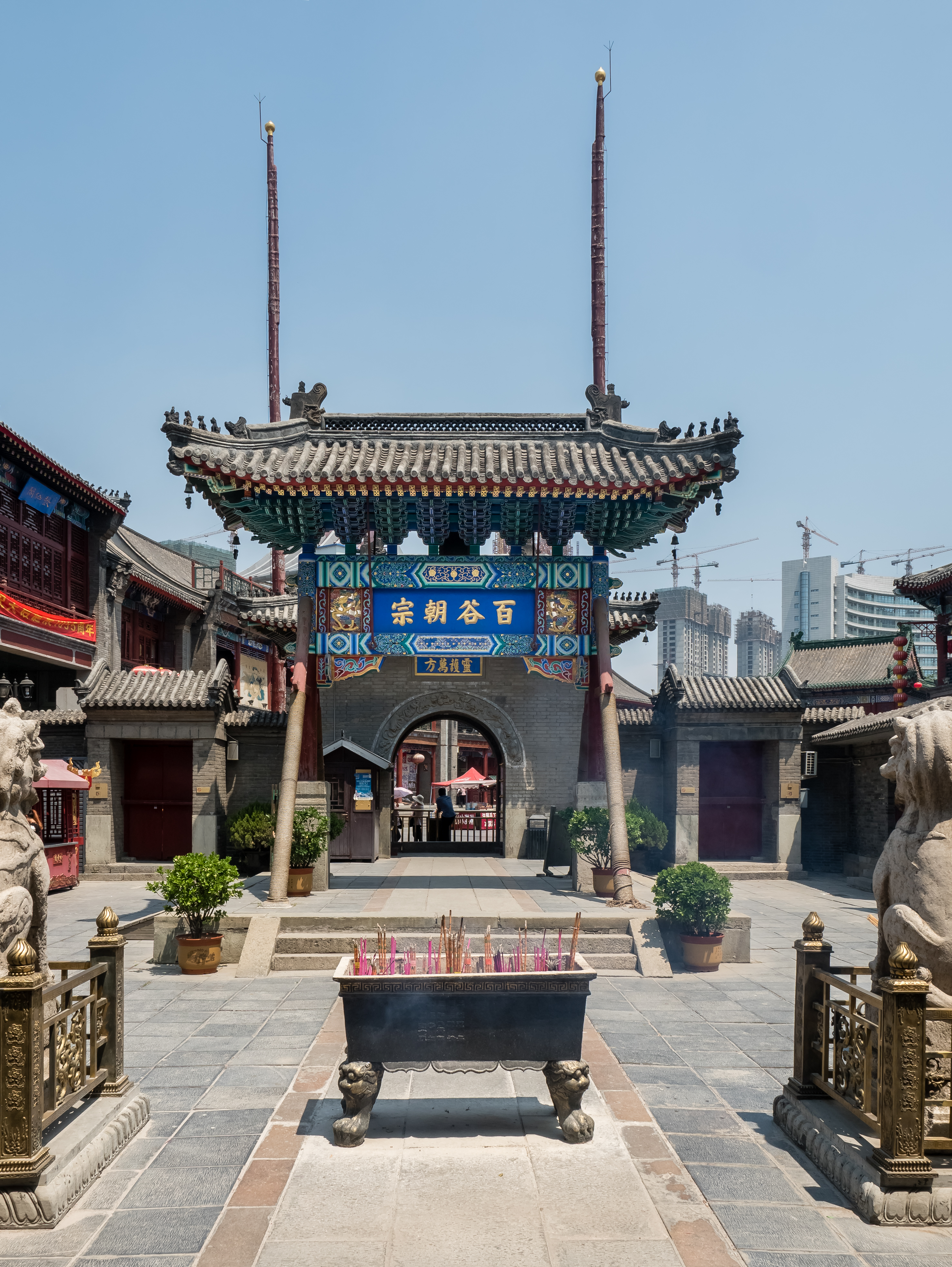
The entry paifang in 2015

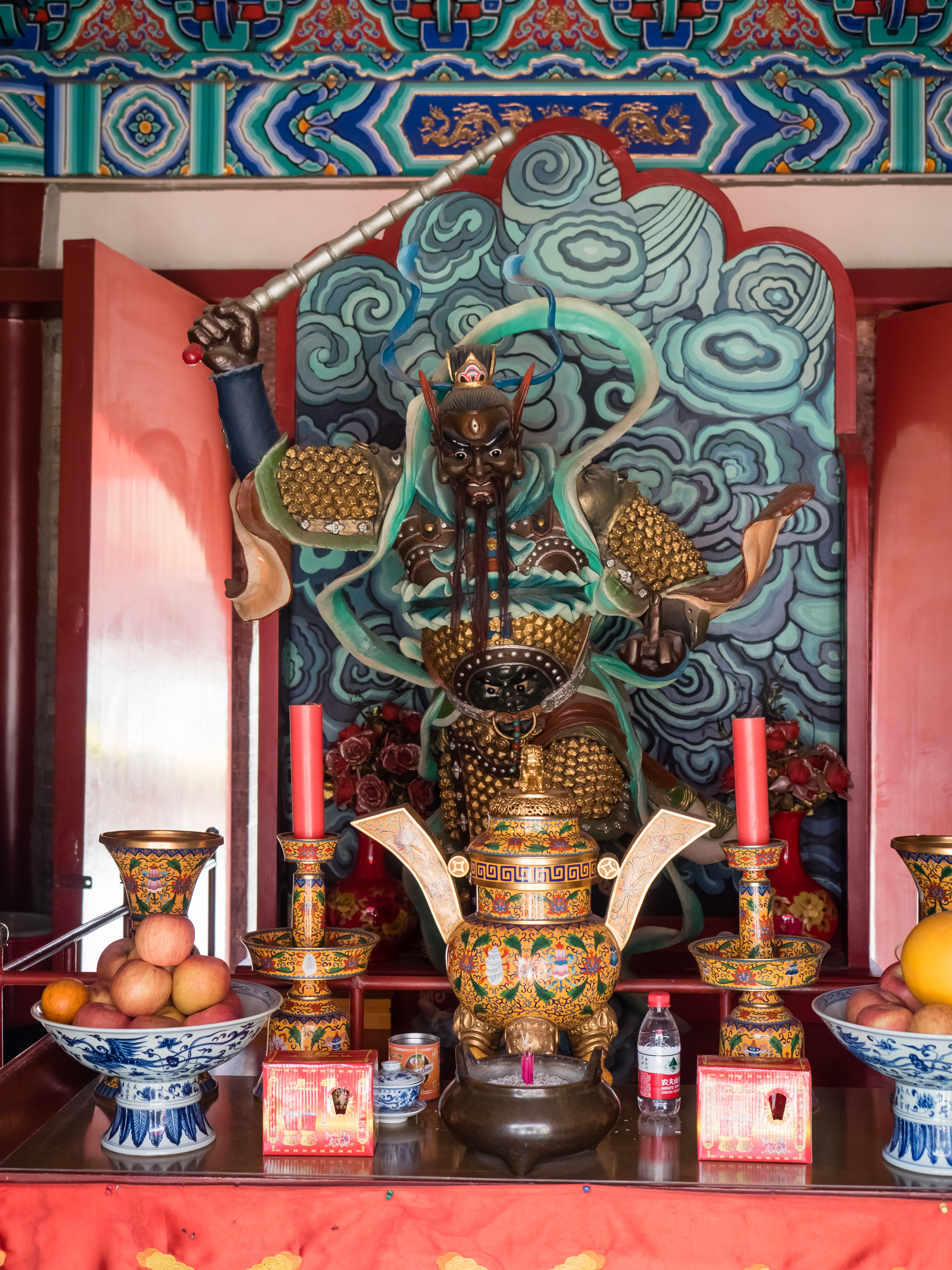
An altar with idol and offerings

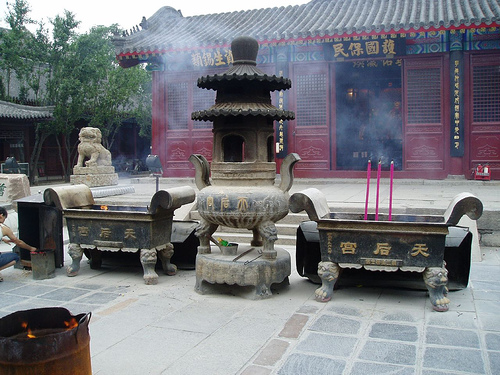
Incense burners

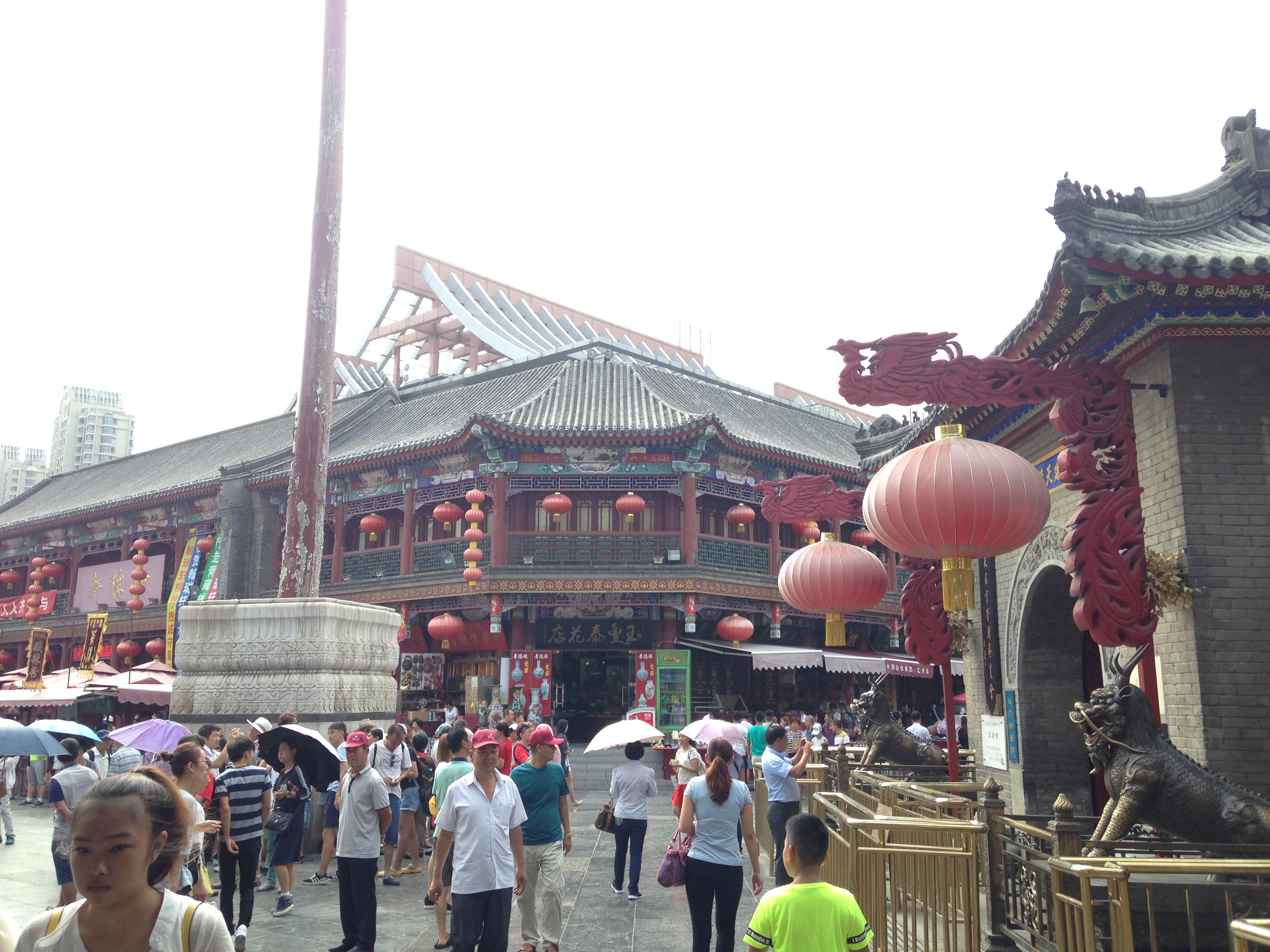
The street outside the temple

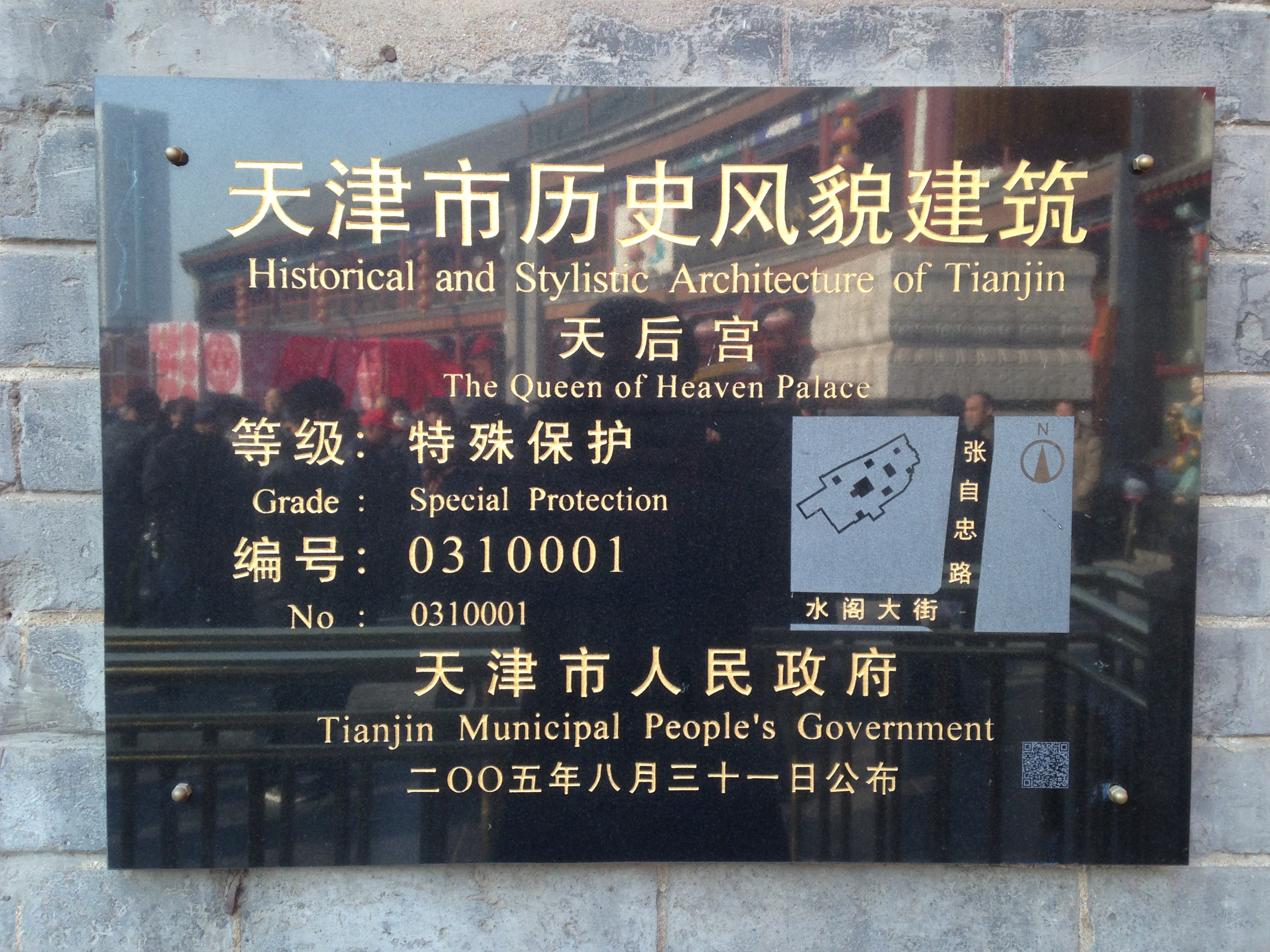
The site's official tourism plaque

== Yuhuangge Taoist Temple ==
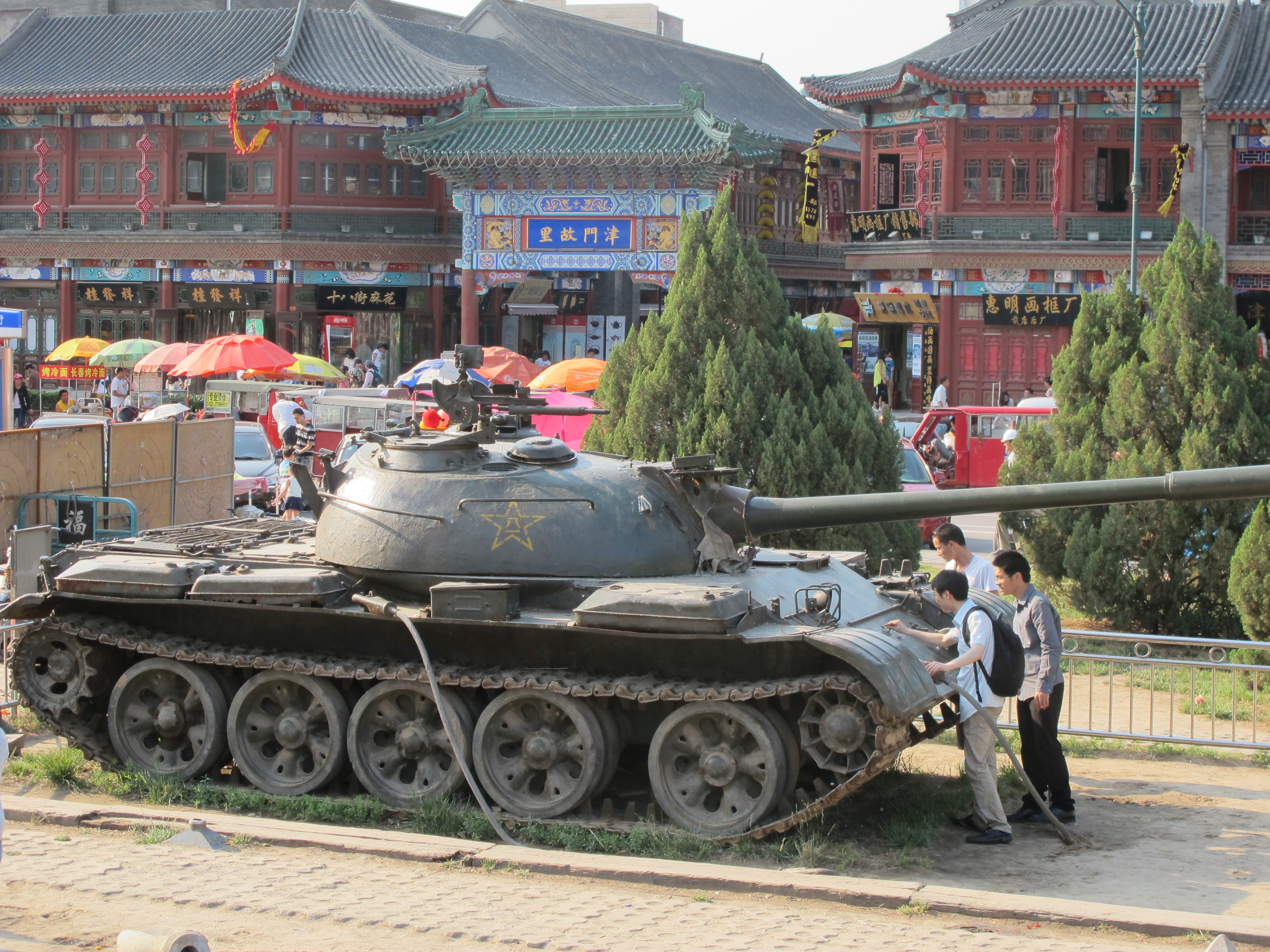
Type 69 Jinmen Guli Tank on display

Yuhuangge Taoist Temple was once the most famous building group in Hai River Triple Junction. In 2007, an ancient government road in Ming Dynasty was found, however large-scale excavation was not made due to architectural and other reasons.

A few days ago, many famous historians had special argumentation in respect of discovering historical and cultural resources of the Cultural Street, and improving the cultural landscape of Yuhuangge Taoist Temple. Around Yuhuangge Taoist Temple, there may be many historical relics and sites to be discovered. Experts advised the restoration of the museum held by historical Zhili Public Welfare Services in this Temple about one hundred years ago, forming the "Yuhuangge Historical Museum".

Yuhuangge was built in Hongwu Years of Ming Dynasty, 1368 AD, and is one of the oldest buildings remaining in Tianjin.
