= Mount Laojun (Henan) =

Mountain in Henan Province, China

Laojun Mountain 老君山
- Lǎo jūnshān
- The Golden Summit of Laojun

Highest point
- Elevation: 2,184 m (7,165 ft)
- Coordinates: 33.7205°N 111.6437°E

Geography
- Location within China
- Location: Luanchuan County, Henan, China

Mount Laojun (also called Jingshi Mountain 景室山) is a mountain in Henan Province, China.

Along with the Jiguan Cave, the mountain is part of the Funiu Mountain National Geopark, a tourist scenic area that is rated as AAAAA, the highest category in the tourist rating system.

The mountain has a long history as a sacred location in Taoism, and in the legend is where Laozi retired and cultivated his spiritual practice. Successive dynasties from the Northern Wei onwards built, maintained, and rebuilt temples here in honour of Laozi. While today it is a popular destination for domestic tourists, Luanchuan County is one of the few public locations in modern China that is closed to overseas visitors. Possible reasons for this include the presence of military bases in or nearby the county or that it is a natural gene bank of medicinal herbs, but no official explanation has been given.

A view over the mountains from the summit

== See also ==
- List of mountains in China
