= Mount Dajue =

Mountainous area in Jiangxi, China

Coordinates: 27°41′56″N 117°08′10″E

Mount Dajue, also known as Dajue Mountain or Dajueshan, is a mountainous area and tourist attraction in Zixi County, Fuzhou, Jiangxi, China. It is one of the AAAAA Tourist Attractions of China.

Dajue Mountain tourist area's highest elevation is 1,647m, and covers an area of 204 kilometers squared. The area contains ancient forest and cultural attractions, as well as canyon activities. Dajue Peak is located in the area and has a cableway reaching 1,200m altitude, and reaches a maximum height of 1,360 meters. There is also Dajue Temple, which is a large granite cave with a total depth of 69m; the temple has a history dating back at least 1,600 years, and is located in Lotus Mountain. A leisure resort has been built within the park. As of 2017, a glass bridge was another attraction in the area.

The mountain has a subtropical humid monsoon climate, with an average of 1,596.7 hours of sunshine per year, an average temperature of 16.9 degrees Celsius and a rainfall of 1,929.9 mm annually. The scenic area is home to 123 rare and endangered species. These include Taxus chinensis and the gingko. There are at least 206 species of animals under state protection, including the clouded leopard and Asian black bear.

The scenic area became designated a AAAAA Tourist attraction in February 2017, becoming the first privately run scenic spot to be included as a AAAAA attraction.

In 2012, the TV series Tianxianpei Houzhuan ( Story after Goddess Marriage) was filmed in this location.

== History ==
The temple, located in a stone cave, has an extensive history. According to tradition, temples were built within the cave as early as the Eastern Jin, possibly as early as the first year of the reign of Emperor Cheng of Jin. At that time, the mountain was known as Lianhua (Lotus) Mountain, and the temple became known as the Lion Rock Temple. Legend would then indicate that during the reign of Emperor Taizong of Tang, the abbot of Lingyin Temple in Hangzhou, Master Dajue, meditated in this location, and the temple received its name after the Abbot. The temple has been built and destroyed many times, most recently being rebuilt in 1985.
