= Yunlong Lake =

Lake in Jiangsu, China

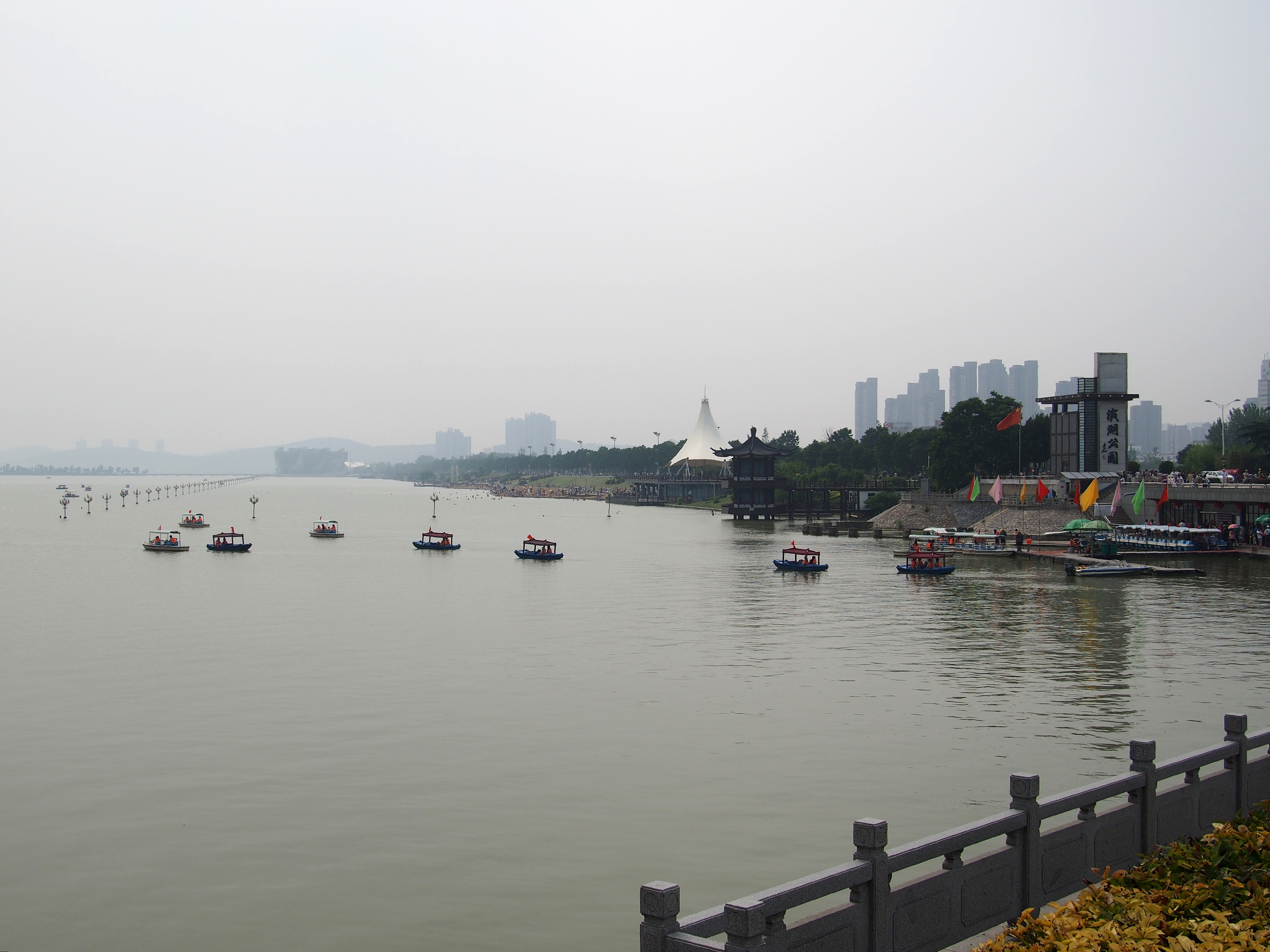

- Location within Jiangsu
- Location: Xuzhou, Jiangsu
- Coordinates: 34.2345874°N 117.1186608°E
- Basin countries: China
- Surface area: 7.5 km^{2} (2.9 sq mi)

Yunlong Lake (Chinese: 云龙湖) is a lake in Xuzhou, Jiangsu, China. Yunlong Mountain lies to its east.

== Tourism ==
Since 2016, it is classified as a AAAAA scenic area by the China National Tourism Administration. The scenic area contains ancient-style bridges and buildings.

== Ecology ==
The lake and its surroundings contain peach, willow, plum, and red maple trees. The lake also contains lotus plants.
