= Yanshanian =

Tectonic movement in China during the Jurassic and Cretaceous

The Yanshanian movement were first recognized by Weng WH (1927,1929) in the Yanshan area of China (116°-119.5°N, 40°-42°E). Since then, the Yanshanian has been used as a local term in China for tectonic events which occurred mainly during the Jurassic Period. Later, Ding WJ (1929), Huang JQ (1945,1960) and Zhao ZF (1959) extended the term to cover tectonic events which occurred throughout China during the Jurassic and Cretaceous tectonic periods. However, it was soon realized that tectonic and magmatic events in the Jurassic and Cretaceous were very different. In the Jurassic there are NNE-NE trending folds and thrusts related to transpressional tectonics, and WNW trending normal faults with some strike-slip movement and widespread calc-alkaline magmatism, while the Cretaceous is characterized predominantly by extensional tectonics with NE-NNE trending normal faults, WNW trending folds and thrusts and highly alkaline acid magmatism located along faults, or at fault intersection.

== Influences on China ==
- Counterclockwise rotation of Chinese continent, westwards subduction and compression of Okhotsk and Izanagi Plate.
- Formation of Neocathaysian Tectonic System and the Wandashan Collision Zone.
- Violent detachments and tectono-magmatism in the crust of Eastern China.
