= Yesanpo National Park =

National park in China

- 野三坡
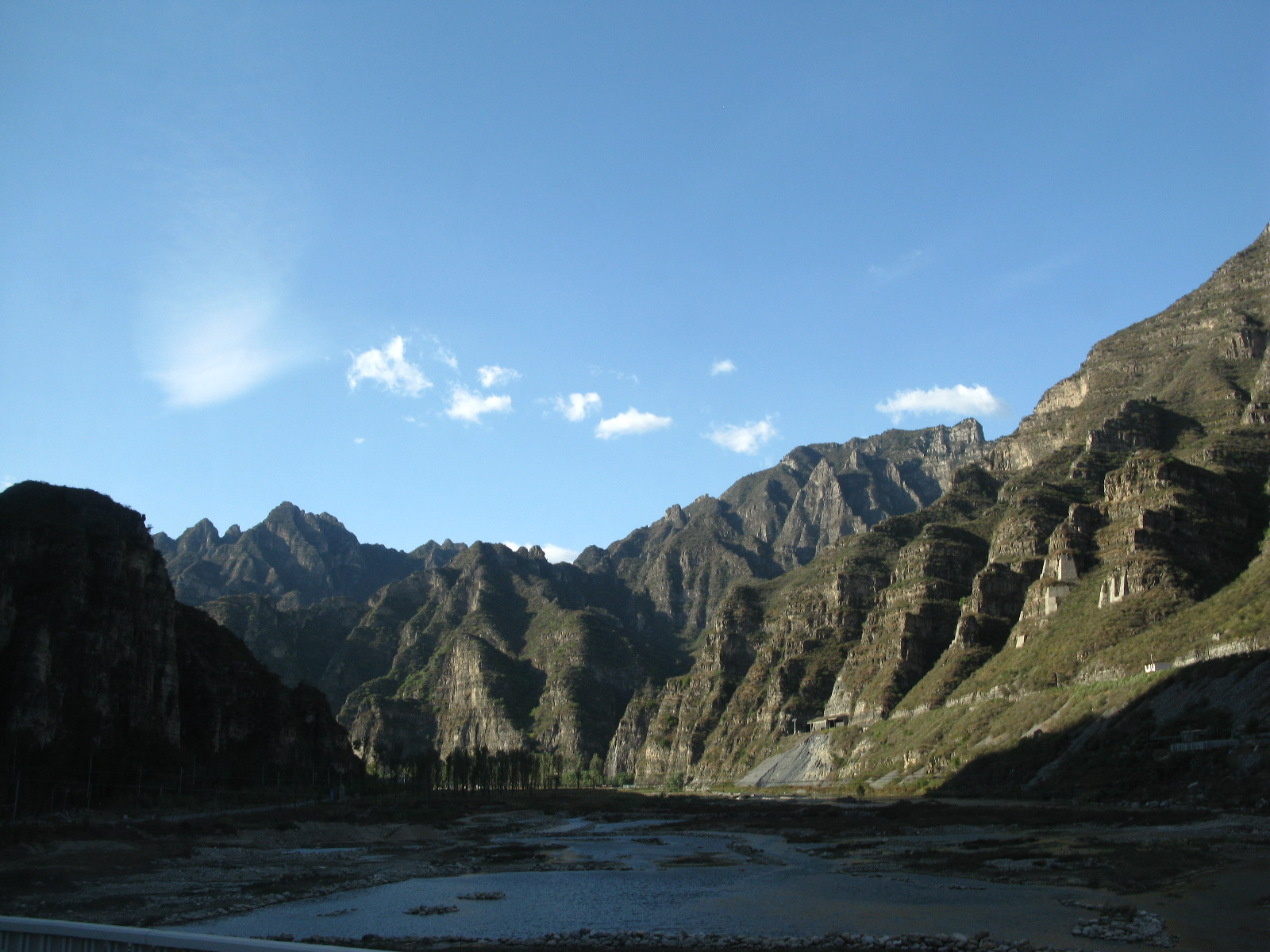
- Yesanpo, Hebei, China

- Location within China
- Location: Hebei
- Nearest city: Baoding
- Coordinates: 39°6′0″N 115°2′0″E
- Area: 520 square kilometres (52,000 ha; 128,495 acres; 201 sq mi)

Yesanpo National Park (Chinese: 野三坡; pinyin: Yěsānpō; lit. 'Wild Three Slope') (also, Yesanpo Scenic Site, or Yesanpo Geopark, and component areas) is a national park in Laishui County, Hebei Province, China about 2 hours west of Beijing. Yesanpo consists of six main scenic sites, including the Bai Li Xia Gorge ("hundred li gorge", which is about 31 miles), portions of the Juma River, Baicaopan Forest, and Jinhua Mountain. The park is located where the Taihang Mountains meet the Yan Mountains.

Although designated as a national park, Yesanpo is not listed as an IUCN Level II "protected area" in the World Database of Protected Areas (WDPA). However, "Yesanpo Scenic Area" is listed by the governmental China National Tourism Administration, and components are listed in the WDPA. For example, Binlixia Nature Reserve is listed as an IUCN Level V Protected Area.

== Climate and ecoregion ==
Yesanpo has a humid continental climate (Koppen climate classification Dwa), characterized by four distinct seasons, a windy spring, rainy summer, cool autumn, and dry winter with little snow. The best months for visiting the region are April through October when the weather and scenery is best. The ecoregion is Central China Loess Plateau Mixed Forest.

== Tourism ==
The scenic areas are well-developed for tourism. Transportation to the park is available on the "Yesanpo Tourist Special Line" from Beijing West Railway Station, with a destination of Yesanpo Station or Bailixia Station.

== See also ==
- Geography of China
