= Baligou =

Valley in Henan, China

Baligou Valley (simplified Chinese: 八里沟; traditional Chinese: 八里溝; pinyin: Bālǐgōu; lit. 'Eight Mile Valley'), also known as North Water World, is located in Xinxiang City in the Taihang Mountain scenic area in Henan Province, People's Republic of China. In 2006 Baligou Valley was named a National AAAA-class tourist attraction. And a AAAAA in 2020. The site offers eco-tourism, leisure, vacation, entertainment, tourism, and aquaculture in the original natural scenery.

== Geography ==
Baligou Valley is located in the Taihang Mountains spanning the two provinces of Henan and Shanxi, lying some 50 kilometres (31 mi) from Xinxiang City and 20 kilometres (12 mi) from Huixian City. It has a total scenic area of 40 km^{2} (15 sq mi).

== Scenery ==
Baligou Valley includes Peach Bay, Mountain Temple, Sheep State, Hongshi River and One-Line Sky, known together as the Five Baligou Valley Scenic Spots. It has 5 metres (16 ft) wide waterfalls with a drop of 157 metres (515 ft) which flow throughout the year. Baligou Valley has ancient and original natural scenery with a forest coverage rate of up to 90%, more than 1,700 plant species. The annual average temperature is 14 degrees whilst the anion content of the atmosphere 5000 per cubic centimeter making it a natural oxygen bar.
