= Meizhou Tianhou Palace =

Mazu temple on Meizhou Island, China

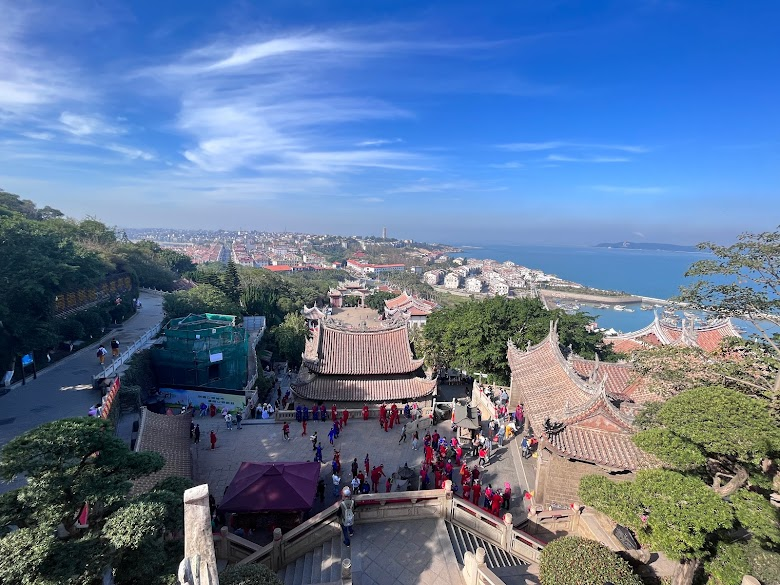
湄洲妈祖庙Meizhou Tianhou Palace

Meizhou Tianhou Palace (Putian dialect:/ma˩˩ l ˦ tan˧ piau˩˩/), commonly known as Meizhou Mazu Temple, formerly known as Tongxian Ling Female Temple, is located on Meizhou Island, Xiuyu District, Putian City, Fujian Province, China, where the Goddess of Heaven (Mazu) is worshipped. Founded in the Northern Song Dynasty in 987, in 1966 the Cultural Revolution, except for the shrine of the Goddess and the Holy Parents of almost all dstroyed, the temple was bulldozed, the gods were destroyed, and incense was cut off. It was rebuilt in 1989.

== History ==
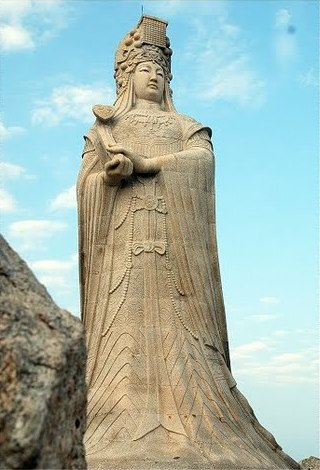
「Meizhou Holy Land - Tin Hau Square (Meizhou Island)

Emperor Taizu of Song, in the first year of Jianlong (960), on the 23rd day of the third lunar month, Lin Mo was born on Meizhou Island in Putian, Fujian Province. Mazu, as she is now known, was a descendant of the prominent Lin family in Fujian Province.

According to legend, Meizhou Island is Mazu's hometown and the place where she ascended to heaven in Taoism. The Meizhou Mazu Temple, located on Xinghua Putian's Meizhou Island, was originally built in the fourth year of the Yongxi reign during the Northern Song Dynasty (987). The original small temple, known as the "Temple of the Goddess of Spirit," was located behind the Temple of Zhao. This is recognized as the earliest Mazu temple in the world. The temple underwent its first major expansion during the Tiansheng period (1023–1032), and by then, the ancestral temple had begun to take shape.

During the Yuan Dynasty , the Mazu Temple was further expanded. In his poem "The Imperial Palace of the Emperor Shengdun," Hong Xiwen described the scene as "the white walls live in the shade of the light, and the Hua-surface antler-horn suddenly passes the flying mountains," reflecting the architectural situation of the Mazu Temple.

In the Ming Dynasty , the temple was further expanded. In the seventh year of Hongwu (1374), Zhou Sat, under Quanzhou Wei's command, presided over the reconstruction of the sleeping hall, incense pavilion, drum tower, and mountain gate. In the early years of Yongle (1403), When Zheng He went to the West seven times, the official was ordered to repair the temple because Mazu blessed the meritorious service. In the sixth year of Xuande (1431), before Zheng He's last voyage to the West, he prepared wood and stones with local officials to restore the ancestral temple.

In the 20th year of the Kangxi reign (1681), the temple was rebuilt after being abandoned. In 1683, Yao Qisheng, governor of Fujian Province, rebuilt the bell tower, drum tower, and mountain gate, transforming the Tiantian Pavilion into the "New Main Hall." However, local people disagreed with this approach and continued to refer to the "Old Main Hall" (later known as "Shenzhao Hall") as the "Main Hall." Over time, the "Prince Taibao Yao Gong Dian" (commonly shortened to "Prince Hall") became another prominent name for the site.

In the 23rd year of Kangxi's reign (1684), Shi Lang, Marquis of Jinghai, added the Chaotian Pavilion, dressing rooms, a Buddhist hall, and monk quarters. He also built the Middle Hall, Guanyin Pavilion, and a land temple near the stone ancestral temple. By then, the complex featured five groups of buildings, 16 halls, and 99 rooms, making it grand in scale.

The ancestral temple on Meizhou Island was destroyed during the Cultural Revolution. Fortunately, many Mazu temples in Taiwan preserved the golden statue of Meizhou Mazu, including Lugang Tianhou Palace, Hsinchu Changhe Palace, Beigang Chaotian Palace, Nanzi Tianhou Palace, Yan Shui Protection Palace, and Qijin Tianhou Palace. Since the 1980s, believers from China and abroad, especially from Taiwan, have donated funds to rebuild the ancestral temple on Meizhou Island. The existing buildings are largely reconstructed after the Cultural Revolution.

As of 2023, Taiwanese citizens can travel to Meizhou Island via a ferry from Wenjia Pier at a discounted fare of only 20 yuan, a privilege not extended to tourists from other regions.

== Architecture ==
=== Meizhou Ancestral Temple Overview ===
The Meizhou Ancestral Temple is a five-entry imitation Song Dynasty architectural complex, measuring 323 meters in length and 99 meters in width. The temple features a large archway, palace gate, bell and drum towers, Shunji Hall, Tianhou Square, the main hall, Lingci Hall, and Mazu Cultural Park. Behind the temple, stone carvings such as the Shengtian Monument and Guanlan are inscribed on the rocks. At the summit of the ancestral temple, there is a 14-meter-tall stone statue of Mazu.

=== 太子殿 Prince's Hall ===
Originally named Chaotian Pavilion, this hall was renamed during the Kangxi reign of the Qing Dynasty. Yao Qisheng, the Prince's Taibao, determined through feng shui calculations that the pavilion's placement was unsuitable and converted it into the main hall. However, believers disagreed and continued to regard the dormitory hall as the true "main hall." As a result, this structure became known as Prince Taibao Yao Gong Hall and was later referred to as Prince's Hall.

=== 正殿Zhengdian ===
Originally called "Main Hall", Yao Qisheng changed this hall to "Sleeping Hall" in previous years. But Shanxin did not pay attention to it, they all called this hall "Zhengdian". Yongzheng made a total of three "God Zhao sea watch" plaques, the other two were given to the Tai Tian Hou Palace in Tainan, Taiwan (after the fire burned down, today's plaque is a replica. There are many copies of well-known Mazu temples in Taiwan. Xiamen Tianhou Palace; There are Ming Dynasty Putian scholar Dai Dabin wrote "Qi Qi Qi Qi Qi Qi ring, Chao Chao Chao Chao Chao Chao Chao Chao" couplet, quite interesting,which the second, fourth, seventh, the cross of "Qi" and "Chao" words, respectively read "Zhai" and "tide", that is, "fasting", "tide sound" meaning.

=== 灵女祠 Temple of Lingnv ===
Adjacent to the Ascension Monument, this small temple is considered the birthplace of the ancestral temple and the earliest Mazu temple in existence. Known as the Tongxian Ling Female Temple, it was built by Meizhou islanders to honor Mazu after her ascension. During the Cultural Revolution, it narrowly avoided destruction, thanks to the protection of the local people.

=== 朝天阁 Chaotian Court ===
Crown Prince Taibao Yao Qisheng changed the "Court Day Pavilion" to "Prince Hall", "Court Day Pavilion" no longer exists. Jing Hai Hou Shi Lang and the new Chaotian pavilion. This pavilion is still preserved in Taiwan Lugang Tianhou Palace Qianlong Ding Wei year (1787) Meizhou incense relics.

=== 升天古迹 Ascension monument ===
According to legend, this is the place where Mazu ascended to heaven. The abbot monk of the Ming Dynasty "Zhao Cheng" carved the four characters "Ascension monument" on the cliff to commemorate Mazu.

=== 升天楼 Ascending tower ===
To commemorate Mazu's attainment of the Tao, the goddess was worshipped to ascend. But the ascension site is an "ascension monument."

=== 观音殿 Guanyin Hall ===
According to legend, Mazu is the incarnation of Guanyin, and the temple of the Great Mother will sacrifice Guanyin to read its virtue.

=== 佛祖殿 Buddha Hall ===
According to legend, Mazu believed in Buddhism and chanted sutras every day when he was alive, so Shi Lang, Marquis of Jinghai, donated the Buddha Hall and worshipped the three Buddha statues of Shakya, namely Shakya Tathagata, Manjusri Bodhisattva , and Puyin Bodhisattva. It was destroyed during the Cultural Revolution and rebuilt in 1989.

=== 五福殿 Hall of Five Blessings Hall ===
The Temple of Five Blessings Hall, also known as the Temple of Five Emperors, enshrines the Lord of Five Blessings. Wufu Emperor, also known as Wufu King, Wufu King, is the god of plague, so this temple does not set the main gate, to hope that the five emperors do not go out.

=== 圣父母祠 Shrine of the Holy Parents ===
This shrine houses statues of Mazu's parents, symbolizing her filial piety and deep respect for her roots even after her ascension. It was constructed during the Qing Dynasty.

=== 中军殿 Middle military Hall ===
The army hall is dedicated to the "army master", that is, the commander of Mazu's army generals, it is said that the Ming Dynasty Quanzhou Wei commanded "Zhou Sit" built, and the people think that the temple in the army master is "Zhou sit".

=== 梳妆楼 Shuzhuang tower ===
Built by Shi Lang, this building was intended as Mazu's living and dressing quarters. Like many other structures, it was destroyed during the Cultural Revolution and later rebuilt in 1989.

=== 灵慈殿 Hall of Spiritual Kindness ===
Constructed during the Yuan Dynasty, this hall commemorates Mazu's virtue of rescuing sailors in distress. Folklore suggests that Mazu often wore informal attire during rescues to ensure she arrived in time. To honor this tradition, the hall depicts Mazu in civilian clothing.

=== 顺济殿 Shun Ji Hall ===
This hall is dedicated to the Dragon Kings of the Four Seas and houses a golden statue of Mazu.

== Ancestral Temple of Tin Hau in Xianliang Port ==
The Xianlianggang Hau Ancestral Temple is located at the southern end of the Puxi Peninsula on the north bank of Meizhou Bay. It lies some distance from Meizhou Island, and visitors heading to Meizhou Island will pass by it on the way. This temple, regarded as the birthplace of Mazu, retains the "Royal Feng Hau Zhi" plaque bestowed by Emperor Qianlong, signifying its officially recognized orthodox status.

Inside the temple, the golden statue of Mazu, carved during the Song Dynasty in a soft-bodied style, is enshrined along with statues of her holy parents (Mazu's parents). According to tradition, when Mazu returned to her hometown for incense-offering ceremonies, she would first seek imperial approval and hold an audience at the Xianlianggang Hau Ancestral Temple. Only after completing the formalities there would she cross the sea from the Xianlianggang pier to the Meizhou Ancestral Temple to "mow the fire" (burn incense and honor ancestors). This ritual exemplifies Mazu's traditional virtue of filial piety.
