= Boundary Island (Western Australia) =

Island in Peel Inlet, Western Australia

Coordinates: 32°34′15″S 115°42′38″E

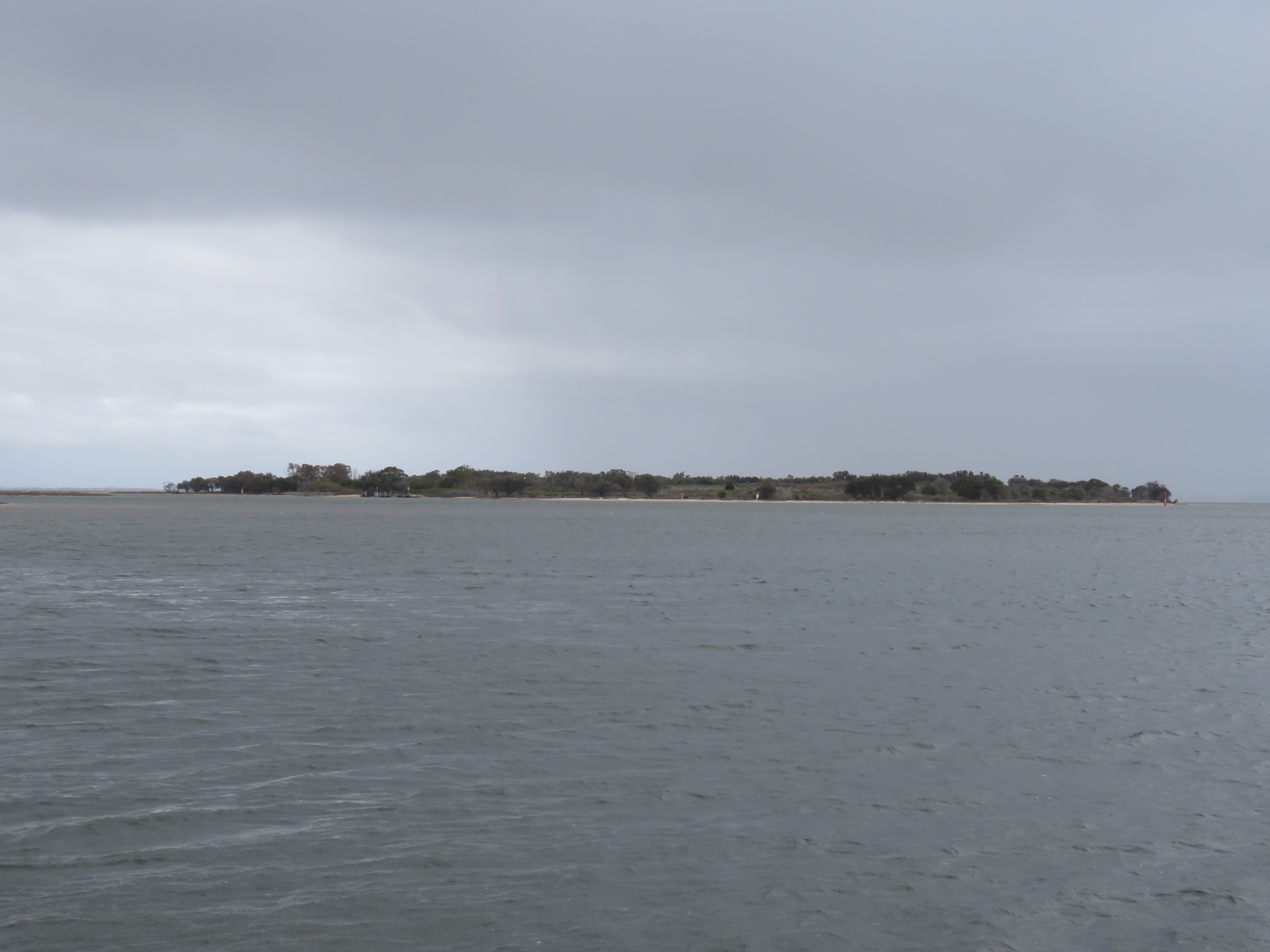
Boundary Island seen from the north in October 2021

Boundary Island is located in the Peel Inlet section of the Peel-Harvey Estuarine System, just south of Mandurah, Western Australia, about 80 km (50 mi) south of Perth.
