= Baiyun Mountain (Henan) =

Mountain in Henan, China

Baiyun Mountain is a scenic mountain in Song County, Luoyang, Henan, China. In 2011, Baiyun Mountain was designated an AAAAA tourist attraction, the highest rating in the Chinese tourist site classification system. Several years before elevation to the top ranks of tourist attractions, Baiyun Mountain had been downright obscure, only becoming more popular after a surprise listing in a 2005 issue of Chinese National Geography as among the "Top 10 Most Beautiful Tourist Attractions in China".
