= Qin Lake Scenic Area =

Scenic area in Jiangsu, China

Qin Lake Scenic Area is located in Jiangsu province Taizhou City. And it takes about two hours to go there from Shanghai.

Qin Lake (溱湖) is 1.4 kilometers in length, with an area of about 3500 acres around. In the scenic area, lakes and rivers aoccupy about thirty seven percent of the total area of the scenic area. Among these lakes, Qin Lake has the largest scale, it is also named the Magpie lake because many magpies gather there every Spring. Qin Lake is rich in fish, diamond Lotus root and watermelon and pollution-free green food. Fishcakes and shrimp balls made in Qin lake are very delicious, they have a famous name--"Qin lake double off" (溱湖双绝). Every year on the Qingming Festival, there will be a Boat festival. Many boats will compete on Qin Lake. The Qin Lake Boat Festival and the Water-Sprinkling Festival and other famous activities are approved to be The ten top folk activities.

There are also foods famous for Qin Lake--”Qin lake eight fresh”(溱湖八鲜), which consists of: Qin lake Duan crab (溱湖簖蟹), Qin lake turtle (溱湖甲鱼), Qin lake icefish (溱湖银鱼), Qin lake shrimp (溱湖青虾), Qin lake birds (溱湖水禽), Qin lake screw shell (溱湖螺贝), Qin lake or four (溱湖四喜) and Qin lake greenstuffs (溱湖水蔬). All of which have distinguishing features.
