= Changcheng System =

Geological formation

The Changcheng System is a Mesoproterozoic geological formation which has yielded primitive fossil eukaryotes, such as Tappania. It formed around 1.9–1.8 billion years ago as a result of a continental collision in the North China Craton.
