= Taihangshan Gorge =

Gorge in Shanxi, China

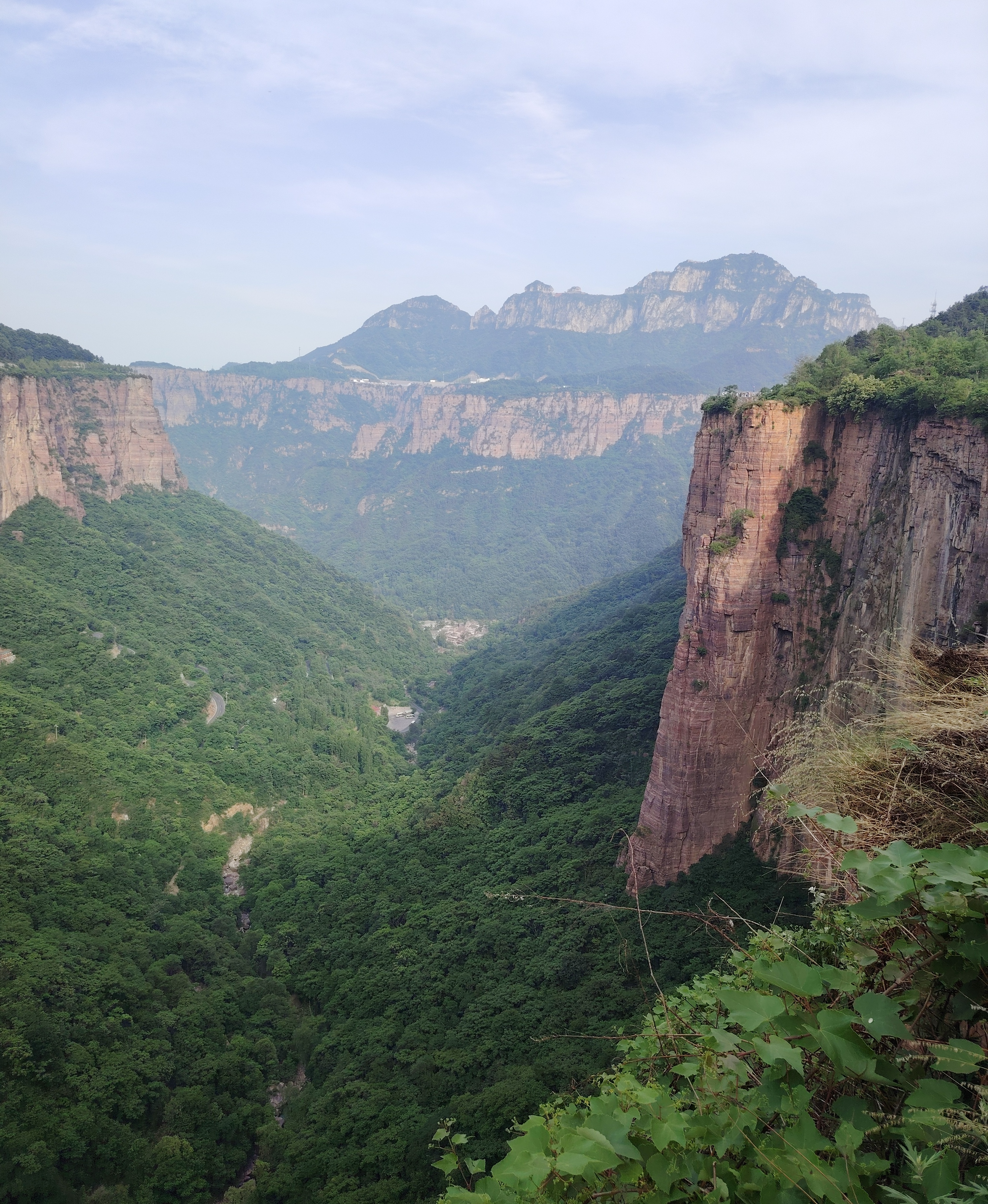
Taihangshan Gorge

Taihangshan Gorge (simplified Chinese: 太行山大峡谷; traditional Chinese: 太行山大峽谷; pinyin: Tàihángshān Dàxiágǔ) is located in the Shanxi province of China. It is a famous scenic spot, and has been honoured as one of the top ten gorges of China. It is a part of Taihangshan Valley National Forest Park, which covers 44 beauty spots and includes cliffs, forests and temples.
