= Boundary Island (Hainan) =

Island in Hainan, China

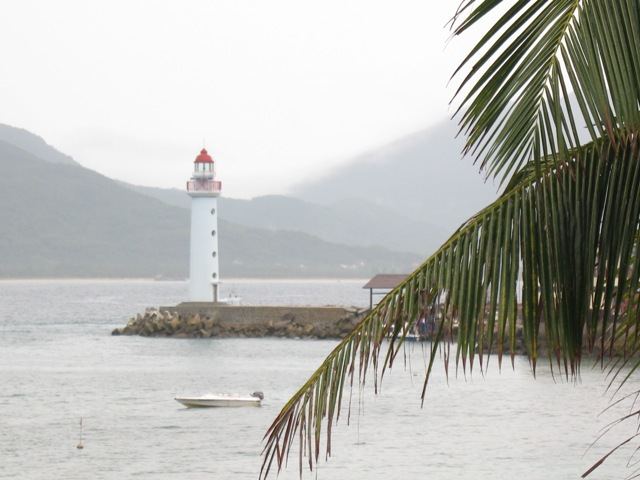
Boundary Island Light House

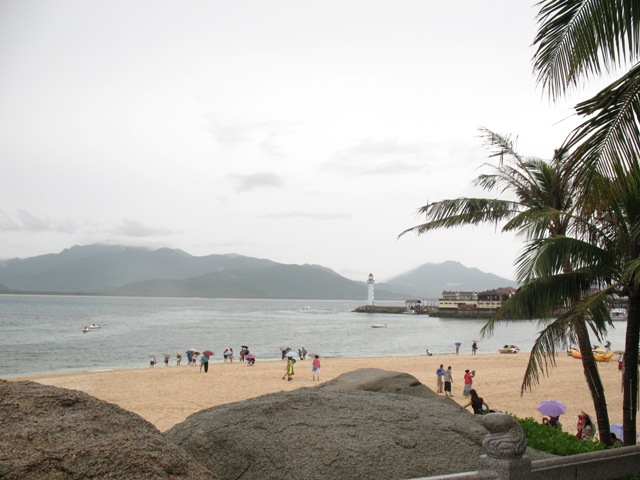
Boundary Island Beach

Boundary Island (Chinese:分界洲) is an island in Lingshui County, Hainan, China, located just off the south-east coast of Hainan Island, between Lingshui and Wanning, in Riyue Bay at 18.57864°N 110.195381°E.

It is the earliest development of an open uninhabited tourist type area. In 2008 it became a national 4A level scenic spot, and in 2013 was promoted to national 5A-class tourist attraction, becoming China's first.
