= Jiguan Cave =

Cave in Luoyang, Henan, China

Jiguan Cave (鸡冠洞) is located at Luoyang city in Henan province, China. This cave is on the side of the Jiguan mountain, a branch of Funiu Mountains, at an altitude of 1201 meters. Jiguan Cave was formed about 600 million years ago and was discovered in the Qianlong period of the Qing dynasty. In August 1992, Jiguan Cave was developed, completed on March 31, 1993, and it opened up in April 1993.

Jiguan Cave is a limestone cave, mainly consisting of stalactites and stalagmites. It is geologically described as a karst landform. This cave reaches a length of 5600 meters, the vertical stratification is five, and it drops 138 meters. There are 1800 meters, and 2300 square meters for travelling. The cave is naturally air conditioned to 18°C in all seasons.
