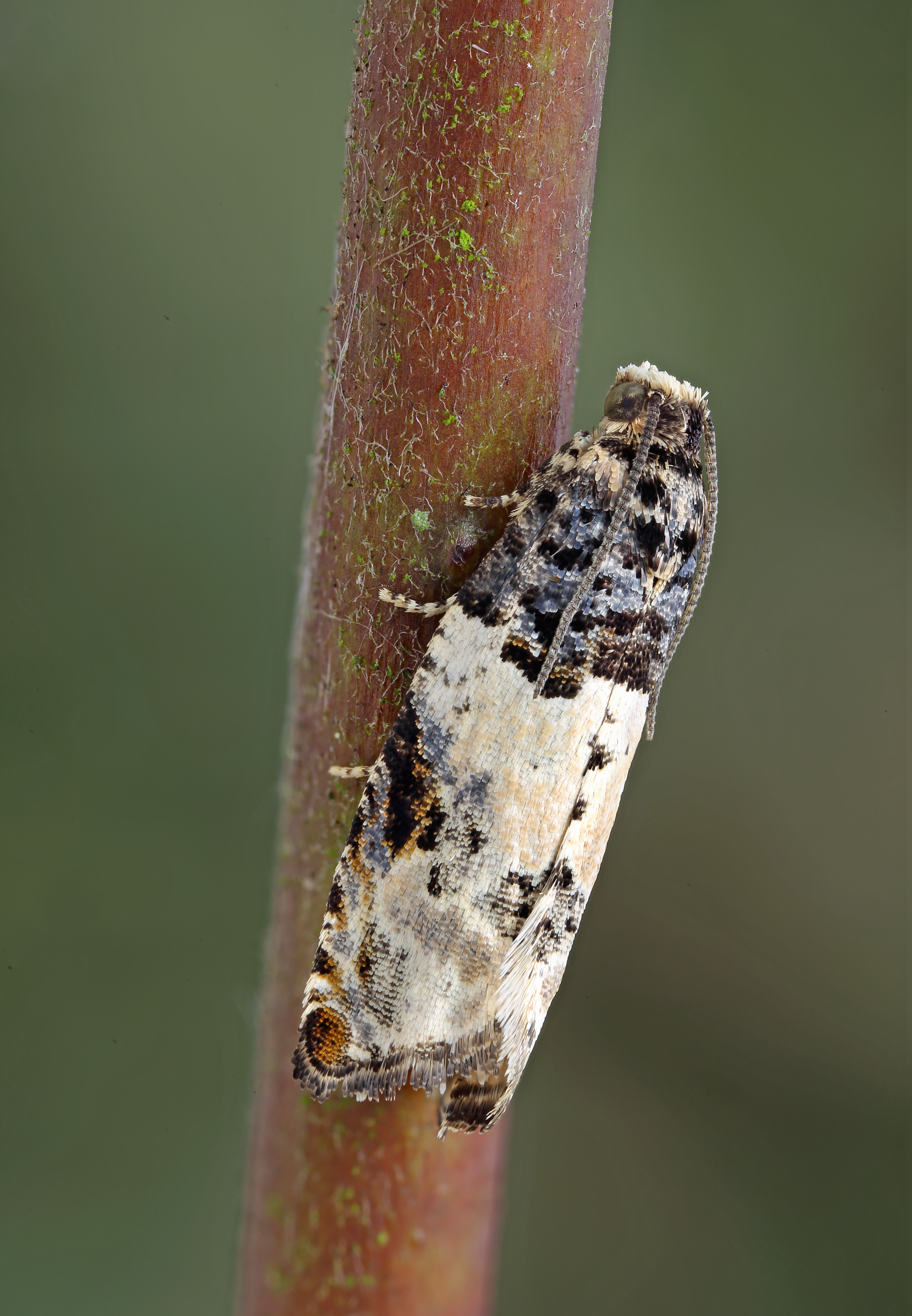

Scientific classification
- Kingdom: Animalia
- Phylum: Arthropoda
- Clade: Pancrustacea
- Class: Insecta
- Order: Lepidoptera
- Family: Tortricidae
- Genus: Gypsonoma
- Species: G. sociana

Binomial name
- Gypsonoma sociana (Haworth, [1811])

Synonyms
- Tortrix sociana Haworth, [1811]; Penthina neglectana Duponchel in Godart, 1842

= Gypsonoma sociana =

Species of moth

Gypsonoma sociana is a moth of the family Tortricidae. It is found from Europe to Russia, China (Henan, Gansu) and Japan.

The wingspan is 12–15 mm. Adults are on wing from July to August.

The larvae burrows into a twig of a Populus or Salix species (including Salix sachalinensis and Salix raddeana) and later occupies a leaf bud.
