= Sarcogyne saphyniana =

Scientific classification
- Kingdom: Fungi
- Division: Ascomycota
- Class: Lecanoromycetes
- Order: Acarosporales
- Family: Acarosporaceae
- Genus: Sarcogyne
- Species: S. saphyniana

Binomial name
- Sarcogyne saphyniana L.Nurtai, K.Knudsen & A.Abbas (2016)
- Type locality: Tianshan Grand Canyon, China

Species of lichen-forming fungus

Sarcogyne saphyniana is a species of lichen-forming fungus in the family Acarosporaceae. It is a small, pale brown, rock-dwelling (saxicolous) crustose lichen known from mountainous areas of Xinjiang in northwestern China. The species was described in 2016 and is distinguished by the unusual structure of its algal layer, in which bands of fungal tissue divide the algae into distinct clumps.

== Taxonomy ==
Sarcogyne saphyniana was described as a new species in 2016 from mountainous Xinjiang in northwestern China. It was placed in the Acarospora badiofusca group of Sarcogyne-like lichens, and is distinguished from Acarospora badiofusca by the structure of the photobiont layer: in S. saphyniana the algal layer is broken up by broad bands of fungal hyphae, which divide the algae into palisade-like patches and clumps. The holotype was collected on sandstone in the Tianshan Grand Canyon (Xinjiang) at 2,257 m elevation on 10 July 2014.

The specific epithet saphyniana honours Saphyn, described by the authors as a wise man from the Tatar Republic who came to Xinjiang in 1910 and helped establish a school there.

== Description ==
The thallus is crustose and forms small, discrete units that are squamulose to areolate (scale-like to cracked into angular patches). Individual areoles or squamules are round to angular and may overlap slightly; they measure about 0.3–2.1 mm across and are roughly 400–800 μm thick. The upper surface is usually pale brown (sometimes darker), smooth, and lacks pruina; it can be slightly shiny. The lower surface is dark and corticate, and the thallus is attached by a stipe-like base.

Apothecia (fruiting bodies) are lecideine in form (with a margin formed by the proper exciple rather than thallus tissue) and develop as emergent discs that project above the thallus as they mature. Typically 1–4 apothecia occur per thallus unit. They are 0.3–1.4 mm wide, with a reddish-brown disc that may become fissured. The margin is blackish-brown or the same colour as the disc. Microscopically, the hymenium is 66–80 μm high and stains blue with iodine (I+ blue). Ascospores are hyaline, simple, broadly ellipsoid, and measure 3.5–5.5 × 2–2.5 μm. Pycnidia were not observed, and thin-layer chromatography did not detect secondary metabolites.

== Habitat and distribution ==
Sarcogyne saphyniana is saxicolous, growing directly on rock. The type collection was made on sandstone, and additional specimens were recorded from both sandstone and shale. Known localities are in Xinjiang (northwestern China), including sites in the Tianshan Mountains and the Altai Mountains.

The reported elevation range spans roughly 917–2,257 m. Within China, the authors noted that several other Sarcogyne species had previously been reported, with multiple records from Xinjiang, and S. saphyniana adds to the documented diversity of the genus in that region.
