= Tianshan Grand Canyon =

Scenic area in Ürümqi County, Xinjiang

Coordinates: 43°23′22″N 87°23′31″E

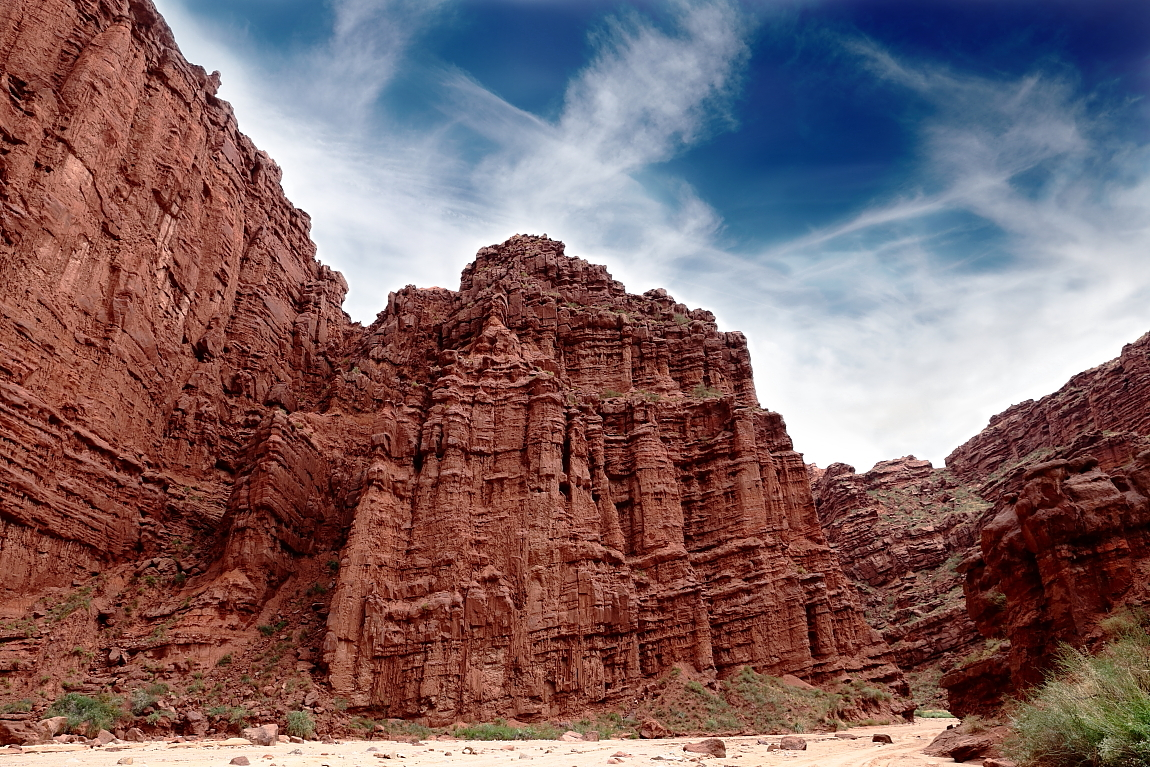
Tianshan Grand Canyon

Tianshan Grand Canyon is a natural scenic area located within Ürümqi County in Xinjiang Uygur Autonomous Region. It is a national forest park and also a 5A-level scenic spot in China.More than 40 kilometers from Ürümqi urban area, the total area of the scenic spot is 1038.48 square kilometers, the average altitude is more than 2000 meters, and the average annual temperature is 4-6 °C.

== Geography ==
Tianshan Grand Canyon is located in the middle of the Tianshan Mountains in the Northern Foothills of the Karavucheng Mountains, between Bogda Peak and Tanger Peak, the northern Junggar Basin, the average elevation of 2000 meters. Administrative divisions, Tianshan Grand Canyon is located in Ürümqi County, across Banfanggou Township, Tori Township and Shuixigou Township, about 48 kilometers from Ürümqi urban area. Tianshan Grand Canyon Scenic Area has a total area of 1038.48 square kilometers. The Grand Canyon is about 50 kilometers north–south, north of Banfanggou Township Forest Pipe Station, and south of Toksun County. It is about 43 kilometers east–west, 103 provincial roads to the east, and 216 national roads to the west.

The Grand Canyon has both high mountains and mountain basins. The land of the great canyon is complicated, that is, there are vertical and horizontal ravines, and there are ups and downs of the mountains. The Tianshan Grand Canyon is composed of three mountain ranges perpendicular to the main vein of Tianshan Mountain. It is composed of high mountains, low mountains and low hills in the south. The highest peak in the Grand Canyon is 5222.4 meters above sea level. It consists of metamorphic rocks such as gneiss, mica, quartzite, white square rock and magmatic rocks such as granite and granite porphyry. The Tianshan Grand Canyon belongs to the continental arid climate of the northern temperate zone. The sun is long, the temperature difference between day and night is large, and the water is rich. The average annual temperature in the Grand Canyon is 4 to 6 degrees Celsius, the average temperature in winter is about -15 degrees Celsius, and the average temperature in summer is about 21 degrees Celsius. The frost-free period is 150 to 160 days.65% of the annual precipitation in the basin occurs in spring and summer, while only 5% in winter. The average annual precipitation in the Grand Canyon is 330 mm to 600 mm. The annual evaporation of water in the Tianshan Grand Canyon is only 500 to 900 mm in the mountains, while the flat principle is as high as 1,300 to 1,500 mm.

The main source of surface water in the Tianshan Grand Canyon is glaciers and permanent snow in the Tianshan Mountains due to atmospheric precipitation. The main rivers in the Tianshan Grand Canyon are the Ürümqi River. The seasonal rivers formed by glaciers and snow flow north and south through the Grand Canyon. Within the Grand Canyon is a Ti-Hung trench, which rises at an altitude of 4,380 meters above sea level and is replenished by precipitation and 26 glacial meltwater. The area has glaciers covering an area of more than 8 square kilometres and water catchment area of more than 300 square kilometres. On the basis of this ditch, the Zhaobishan Reservoir, which has become the main water source in the downstream agricultural and pastoral areas, has been built. The total capacity of Zhaobi Mountain Reservoir exceeds 7.5 million cubic meters, and the design water level is nearly 1900 meters. The groundwater of Tianshan Grand Canyon is divided into mountainous groundwater mainly composed of bedrock fissure water and plain groundwater mainly composed of Quaternary pore water.

== Biological resources ==
The fertile land of the Tianshan Grand Canyon makes the vertical distribution of the area obvious. Brown calcium soil, mountain chestnut calcium soil, gray brown forest soil, black calcium soil and meadow soil are distributed from the foot of the mountain to the top of the mountain respectively. The vertical zone from the foothills to the top of the mountain includes shrubland belt, forest shrubland belt, subalpine forest grassland belt, subalpine meadow belt and alpine gravel meadow belt. The Tianshan Grand Canyon has more than 1,100 species of wild plants. The dominant tree species in the core area of the Tianshan Grand Canyon Scenic Area is the Schrenk's spruce. Additionally, coniferous plants in the area include Siberian larch, Xinjiang juniper, Changbai larch, Scots pine, Hami larch, and Chinese pine.

Below the conifers, secondary forests in the montane zone commonly feature willow family plants such as Salix alba, Populus davidiana, Salix viminalis, Salix xerophila, Salix pentandra, and Salix raddeana, as well as elm family plants like Ulmus laevis. In the low mountain belt, rose family plants are prevalent, including Spiraea hypericifolia, Rosa acicularis, Rosa spinosissima, Rosa laxa, Rosa beggeriana, Sorbus tianschanica, Cotoneaster multiflorus, and Crataegus species, along with honeysuckle family plants such as Lonicera hispidla, Lonicera microphylla, and Lonicera caerulea. Other plants growing in the canyon include Weigela middendorffiana, Ribes diacanthum, Caragana stenophylla, Caragana spinosa, and Clematis songarica. Common grasses in the canyon include Geranium pratense, Sanguisorba officinalis, Poa pratensis, Thalictrum minus, Fragaria species, and Rubus saxatilis. Additionally, wild medicinal herbs such as Plantago species, Saussurea involucrata, Glycyrrhiza uralensis, Ligularia sibirica, and Ephedra species grow abundantly in the subalpine and montane zones, as well as the shrub-steppe belt of the Tianshan Grand Canyon. The Tianshan Grand Canyon is home to 5 orders, 15 families, 26 genera, and 81 known species of lichens. The dominant family is Parmeliaceae, with 17 species across 4 genera. The dominant genus is Xanthoparmelia, with 12 species, followed by Rhizoplaca with 10 species and Hypogymnia with 8 species.

The Tianshan Grand Canyon is also a haven for many wild animals, including 32 species of mammals, 144 species of birds, and 181 species of vertebrates. Among them, six species are listed as national first-class protected animals, including the snow leopard, Siberian ibex, and golden eagle. Additionally, 24 species are listed as national second-class protected animals, such as the red deer, argali, steppe eagle, and griffon vulture.

== Introduction ==
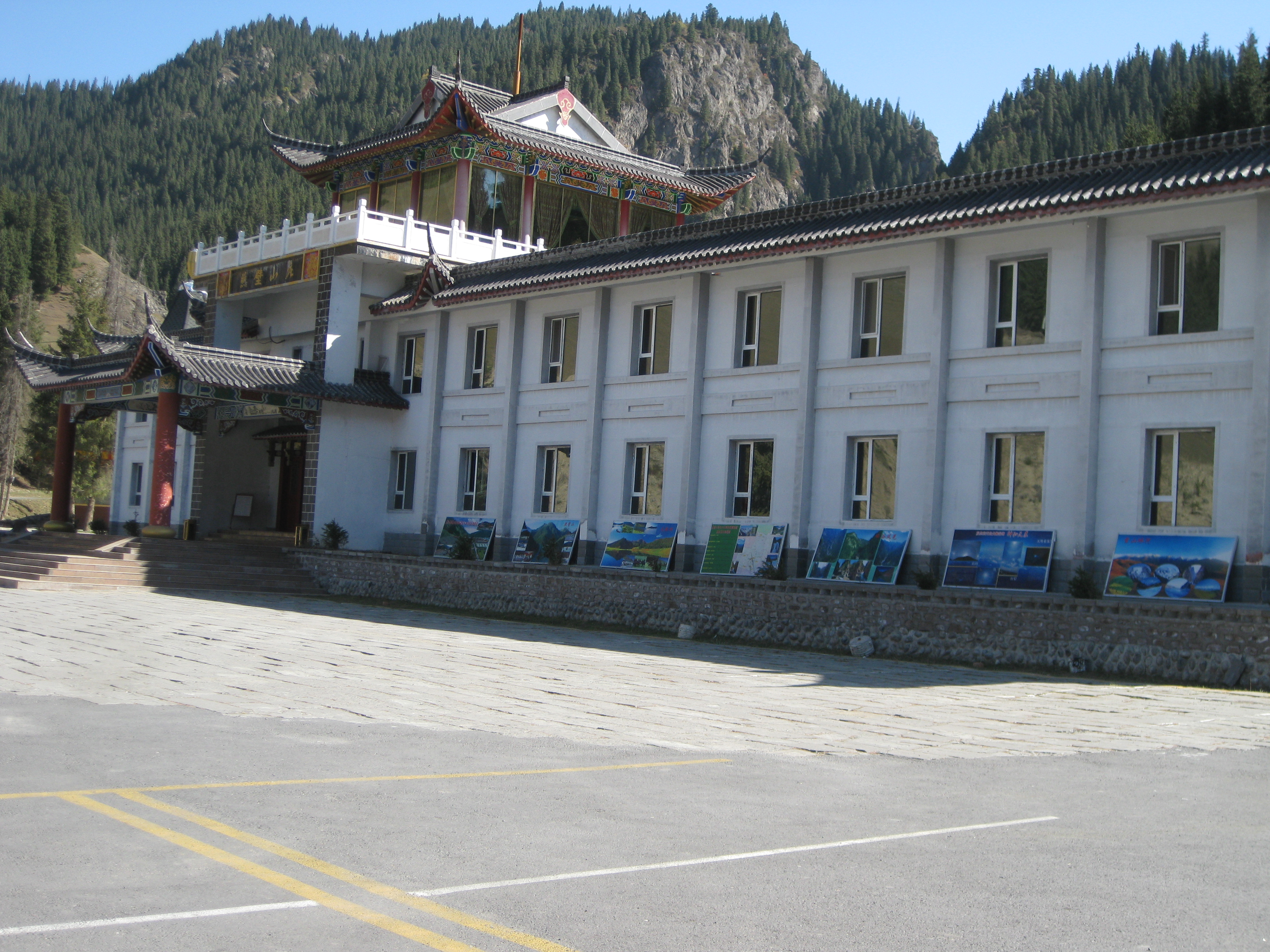
Zhaobi Mountain Villa

Tianshan Grand Canyon is a scenic area group primarily centered around Zhaobi Mountain Scenic Area. Within the scenic area are two lakes, three waterfalls, four streams, and eighteen valleys, with each attraction complementing the others. Zhaobi Mountain Scenic Area features eight main attractions: Zhaobi Mountain, Bilong Bay, Tianshan Dam, Tianshui Lake, Tianmen (Heaven's Gate), Qiaoya Grassland, Gasda Slope, and Twelve Linked Lakes. Reception facilities in the area include a visitor center, Tianshan Grand Canyon Hotel, Zhaobi Mountain Villa, reception hall, and several yurts.

=== Main attractions ===
Zhaobi Mountain is a pyramid-shaped mountain with a northeast and southwest orientation and a height of about 400 meters surrounded by water on three sides. The south side of Zhaobi Mountain is a valley more than 10 kilometers long, with cliffs on both sides, and only a line of blue sky can be seen from the valley. Both sides of the valley are thickly wooded, and wild animals often haunt it. Because its steep mountains are affected by sunlight and reflected light from the river, they often appear golden and blue, similar to the walls of the ancient royal residence. There is also a myth and legend about the formation of the scenic Zhaoqi Mountain. On the way to the city, he met seven serpents. The serpent wanted to fight, and Wukong pulled out a piece of sweat and turned into a fairy fruit thrown here. When the serpent and the serpent set themselves apart, the serpent turned to the mountain. To the east of the wall is Gasdasaka. In the center of Gasdasaka is a crescent-shaped lake with an area of about 1 hectare.

Swan Lake is a lake located in a mountain meadow 2449 meters above sea level. Every summer and autumn, swans float in the lake. In 2018, four black swans were introduced from the city of Kuhler, where they often live. Legend has it that a Kazakh girl suffered for three days and three nights because her lover died in battle, and tears finally gathered to form Swan Lake. Swan Lake east is an area of nearly 30,000 acres of Qiaoya meadow, Qiaoya meadow more than 2,500 meters above sea level, is a subalpine meadow viewing area. Legend has it that the site once belonged to an elder named Joa, so this pasture is called Joa Grassland. The owners of this pasture are now Kazakh herders. In summer, the grass of Rheinland is covered with white felt houses and herds of cattle and sheep. In winter, it becomes the heaviest winter snow canyon in the Namsan area, and Joa Grassland becomes a better place for winter snow and ice tourism. The Sky Gate overlooks the entire Swan Lake and Joya meadow. Tianmen attractions at an altitude of more than 2700 meters, as the highest altitude in the scenic spot, here is also the most extensive scenic spot. From here, one can see the continuous snow mountain glaciers, and can also see the unique scenery of the Tianshan Cloud Sea in the Grand Canyon Scenic Area.

Tianshan Dam and Bi Long Bay are both scenic spots formed by Zhaobi Mountain Reservoir. The main structures of Zhaobi Mountain Reservoir are composed of a dam, a diversionary discharge sand cave and an extraordinary spillway. The dam type is asphalt concrete core wall rockfill dam, with a total storage capacity of 7.532 million cubic meters, Xingli Kuang is 5.5775 million cubic meters, the top elevation of the dam is 1902 meters, the maximum height of 71 meters. Construction of the Zhaobi Mountain Reservoir began in October 2003 and passed the water storage phase inspection in June 2007. The construction of Zhaobi Mountain Reservoir provides support for the population and livestock water in Banfanggou Township downstream. The seasonal water shortage in Banfanggou irrigation area is solved by reservoir regulation. In addition, the construction of the reservoir also solves the problem of flood control and soil erosion downstream. Tianshan Dam is the dam of the Zhaobishan Reservoir, which commemorates the designer's contribution to the construction of the dam for three years, so it is named Tianshan Dam. Bi Long Bay is named Bi Long Bay because when the reservoir is full, it resembles a Bi Long Bay. The top of the Tianshan Dam is the best place to see the scenery of Bi Long Bay and Zhaobi Mountain.

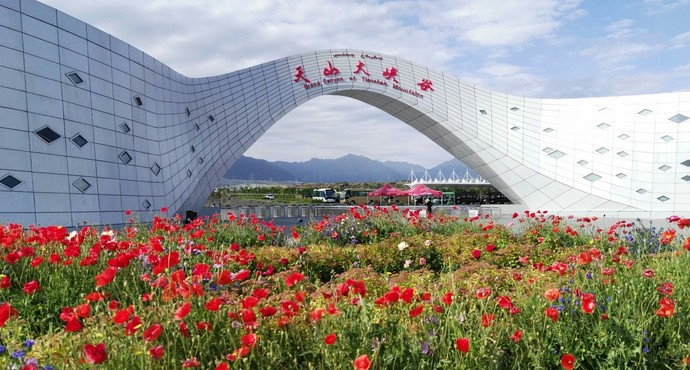

In 2015, the water conservancy project construction management station of Ürümqi County Hydro-forestry Administration began to renovate the river from the Wishan Reservoir to the south brigade base. The river itself is a drainage channel, and on the basis of ensuring its drainage effect, the landscapes on both sides of the river are beautified. The renovated drainage channel and 12 connected artificial landscape lakes together form the attraction of Twelve Lian Lake. Twelve Lian Lake runs through the entire Tianshan Grand Canyon Scenic Area, not only as an attraction. Seepage-resistant drainage channels and landscape lakes also mitigate potential hazards from river flooding.

=== Other attractions ===
There are also attractions in the scenic area where one can experience the life and traditional culture of Kazakhstan and other ethnic groups. There are six major ethnic groups living in the Grand Canyon. Most of them are Kazakh herdsmen, and there are many Kazakh tribes that maintain Kazakh traditional productive lifestyles and traditional customs and culture, and their pastures. The Tianshan Grand Canyon is also known as the "Museum of Nomadic Culture". In the Tianshan Grand Canyon, one can also experience Kazakh customs such as chasing girls and singing Akon. If it happens to coincide with the festival of Nawmiz, Gurban or Eid, there will be more events in the Kazakh-style area of the Grand Canyon. In addition, one can also taste the special food of Han, Hui and other ethnic groups in the scenic area. In addition, the Tianshan Grand Canyon Scenic Area introduced 25 entertainment programs in 2016, including children's excavators, bumper cars, balance cars, expansion equipment, pedal boats, underwater rollers, water bicycles, cruise ships and so on.

In addition, there are many other scenic spots and attractions within the forest park planning area. Including Eagle Grove Scenic Area, attractions have forest green. Shagou scenic spots include waterfall, Shagou Darban. Nantaizi tourist attractions, including the tomb of Nantaizi. The attractions of the Temple Gutter tourist area are Temple Gutter Falls. Pingxi Liangzi Tourist Area has Silk Road Ski Resort, Baiyun Ski Resort, Shuxigou Ski Resort and Sunshine Ski Resort. As well as Yangguanggou Scenic Area, East Baiyanggou Scenic Area, Alfalfa Terrace Scenic Area, Zhangjiagou Scenic Area, etc.

=== History, selection, and events ===
Tianshan Grand Canyon has a long history as a tourist attraction. In the Tang Dynasty, it was a hunting area. In the Qing Dynasty, this place was famous for its pastures and summer resorts. After the founding of the People's Republic of China, the Tianshan Grand Canyon was also continuously developed as a scenic spot. In 1993, Zhaobi Mountain in the Tianshan Grand Canyon was rated as a national forest park. Zhaobi Mountain National Forest Park is also the first national forest park in Xinjiang. Zhaobishan National Forest Park has a planned area of 144,389 hectares. The planned area includes the area of Banfanggou Forest Farm and overlaps with the Nanshan Scenic Area. In January 2014, Tianshan Grand Canyon won the title of the seventh national AAAAA scenic spot after Kanas Lake, Cocoto Sea, Tianshan Tianchi, Grape Grove, Narati Prairie, Zepkin Huyanglin, and the first Ürümqi scenic spot to receive this title. In February 2014, the State Forestry Administration granted the change of name to "Tianshan Grand Canyon National Forest Park". In 2016, Xinjiang Zhaobi Mountain National Wetland Park passed the field visit and evaluation. The total area is 749.27 hectares. In 2017, the State Forestry Administration issued the Notice of the Office of the State Forestry Administration on the Promotion of a Batch of Typical Ice and Snow Tourism Units, and the Grand Canyon of Tianshan became the only typical ice and snow tourism unit in Xinjiang. In 2019, in order to control human disturbances to the landscape and ecology of forest parks and ensure the safety and comfort of tourists, the plan of Xinjiang Tianshan Grand Canyon National Forest Park was approved by the State Forestry and Grassland Administration. Planned for 2018–2027, the park's control indicators require a daily capacity of 38,000 passengers and a forest area of no less than 63,155 hectares.

Tianshan Grand Canyon used to be the host of different theme activities such as environmental protection, disaster prevention and mitigation. In May 2017, Xinjiang's 36th "Bird Week" and "Wetland Publicity Day" jointly organized by Xinjiang Institute of Environmental Protection Science, Xinjiang Tianshan Eastern State-owned Forestry Administration, Ürümqi Banfanggou Branch and Xinjiang Bird Watching Association were launched. In December 2017, the launching ceremony of Xinjiang Tianshan Snow Leopard Conservation and Management Public Welfare Project jointly issued by the East State Forestry Administration of Tianshan and the Beijing Qiaoyu Public Welfare Foundation was also held in Tianshan Grand Canyon. In May 2020, the Forestry and Prairie Bureau of Xinjiang Uyghur Autonomous Region and the State Forestry and Prairie Bureau in Ürümqi Forest Resources Supervision Commissioner jointly launched a forest grassland fire prevention campaign in Tianshan Grand Canyon.

== Controversy ==
=== Herdsman and tourism company ===
Tianshan Grand Canyon Scenic Area overlaps with the pastures of local herdsmen. At the time of tourism development, expropriation and compensation of settlements and pastures of local residents were carried out. In 2008, Ürümqi Tianshan Grand Canyon Scenic Area Management Group Co., Ltd. (formerly known as Ürümqi Tianshan Grand Canyon Resort Tourism Co., Ltd.) signed a "grass management agreement" with 47 of the 50 pastoralists. Later, eight pastoralists gave up their business, and the company subsidized 10,000 yuan a year for each household with a felt room and a horse, and compensated by increasing 1,000 yuan every three years. The agreement stipulates that local residents operate one horse per felt house. However, as the number of tourists increased, a felt room and a horse could not meet the demand, and some herders built felt rooms to receive tourists, which disrupted the planning of the scenic spot, resulting in frequent conflicts between the company and the herdsmen.

Three of the five non-signed pastoralists operate felt houses and rental horses in violation of the agreement, and two have not signed a cooperative management agreement because they have not grazed in the scenic spot. In addition, the pastoralists who signed the agreement also because of the large households divided into small households, resulting in the addition of 50 households and 198 pastoralists in the scenic area. The Tianshan Grand Canyon Company has not resettled these herdsmen. The inaction of the company caused losses to the interests of herdsmen, while creating new contradictions and problems.

=== Battle of management ===
Since 2017, Ürümqi Tianshan Grand Canyon Scenic Area Management Group Co., Ltd. and the Ürümqi County Government have caused controversy over the operation and management of Tianshan Grand Canyon Scenic Area. In November 2005, Ürümqi Tianshan Grand Canyon Resort Tourism Co., Ltd. and Ürümqi County Government signed the "Tianshan Grand Canyon (Zhaobi Mountain) Scenic Tourism Commitment Agreement", which stipulates that the company is engaged in tourism, hospitality and property management. Initially, the company had 20%, about 4 million yuan of state-owned capital, at a discounted price of a small building in the scenic area. Since then, the company has undertaken the development of scenic spots, including the construction of infrastructure, restaurants, entertainment and other facilities. In 2008, the site was officially opened to the public.

In 2010, the scenic spot began to create a national AAAAA-level scenic spot and won the title in 2013.The incident also became the beginning of the Tianshan Grand Canyon Company and Ürümqi County Government management competition for scenic spots. First, the differences in project construction. During the establishment of 5A scenic spot, the Ürümqi County Government invested in the tourist center, the road in front of the tourist center, the bridge in the scenic area and the "Twelve Lianhu" project. For why these projects were not handed over to Ürümqi Tianshan Grand Canyon Scenic Area Management Group Co., Ltd. or other ways to participate, such as capital increase, but directly invested by the county government. The reason given by the county government is that "the company is out of money". Tianshan Grand Canyon Company said it was not out of money, but the county government did not allow it to intervene in the construction of these projects when the company reported on the idea of construction. After 2013, Tianshan Grand Canyon Company was unable to carry out infrastructure projects in the scenic area, and even received a reply that "if it is repaired, it will be destroyed for you".

Second, they were forced to sign an acquisition contract. In the winter of 2016, the construction of a fire escape in the Tianshan Grand Canyon Scenic Area was completed. Although the construction of the passageway was agreed by the Ministry of Forestry, the 3 km in the document was converted to 6 km, and the construction of the passageway caused damage to the surrounding grasslands and vegetation. The matter was criminally investigated by the public security organs. In April 2017, the Xinjiang Uyghur Autonomous Region Housing and Construction Department issued the Notice on Law Enforcement Inspection of Tianshan Natural Heritage Sites and Scenic Areas in 2016.Among them, the management of the Tianshan Grand Canyon scenic spot and the sale of tickets are transferred to the enterprise, and it is clearly illegal for the enterprise to operate. According to the regulations of scenic spots, the author also puts forward the suggestions on the rectification of management rights, management rights and ticket management of scenic spots. Therefore, the Ürümqi County Government and the Nanshan Scenic Area Management Committee of Ürümqi City started the acquisition work. Whenever the company and the government talk about the acquisition, as long as the company provides conditions, the public security organs must summon the company's head for the construction of illegal channels. Although the company has begun to repair the damage caused by the repair of the channel based on the suggestion of rectification. But every time the withdrawal was mentioned, the reply was to annul the 2005 Tianshan Grand Canyon Scenic Tourist Attractions Commitment Agreement and redraft the ticket to the county government to sell the infrastructure to the county government. Finally, in August of the same year, Tianshan Grand Canyon Company and Ürümqi County Government signed the "Tianshan Grand Canyon Operation Enterprise Main Body Optimization Framework Agreement" and "Supplementary Agreement on Tianshan Grand Canyon Management". It is also scheduled that all management services in its scenic area will be managed by the management committee of Nanshan Scenic Area in Ürümqi City on September 10. In response, the Ürümqi County government did not explicitly respond to whether to file a criminal case, and said whether to file a case is different from the acquisition.

Third, the progress of asset evaluation. Before the acquisition agreement is signed, the assets of Tianshan Grand Canyon Company need to be evaluated. The assessment, which was scheduled to be completed by November 1, 2017, was not reviewed until June 2018 by a working group sent by the county government. After a three-month review, the Working Group concluded that the accounts were not clear and needed to be audited first. In August 2018, the county government commissioned an accounting firm to conduct an audit of the company's financial assets. The company believes that its project is clear and that the county government has delayed it for various reasons. The response given by the county government is to quantify the assets of the scenic spot according to law.

Due to this controversy, the operation status of Tianshan Grand Canyon scenic spot is worrying. At present, ticket management is mainly responsible for the Ürümqi County Government and the Nanshan Scenic Area Management Committee, while the interval car and catering services are responsible for the Tianshan Grand Canyon Company. Both sides believe that the other is the beneficiary. Moreover, due to various factors, the operation of the scenic spot has been affected. If the construction of scenic facilities is not in place and the number of tourists is not up to standard, it is likely to face the loss of the title of 5A scenic spot.

=== Development issues ===
The old development concept of scenic spots makes the scenic spots face a lot of development problems. There is little publicity in places such as these. The official website is not up to date, lack of engine links in multiple languages, lack of interaction, etc. This makes it impossible to provide tourist guides in a targeted and timely manner. Second, although there is propaganda about Kazakh culture in the scenic area, it does not form a unified management. In addition, although Kazakh folk culture is also regarded as an important part of the development of the scenic spot, the local pastoralists do not think so. They will only wear their own national costumes when requested by tourists, and traditional events will be held only when requested by tourists. Local residents did not pay attention to the role of national culture in the development of tourism, but to cater to consumers for economic interests, and national culture became an exchange. This situation has an impact on the change and survival of national culture.

In addition, less than one-tenth of senior management is from tourism-related professions. At the same time, the management system of Tianshan Grand Canyon scenic spot is not perfect. This leaves the area facing some management problems. For example, due to seasonal reasons, there are obvious differences in the off-peak season of scenic spots, which has led to occasional idle and sometimes insufficient supply of scenic services. The surge in self-driving tourists during the holiday season poses a challenge to traffic in the scenic area. Scenic areas are also at risk of sanitation and environmental pollution. Herdsmen in the scenic area provide accommodation for tourists, but because the facilities and sanitary conditions are different, tourists face risks when eating. Environmental and resource protection systems are not fully implemented, and areas with concentrated tourist activities face different pressures.
