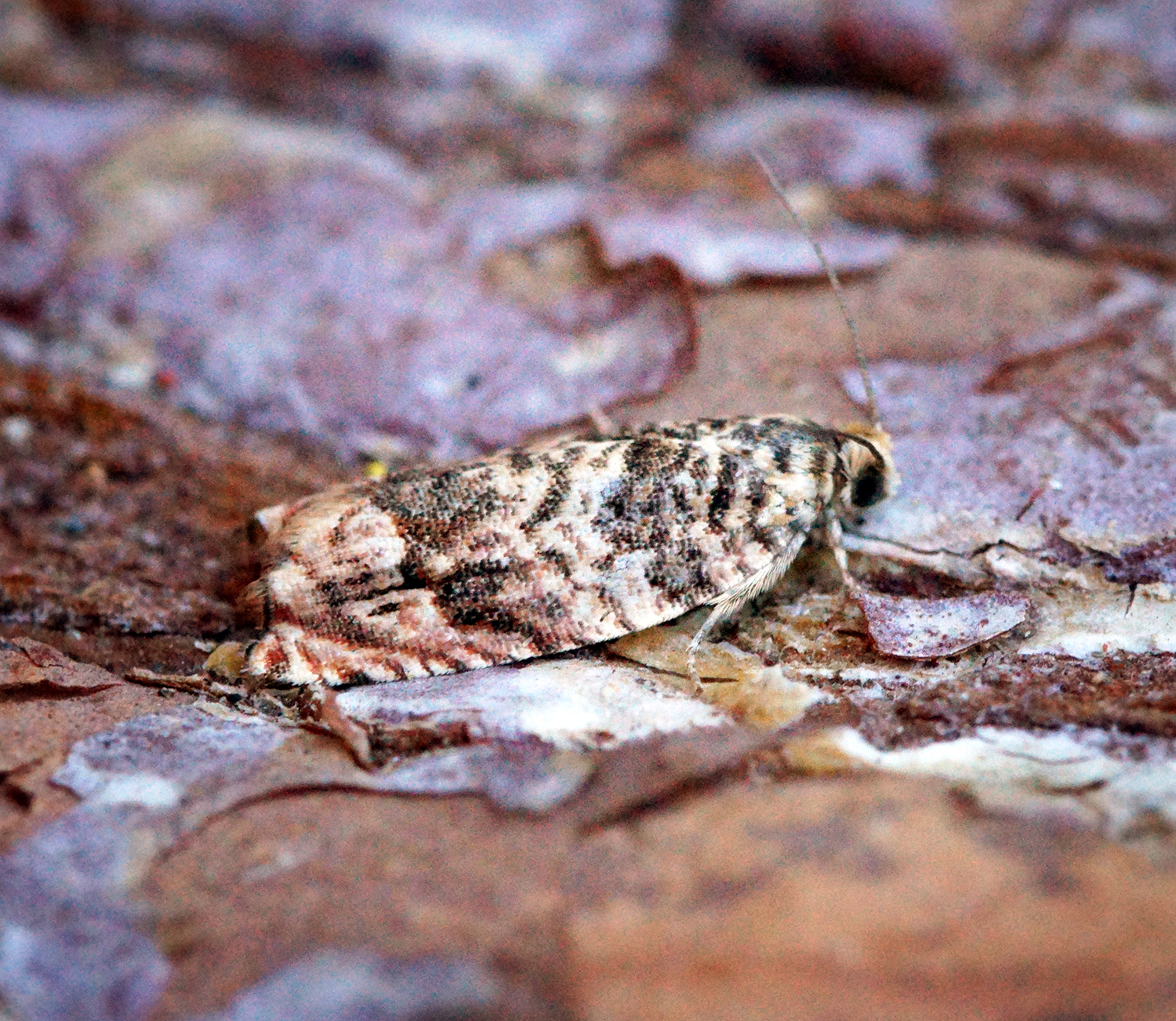

Scientific classification
- Kingdom: Animalia
- Phylum: Arthropoda
- Clade: Pancrustacea
- Class: Insecta
- Order: Lepidoptera
- Family: Tortricidae
- Genus: Gypsonoma
- Species: G. minutana

Binomial name
- Gypsonoma minutana (Hübner, 1799)

Synonyms
- Tortrix minutana Hubner, [1796-1799]; Steganoptycha minutana var. albifasciana Caradja, 1916; Epiblema imparana Muller-Rutz, in Thomann, Standfuss & Muller-Rutz, 1914; Grapholitha paediscana Staudinger, 1859; Grapholitha vermiculana Duponchel, in Godart, 1836

= Gypsonoma minutana =

Species of moth

Gypsonoma minutana, the poplar tortricid, is a moth of the family Tortricidae. It is found in Europe (north up to Finland) and North Africa, Turkey, Transcaucasia, Ural, Kazakhstan, from central Asia to Siberia and eastern Russia, Asia Minor, Iran, Afghanistan, Mongolia, China and Japan.

The wingspan is 12–15 mm. Adults are on wing in July in England. In Japan, there are two to three generations per year (in June, July and August). In Italy, there are two to three generations per year, with adults on wing from late May to mid-June, late July to mid-August and from mid-September to late October.

The larvae feed on Populus nigra, Populus alba and Populus tremula.
