= Gypsonoma phaeocremna =

Scientific classification
- Kingdom: Animalia
- Phylum: Arthropoda
- Class: Insecta
- Order: Lepidoptera
- Family: Tortricidae
- Genus: Gypsonoma
- Species: G. phaeocremna

Binomial name
- Gypsonoma phaeocremna (Meyrick, 1937)

Synonyms
- Eucosma phaeocremna Meyrick, 1937

Species of moth

Gypsonoma phaeocremna is a species of moth of the family Tortricidae. It is found in China (Sichuan, Guizhou, Yunnan, Gansu, Shaanxi, Ningxia).
