= Gypsonoma anthracitis =

Scientific classification
- Kingdom: Animalia
- Phylum: Arthropoda
- Class: Insecta
- Order: Lepidoptera
- Family: Tortricidae
- Genus: Gypsonoma
- Species: G. anthracitis

Binomial name
- Gypsonoma anthracitis Meyrick, 1912

Species of moth

Gypsonoma anthracitis is a moth of the family Tortricidae first described by Edward Meyrick in 1912. It is found in Sri Lanka.
