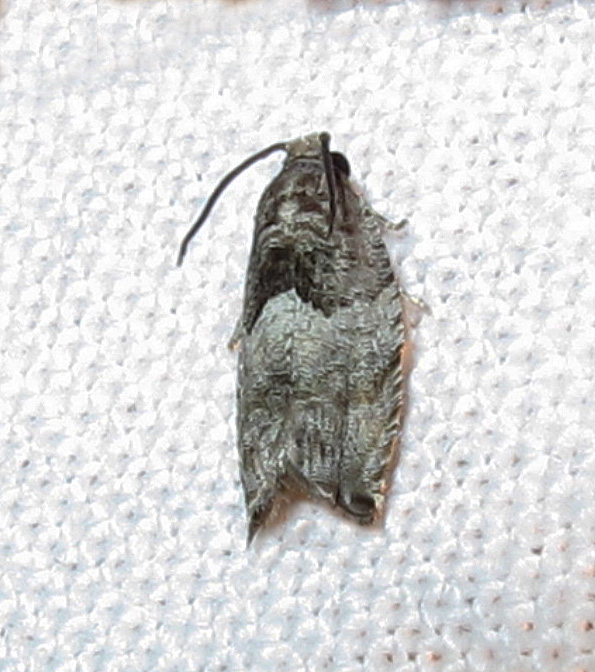

Scientific classification
- Kingdom: Animalia
- Phylum: Arthropoda
- Class: Insecta
- Order: Lepidoptera
- Family: Tortricidae
- Genus: Gypsonoma
- Species: G. haimbachiana

Binomial name
- Gypsonoma haimbachiana (Kearfott, 1907)

Synonyms
- Epinotia haimbachiana Kearfott, 1907

= Gypsonoma haimbachiana =

Species of moth

Gypsonoma haimbachiana, the cottonwood twig borer, is a moth of the family Tortricidae. It is found in eastern North America, from Canada to the Gulf Coast of the United States and west to Missouri.

The wingspan is 13–17 mm. Adults are ash grey. There are four or more generations per year in the southern part of their range.

The larvae feed on Populus sect. Aigeiros and other Populus species.

== Etymology ==
The species is named for Frank Haimbach, who collected the first specimens in Cincinnati, Ohio.

== Gallery ==
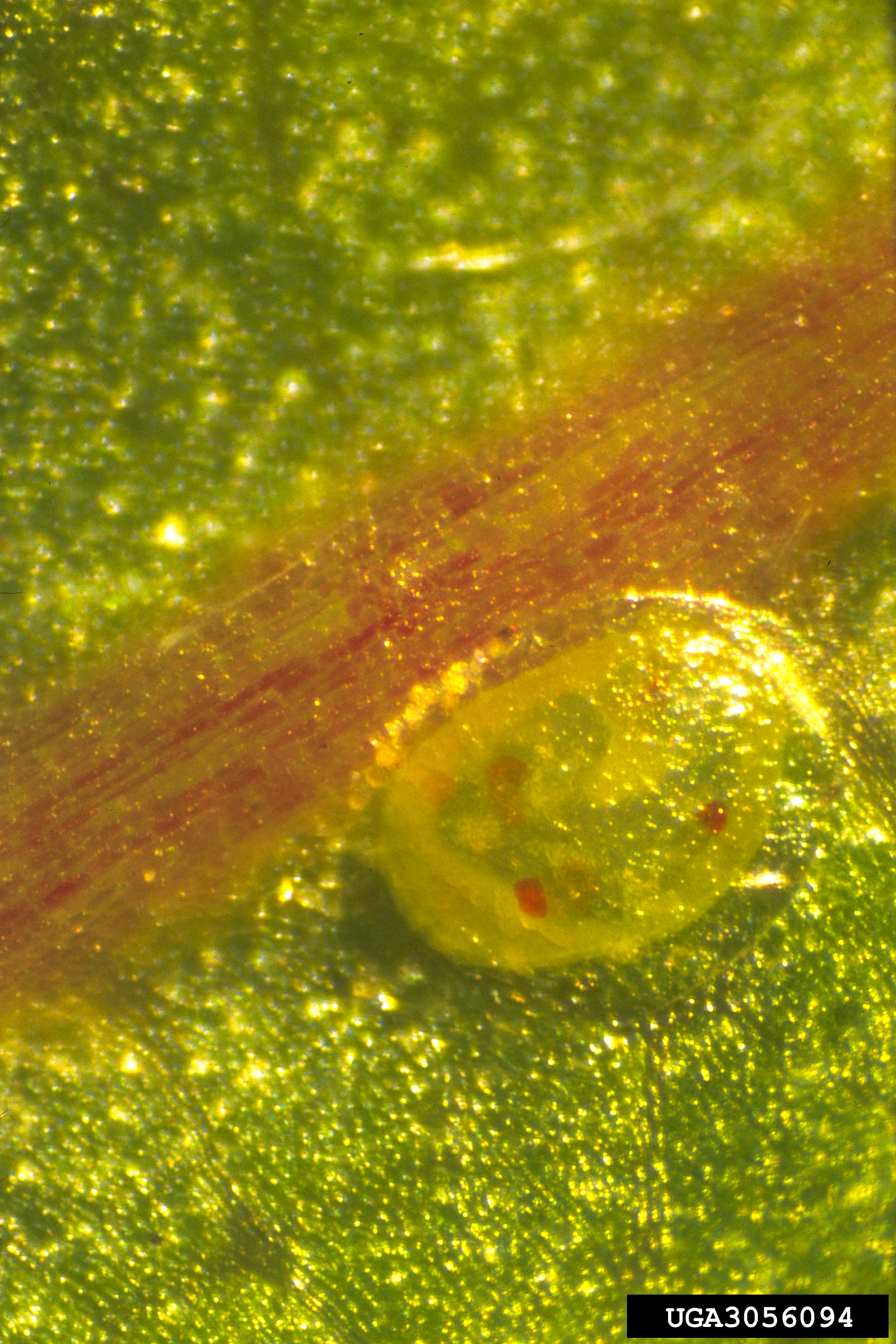
Egg

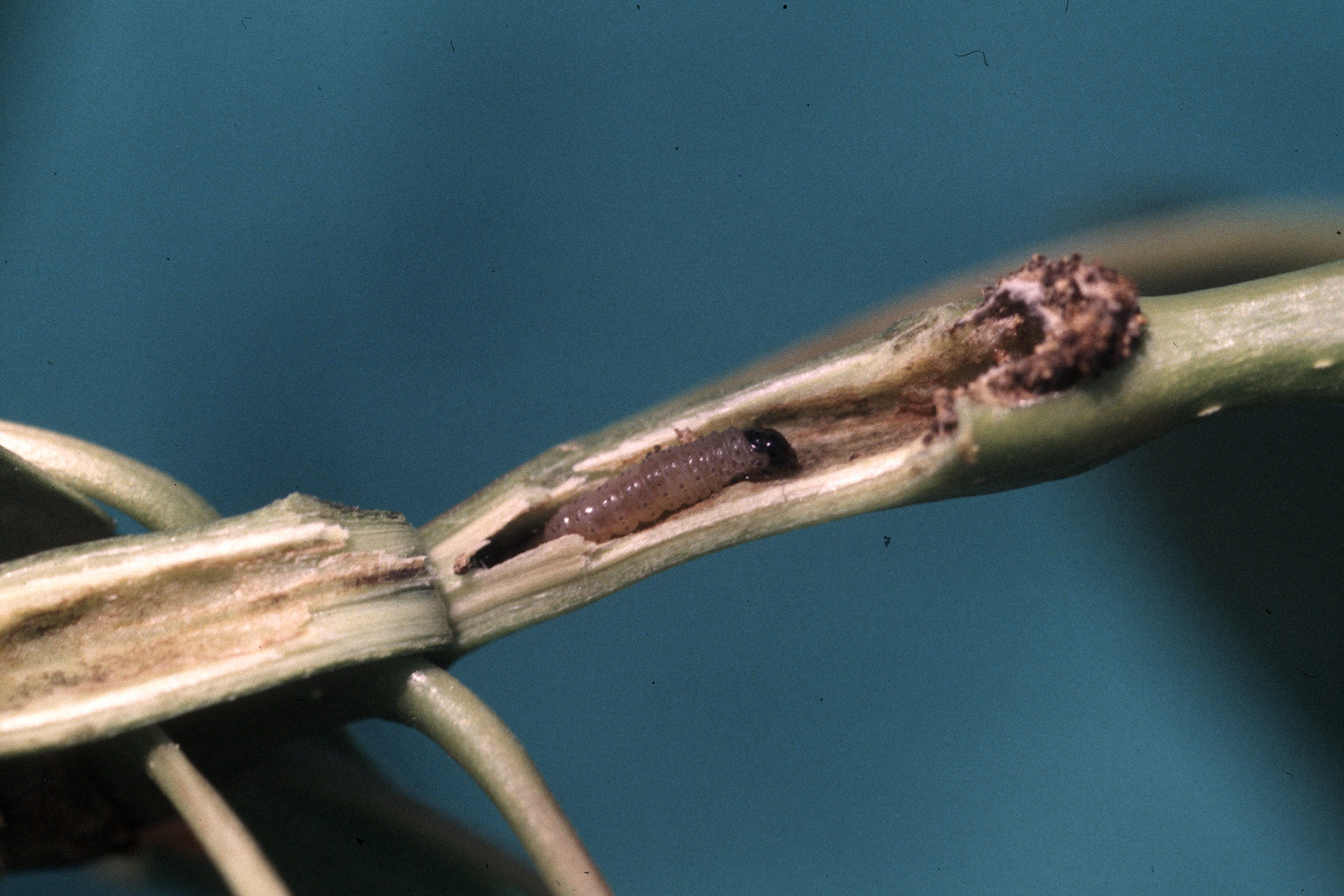
Larva

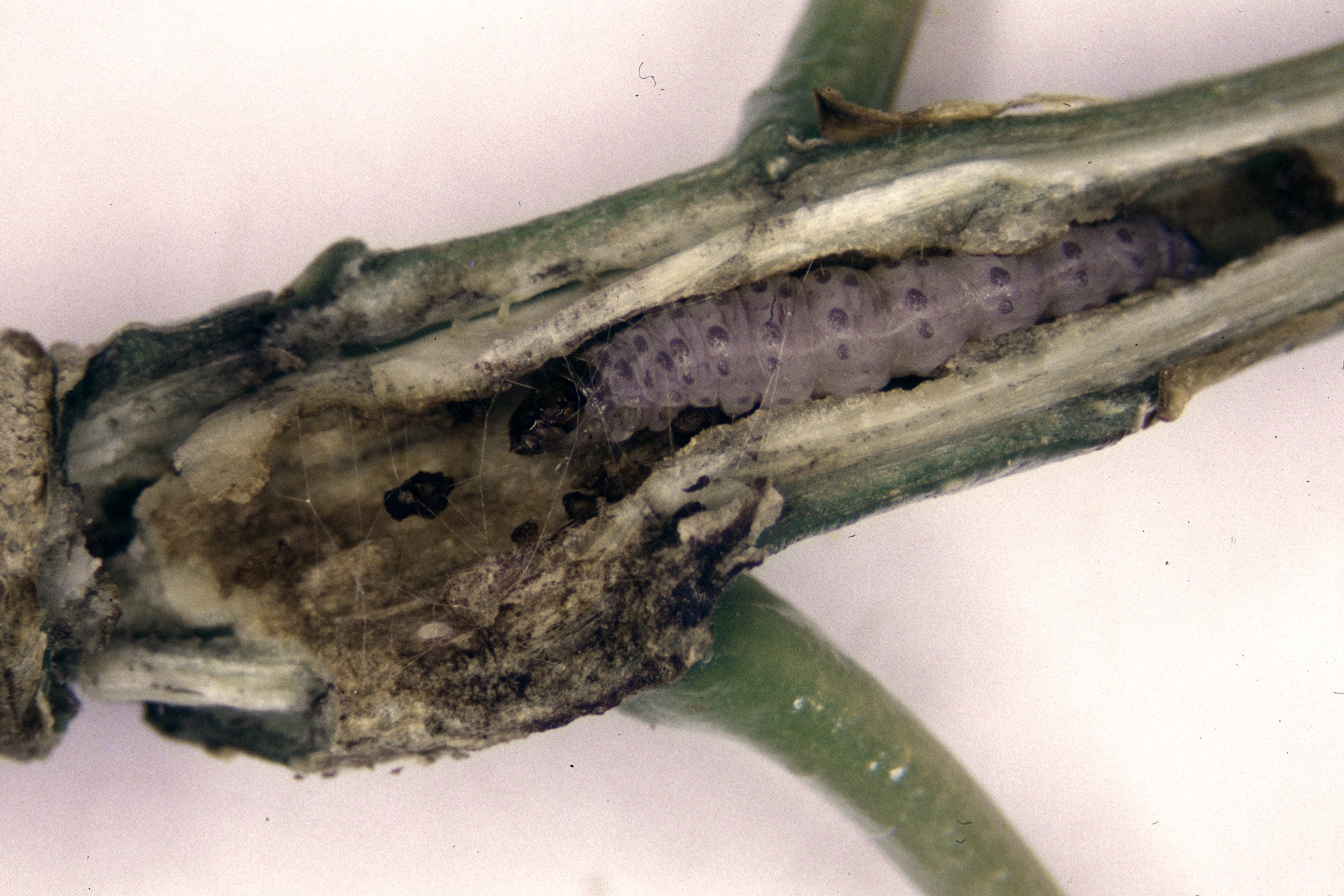
Larva

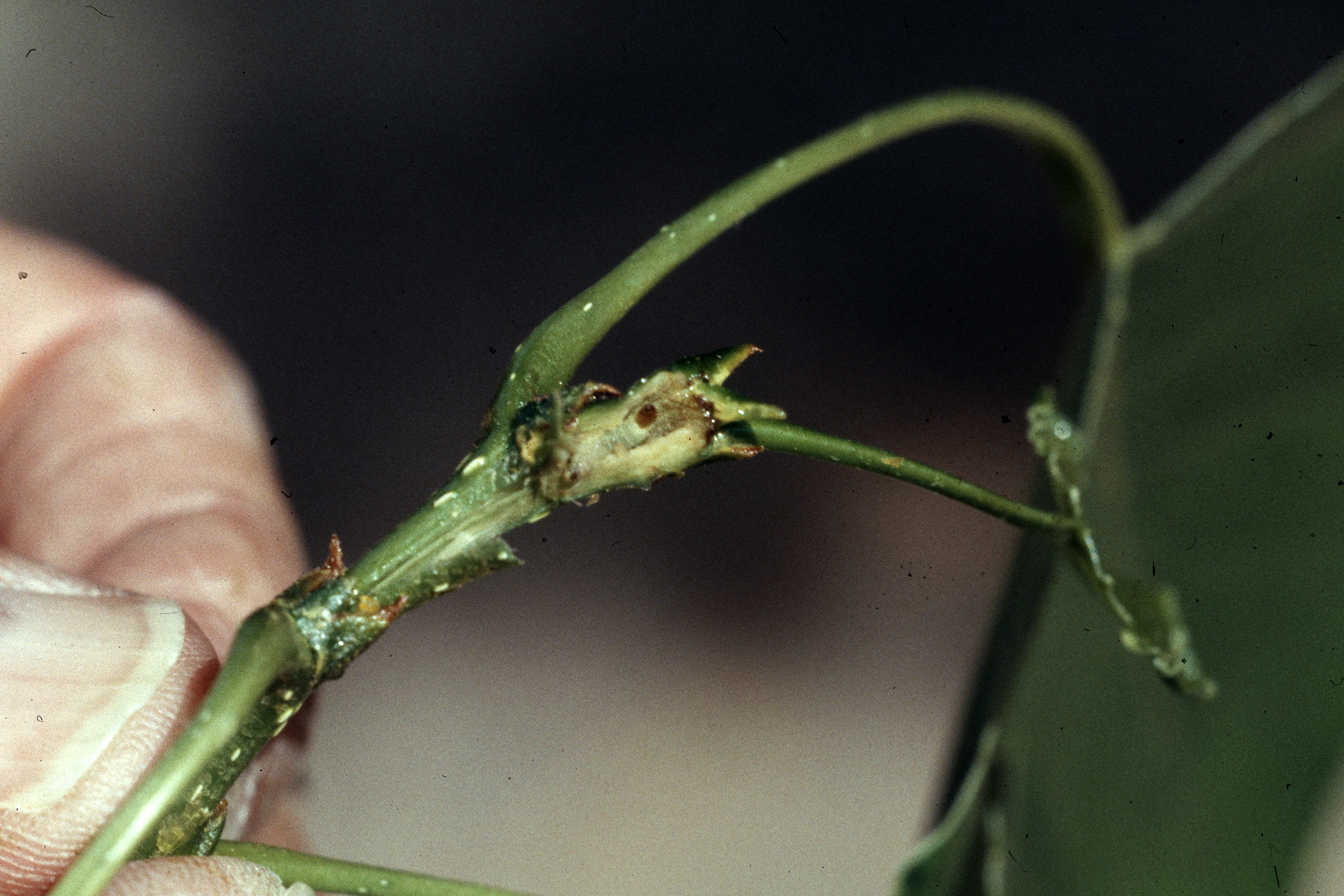
Damage

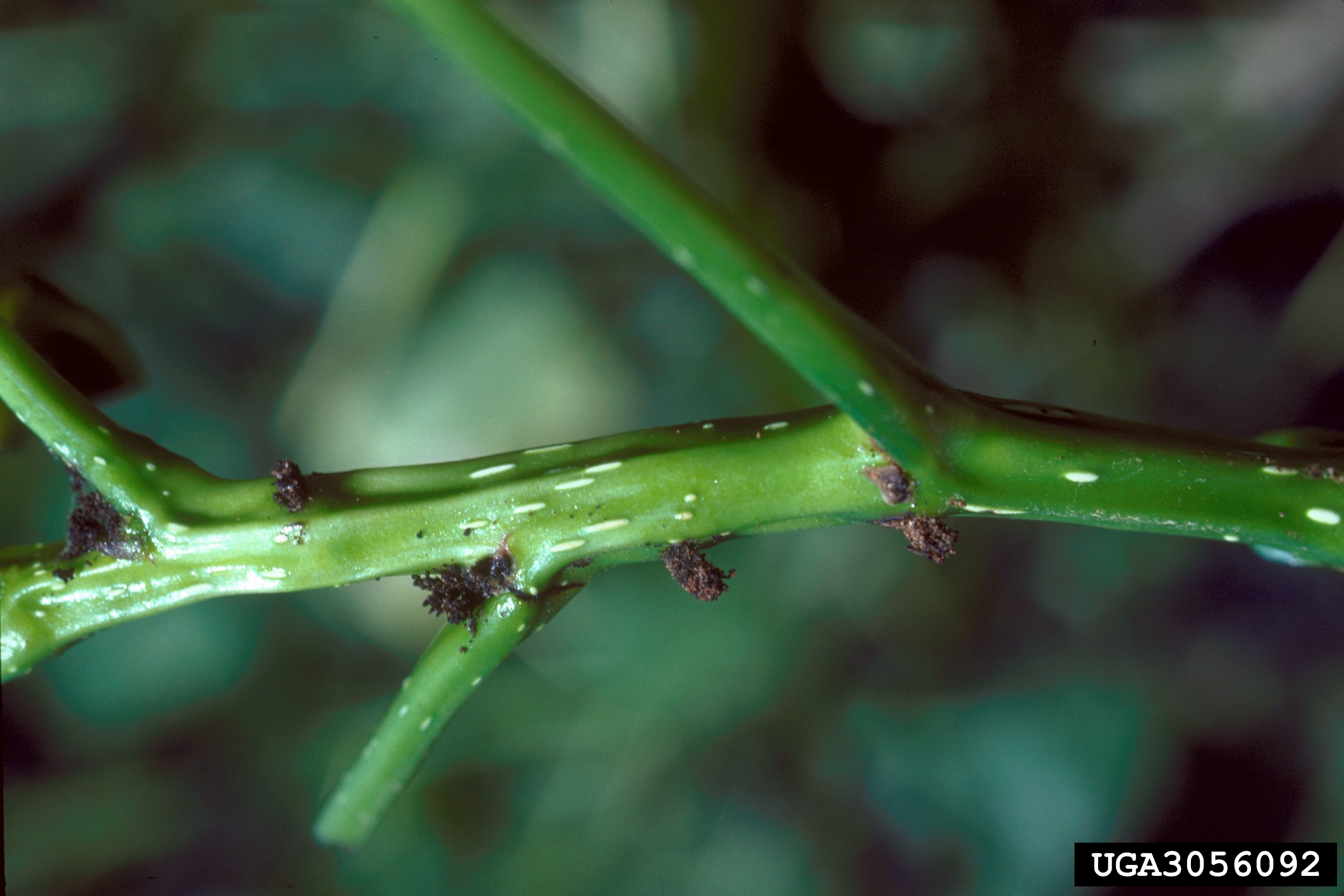
Damage
