= Gypsonoma contorta =

Scientific classification
- Domain: Eukaryota
- Kingdom: Animalia
- Phylum: Arthropoda
- Class: Insecta
- Order: Lepidoptera
- Family: Tortricidae
- Genus: Gypsonoma
- Species: G. contorta

Binomial name
- Gypsonoma contorta Kuznetsov, 1966

Species of moth

Gypsonoma contorta is a species of moth of the family Tortricidae. It is found in China (Shanghai) and the Russian Far East.

The larvae feed on Populus maximowiczii.
