= Sarcogyne brunnea =

Scientific classification
- Kingdom: Fungi
- Division: Ascomycota
- Class: Lecanoromycetes
- Order: Acarosporales
- Family: Acarosporaceae
- Genus: Sarcogyne
- Species: S. brunnea

Binomial name
- Sarcogyne brunnea K.Knudsen & Flakus (2011)

Species of lichen

Sarcogyne brunnea is a species of saxicolous and terricolous (rock- and ground-dwelling), crustose lichen in the family Acarosporaceae. It is found at high altitudes in arid regions of the Andes, growing on volcanic rock and soil. It has an areolate and densely pruinose brown thallus.

== Taxonomy ==
Sarcogyne brunnea was discovered by lichenologists Kerry Knudsen and Adam Flakus, who also formally described this species in 2011. The type specimen of Sarcogyne brunnea was found in a high-altitude semi-desert area of Bolivia. A paratype was later discovered on a steep eroding slope above a brook in Ecuador. The epithet brunnea, which translates to "brown" in Latin, refers to the characteristic brown hue of this lichen's areoles. This character helps distinguish Sarcogyne brunnea from other Sarcogyne species that have a white, non-corticated thallus.

== Description ==
Sarcogyne brunnea is identifiable by its contiguous angular areoles that are up to 1.5 mm in diameter and separated by deep fissures. The thallus is brown and becomes more pronounced when wetted. This lichen has a heavily pruinose surface, with the uppermost layer bearing a dark reddish-brown to lighter brown colour. The algal layer of Sarcogyne brunnea is interrupted by hyphal bundles, making it distinct from the S. crustacea. The lichen's apothecia have a black disc that is epruinose and rough, with a narrow dark brown margin raised above the disc.

Sarcogyne brunnea does not produce any detectable substances according to thin-layer chromatography. Its conidiomata, a form of asexual reproduction, produce hyaline (translucent) conidia that measure 3–4 by 2–3 μm.

== Similar species ==
Sarcogyne brunnea is often compared with Sarcogyne crustacea due to their similar endolithic thalli. The distinguishing factors between these two species lie in their thallus characteristics, conidia size, and ascospore dimensions. Unlike S. crustacea, the thallus of S. brunnea is areolate, brown when wetted, and its algal layer is disrupted by hyphal bundles. Moreover, the conidia and ascospores of S. brunnea are slightly wider than those of S. crustacea. Sarcogyne squamosa, found in Oregon, USA, also has a brown corticate thallus. It differs from S. brunnea in having a thallus comprising small patches of overlapping squamules, shorter conidia (2–3 vs. 4–5 μm), no branching of its paraphyses, and an algal layer that is not interrupted by distinct hyphal bundles.

== Habitat and distribution ==
Sarcogyne brunnea thrives in high-altitude, arid areas of the Andes. Its known habitats include the type locality in Bolivia at an elevation exceeding 4,000 m (13,000 ft) and a slope of the Cotopaxi volcano in Ecuador at 3,800 m (12,500 ft). The lichen is usually found in sunny, exposed locations, growing on volcanic rock and soil. Despite its limited known distribution, the discoverers of Sarcogyne brunnea do not anticipate this species being rare.

== Ecology ==
The well-developed hypothallus of Sarcogyne brunnea acts like rhizohyphae, helping stabilise eroding soil. This feature suggests that Sarcogyne brunnea could play a role in soil preservation in its native environments. The lichen's occurrence on both soil and rock aligns with other members of its family, contributing to the biodiversity of biological soil crusts.
