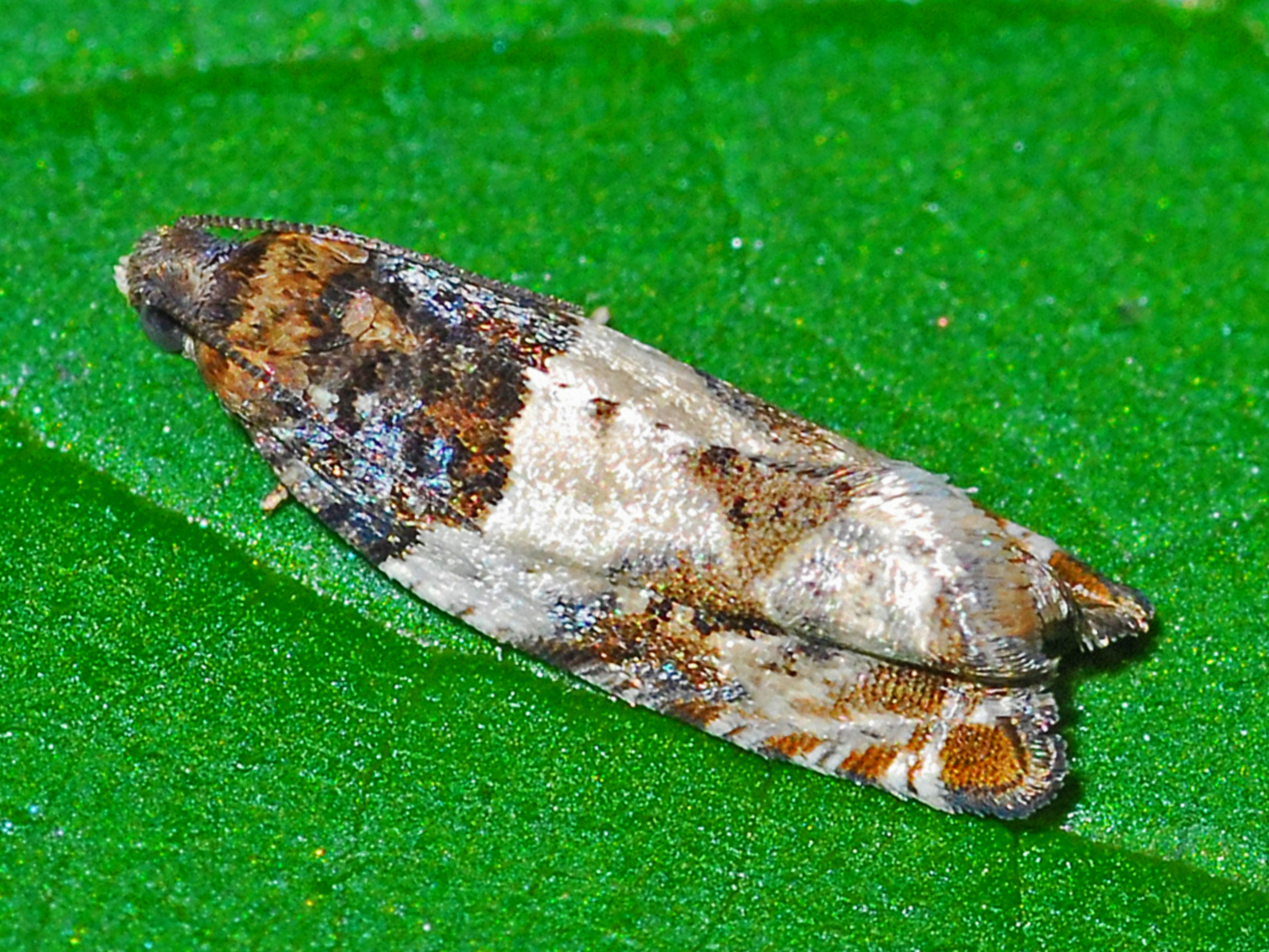

Scientific classification
- Domain: Eukaryota
- Kingdom: Animalia
- Phylum: Arthropoda
- Class: Insecta
- Order: Lepidoptera
- Family: Tortricidae
- Genus: Gypsonoma
- Species: G. dealbana

Binomial name
- Gypsonoma dealbana (Frölich, 1828)

Synonyms
- Tortrix dealbana Frolich, 1828; Spilonota alnetana Guenee, 1845; Penthina minorana Treitschke, 1830; Hedya obscurifasciana Barrett, 1873; Penthina obscurofasciana Heinemann, 1845; Gypsonoma reconditana (Herrich-Schaffer, 1855)

= Gypsonoma dealbana =

Species of moth

Gypsonoma dealbana, the common cloaked shoot, is a moth of the family Tortricidae.

== Description ==
The wingspan is 11–14 mm. These moths have a creamy-white patch on the front of the head.

== Biology ==
Adults are on wing from July to August. The larvae feed on a various deciduous trees, including Salix, Populus, Crataegus, Quercus and Corylus species.

== Distribution ==
This species can be found in most of Europe. It is also found in the Near East and the eastern part of the Palearctic realm. These moths live in well wooded areas.

== Gallery ==
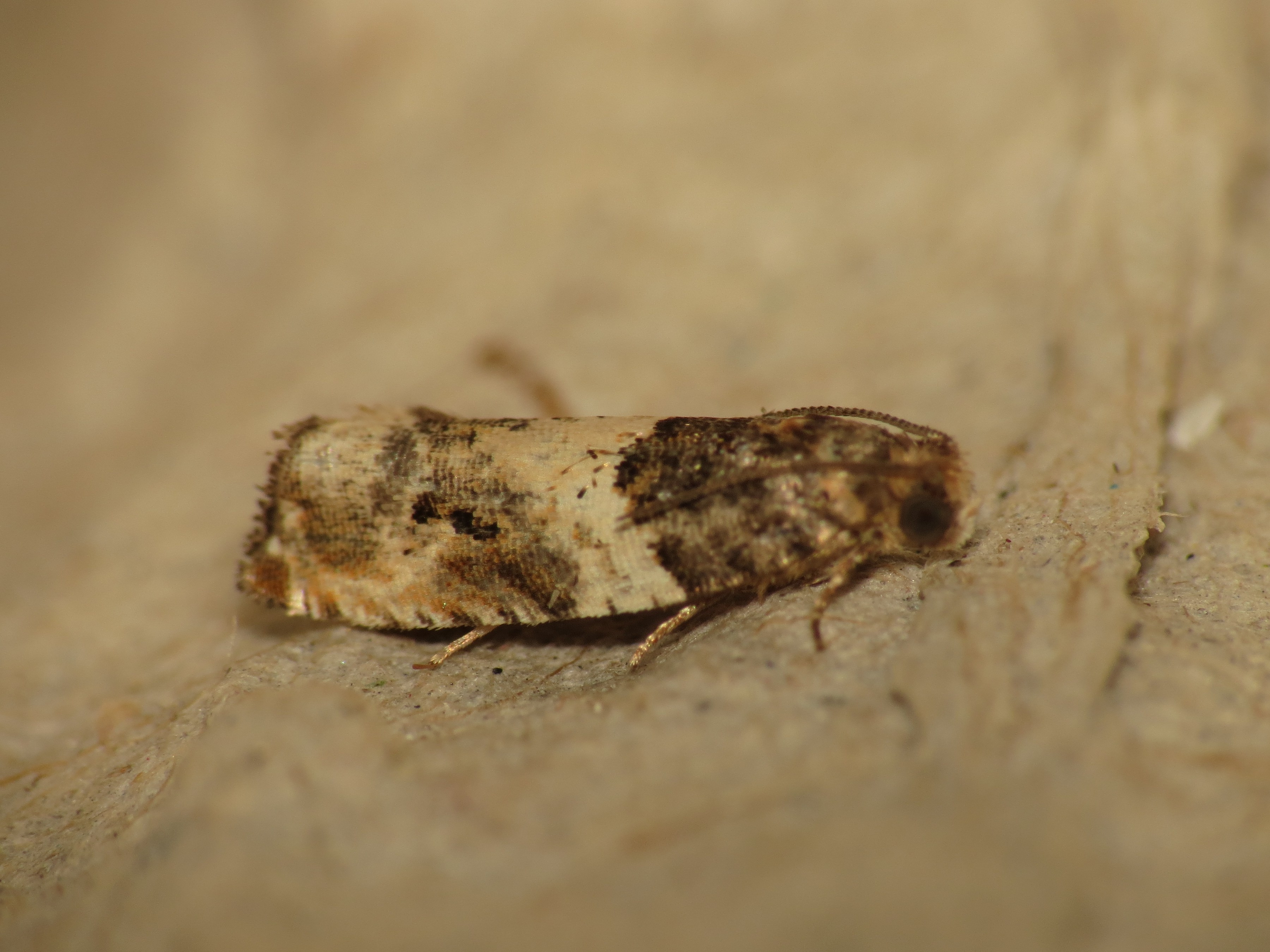

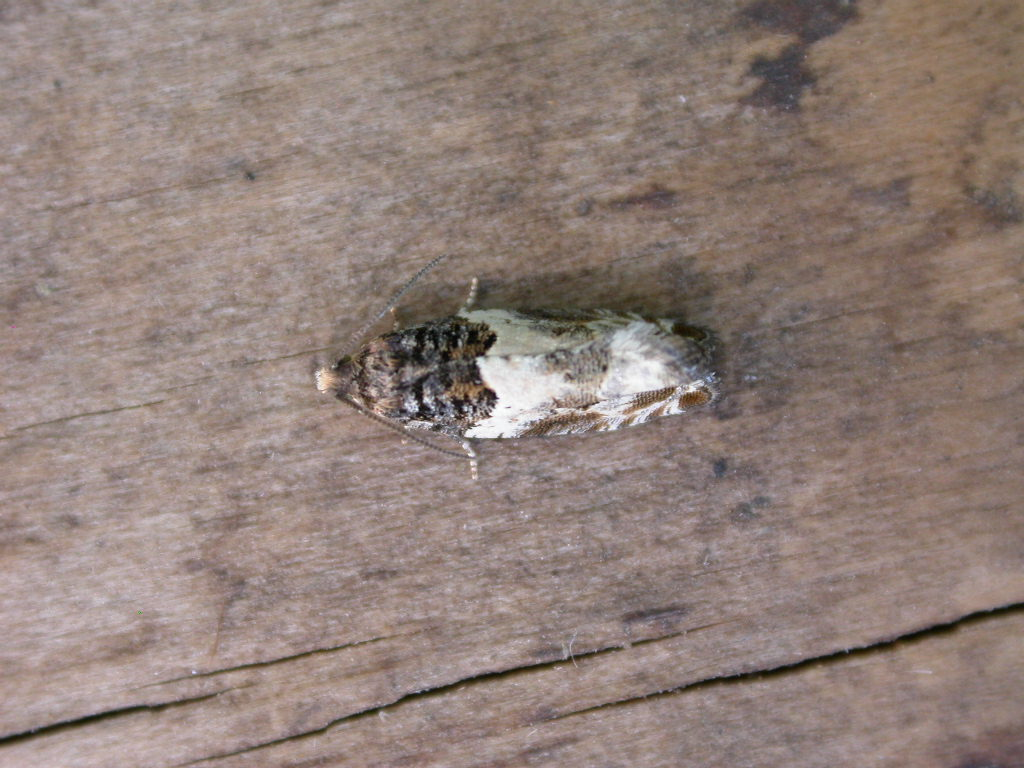

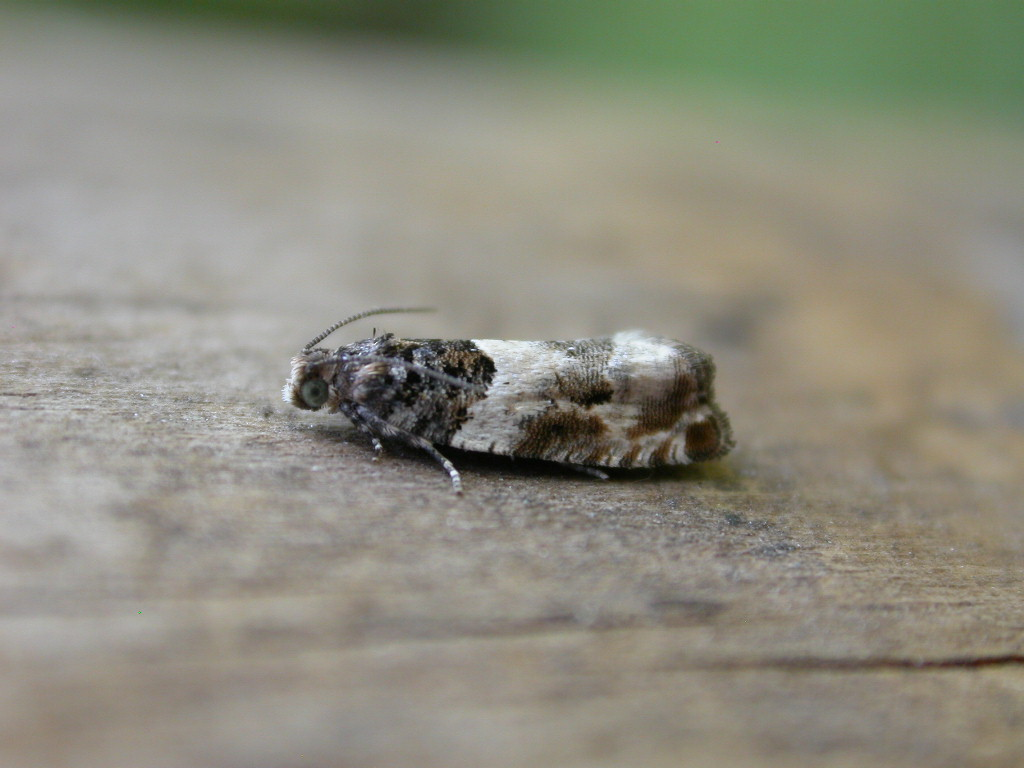
