= Sarcogyne albothallina =

Scientific classification
- Kingdom: Fungi
- Division: Ascomycota
- Class: Lecanoromycetes
- Order: Acarosporales
- Family: Acarosporaceae
- Genus: Sarcogyne
- Species: S. albothallina

Binomial name
- Sarcogyne albothallina K.Knudsen, T.B.Wheeler, Kocourk. & M.Westb. (2016)

Species of lichen-forming fungus

Sarcogyne albothallina is a species of rock-dwelling, crustose lichen-forming fungus in the family Acarosporaceae. It was formally described as a new species in 2016 from specimens collected from the Missouri Breaks region of Montana. It is differentiated from others in Sarcogyne by its white, non-powdery thallus and by the presence of 4-O-methylhiascic acid, a combination of features that separates it from other species sharing a blackened upper spore-bearing surface (carbonized epihymenium).
