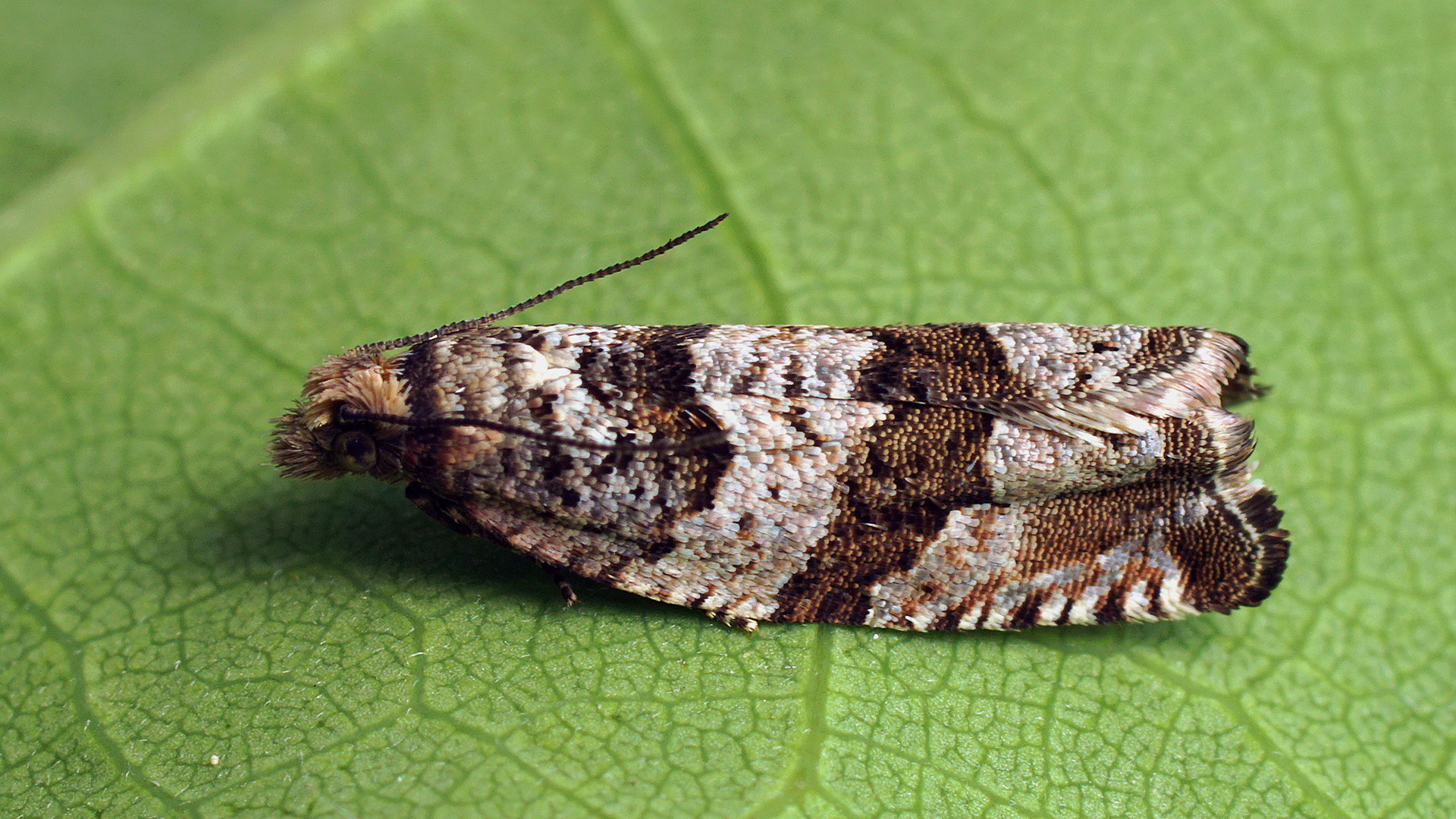
- Gypsonoma nitidulana

Scientific classification
- Domain: Eukaryota
- Kingdom: Animalia
- Phylum: Arthropoda
- Class: Insecta
- Order: Lepidoptera
- Family: Tortricidae
- Tribe: Eucosmini
- Genus: Gypsonoma; Meyrick, 1895

= Gypsonoma =

Genus of tortrix moths

Gypsonoma is a genus of moths belonging to the subfamily Olethreutinae of the family Tortricidae.

== Species ==
- Gypsonoma aceriana (Duponchel, in Godart, 1842)
- Gypsonoma adjuncta Heinrich, 1924
- Gypsonoma aechnemorpha Diakonoff, 1982
- Gypsonoma amseli Razowski, 1967
- Gypsonoma anthracitis Meyrick, 1912
- Gypsonoma attrita Falkovitsh, 1965
- Gypsonoma bifasciata Kuznetzov, 1966
- Gypsonoma buettikeri Razowski, 1995
- Gypsonoma contorta Kuznetzov, 1966
- Gypsonoma dealbana (Frolich, 1828)
- Gypsonoma distincta Kuznetzov, 1971
- Gypsonoma ephoropa (Meyrick, 1931)
- Gypsonoma erubesca Kawabe, 1978
- Gypsonoma euphraticana (Amsel, 1935)
- Gypsonoma fasciolana (Clemens, 1864)
- Gypsonoma gymnesiarum Rebel, 1934
- Gypsonoma haimbachiana (Kearfott, 1907)
- Gypsonoma hiranoi Kawabe, 1980
- Gypsonoma holocrypta (Meyrick, 1931)
- Gypsonoma infuscana Kuznetzov, 1988
- Gypsonoma kawabei Nasu & Kusunoli, 1998
- Gypsonoma maritima Kuznetzov, 1970
- Gypsonoma mica Kuznetzov, 1966
- Gypsonoma minutana (Hubner, [1796-1799])
- Gypsonoma monotonica Kuznetzov, in Kuznetzov & Mikkola, 1991
- Gypsonoma mutabilana Kuznetzov, 1985
- Gypsonoma nebulosana Packard, 1866
- Gypsonoma nitidulana (Lienig & Zeller, 1846)
- Gypsonoma obraztsovi Amsel, 1959
- Gypsonoma ochrotona Razowski, 1963
- Gypsonoma oppressana (Treitschke, 1835)
- Gypsonoma opsonoma (Meyrick, 1918)
- Gypsonoma parryana (Curtis, in Ross, 1835)
- Gypsonoma penthetria Diakonoff, 1992
- Gypsonoma phaeocremna (Meyrick in Caradja & Meyrick, 1937)
- Gypsonoma riparia Meyrick, 1933
- Gypsonoma rivulana Oku, 2005
- Gypsonoma rubescens Kuznetzov, 1971
- Gypsonoma salicicolana (Clemens, 1864)
- Gypsonoma simulantana (Staudinger, 1880)
- Gypsonoma sociana (Haworth, [1811])
- Gypsonoma solidata (Meyrick, 1912)
- Gypsonoma substitutionis Heinrich, 1923

== See also ==
- List of Tortricidae genera
