= Gypsonoma attrita =

Scientific classification
- Domain: Eukaryota
- Kingdom: Animalia
- Phylum: Arthropoda
- Class: Insecta
- Order: Lepidoptera
- Family: Tortricidae
- Genus: Gypsonoma
- Species: G. attrita

Binomial name
- Gypsonoma attrita Falkovitsh, 1965

Species of moth

Gypsonoma attrita is a species of moth of the family Tortricidae. It is found in Taiwan, Japan and the Russian Far East.
