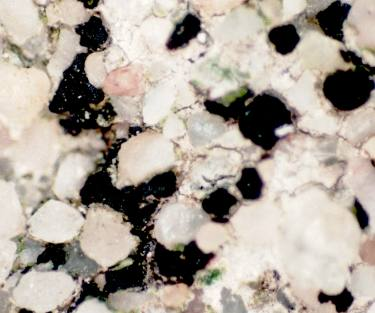
- Sarcogyne regularis (parasitized)

Scientific classification
- Kingdom: Fungi
- Division: Ascomycota
- Class: Lecanoromycetes
- Order: Acarosporales
- Family: Acarosporaceae
- Genus: Sarcogyne; Flot. (1850)

Type species
- Sarcogyne clavus, typ. cons. prop. (DC.) Kremp. (1861)

Synonyms
- Cathisinia Stirt. (1888); Myriosperma Nägeli (1853); Stereopeltis Franzoni & De Not. (1861)

= Sarcogyne =

Genus of lichen-forming fungi

Sarcogyne is a genus of crustose lichen-forming fungi in the family Acarosporaceae. It was circumscribed by German botanist Julius von Flotow in 1850. A proposal has been put forth in 2021 to assign Sarcogyne clavus as the type species of the genus, "as it represents the original concept of Sarcogyne as having melanized lecideine apothecia without algae in the margin".

== Description ==
Genus Sarcogyne includes lichens with a crust-like (crustose) thallus that can be cracked into small, island-like sections called areoles, which are either broadly attached or have a thick fungal base. Sometimes, the thallus is squamulose, meaning it has small, scale-like structures with a stalk less than half the width of the scale.

The upper surface, or epicortex, of these lichens can vary from absent to quite thick and often gives the lichen a shiny appearance, especially in species found in dry or hot habitats. This shiny layer is particularly common in xerothermic or arid environments. The cortex, which forms the outer layer of the thallus, consists of fungal threads (hyphae) and/or round or irregular cells. The upper part of the cortex is pigmented, while the lower part is colourless and sometimes contains crystal formations visible under polarized light. These crystals can come from the lichen's own secondary metabolites or from the substrate it grows on, especially if it is limestone.

The upper surface of Sarcogyne lichens is typically smooth or slightly wrinkled, and usually ranges in colour from pale to reddish-brown to black-brown, and occasionally rust-coloured. Some species may have a powdery coating (pruinose). Cracks often form in the thallus, leading to the lichen's replication through division. The photosynthetic partner (photobiont) in these lichens is of the chlorococcoid type, forming a continuous or occasionally interrupted algal layer under the surface.

The lower cortex can be either present or absent. The fruiting bodies (ascomata) of Sarcogyne are typically apothecia, which are disk-shaped structures that can be immersed in the thallus or elevated. These can appear lecanorine (with a margin that looks like the thallus) or lecideine (with a distinct margin). The disk is usually red-brown to black-brown, smooth or wrinkled, sometimes with a powdery coating or pigment build-ups.

Inside the apothecia, the hamathecium consists of numerous thin to stout, often branched filaments (paraphyses). The asci, which produce spores, typically contain over 100 spores and are club-shaped. The spores are usually spherical to ellipsoidal, colourless, and generally small, not exceeding 6 μm in length, except for Sarcogyne macrocarpa.

Sarcogyne lichens also produce conidiomata (pycnidia), which are small, immersed structures that produce asexual spores. The conidia are small and ellipsoidal to roughly spherical in shape. Chemically, Sarcogyne species often do not produce lichen products detectable by thin-layer chromatography, but may rarely contain gyrophoric or norstictic acid, which can usually be detected with spot tests.

== Species ==
As of February 2026, Species Fungorum accepts 53 species of Sarcogyne.

- Sarcogyne adscendens K.Knudsen, Kocourk. & Hodková (2023)
- Sarcogyne albothallina K.Knudsen, T.B.Wheeler, Kocourk. & M.Westb. (2016)
- Sarcogyne alcesensis K.Knudsen, J.N.Adams, Kocourk. & Y.Wang (2020)
- Sarcogyne alpina K.Knudsen & Kocourk. (2025)
- Sarcogyne arenosa (Herre) K.Knudsen & S.Standl. (2005)
- Sarcogyne basialba K.Knudsen, S.D.Leav., Kocourk. & Kondrysová (2025)
- Sarcogyne belarusensis K.Knudsen, Tsurykau, Kocourk. & Hodková (2023)
- Sarcogyne bernardinensis K.Knudsen, J.N.Adams, Kocourk. & Y.Wang (2020)
- Sarcogyne brouardiana K.Knudsen, Kocourk. & Hodková (2023)
- Sarcogyne brunnea K.Knudsen & Flakus (2011) – Australia
- Sarcogyne calcitrapa Cl.Roux & Poumarat (2023)
- Sarcogyne canadensis (H.Magn.) K.Knudsen, J.N.Adams, Kocourk. & Y.Wang (2020)
- Sarcogyne canberrensis P.M.McCarthy & Elix (2017)
- Sarcogyne clavus (DC.) Kremp. (1861)
- Sarcogyne coeruleonigricans K.Knudsen, Kocourk. & Hodková (2023)
- Sarcogyne convexa K.Knudsen, J.N.Adams, Kocourk. & Y.Wang (2020)
- Sarcogyne crispula Afshan, Fayyaz & K.Knudsen (2023)
- Sarcogyne crustacea K.Knudsen & Kocourk. (2010)
- Sarcogyne desolata (H.Magn.) K.Knudsen & S.Standl. (2007)
- Sarcogyne diffusa K.Knudsen, Hollinger, Kondrysová & Kocourk. (2025)
- Sarcogyne distans (Arnold) K.Knudsen & Kocourk. (2024)
- Sarcogyne endopetrophila Tokizawa & Y.Ohmura (2014)
- Sarcogyne fasciculata K.Knudsen, Kocourk. & Hodková (2025)
- Sarcogyne humicola P.M.McCarthy & Elix (2021)
- Sarcogyne hypophaea (Nyl.) Arnold (1871)
- Sarcogyne iridana P.M.McCarthy & Kantvilas (2013) – Australia
- Sarcogyne jejuensis J.S.Park & S.O.Oh (2023)
- Sarcogyne joshuaensis K.Knudsen & Kocourk. (2025)
- Sarcogyne lapponica (Ach. ex Schaer.) K.Knudsen & Kocourk. (2008)
- Sarcogyne lecanorina K.Knudsen, Kocourk. & Hodková (2023)
- Sarcogyne lobata Cl.Roux & Poumarat (2023)
- Sarcogyne magnispora K.Knudsen & Halıcı (2009) – Turkey
- Sarcogyne malpaiensis K.Knudsen, Kocourk. & Hodková (2023)
- Sarcogyne maritima P.M.McCarthy & Elix (2017) – Australia
- Sarcogyne meridionalis P.M.McCarthy & Kantvilas (2013) – Australia
- Sarcogyne mitziae K.Knudsen, Kocourk. & McCune (2013)
- Sarcogyne molongloensis P.M.McCarthy & Elix (2020) – Australia
- Sarcogyne nimisii K.Knudsen, Kocourk. & Hodková (2023)
- Sarcogyne nogalensis K.Knudsen, Kocourk. & Hodková (2023)
- Sarcogyne oceanica K.Knudsen & Kocourk. (2021)
- Sarcogyne pakistanensis R.Zulfiqar, Khalid & K.Knudsen (2023)
- Sarcogyne paradoxa Kocourk. & K.Knudsen (2020)
- Sarcogyne parviascifera Jiao H.Wang & J.C.Wei (2016)
- Sarcogyne poeltii K.Knudsen, Obermayer, Hodková & Kocourk. (2023)
- Sarcogyne porphyricola P.M.McCarthy & Elix (2020) – Australia
- Sarcogyne praetermissa K.Knudsen & Kocourk. (2018) – Europe
- Sarcogyne pruinosa (Schaer.) A.Massal. (1854)
- Sarcogyne reebiae K.Knudsen & S.Standl. (2007)
- Sarcogyne regalis P.M.McCarthy & Elix (2021)
- Sarcogyne regularis Körb. (1855)
- Sarcogyne saphyniana L.Nurtai, K.Knudsen & A.Abbas (2016) – China
- Sarcogyne sekikaica P.M.McCarthy & Elix (2014) – Australia
- Sarcogyne similis H.Magn. (1934)
- Sarcogyne squamosa K.Knudsen & McCune (2013)
- Sarcogyne terrulenta P.M.McCarthy & Elix (2020) – Australia
- Sarcogyne tholifera P.M.McCarthy & Elix (2017) – Australia
- Sarcogyne ulleungdoensis S.Y.Kondr., Lőkös & Hur (2018)
- Sarcogyne wheeleri K.Knudsen, J.N.Adams, Kocourk. & Y.Wang (2020)

== Gallery ==
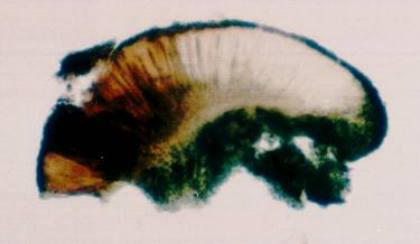
Sarcogyne regularis (section of apothecium; reddish part parasitized, hyaline normal)
