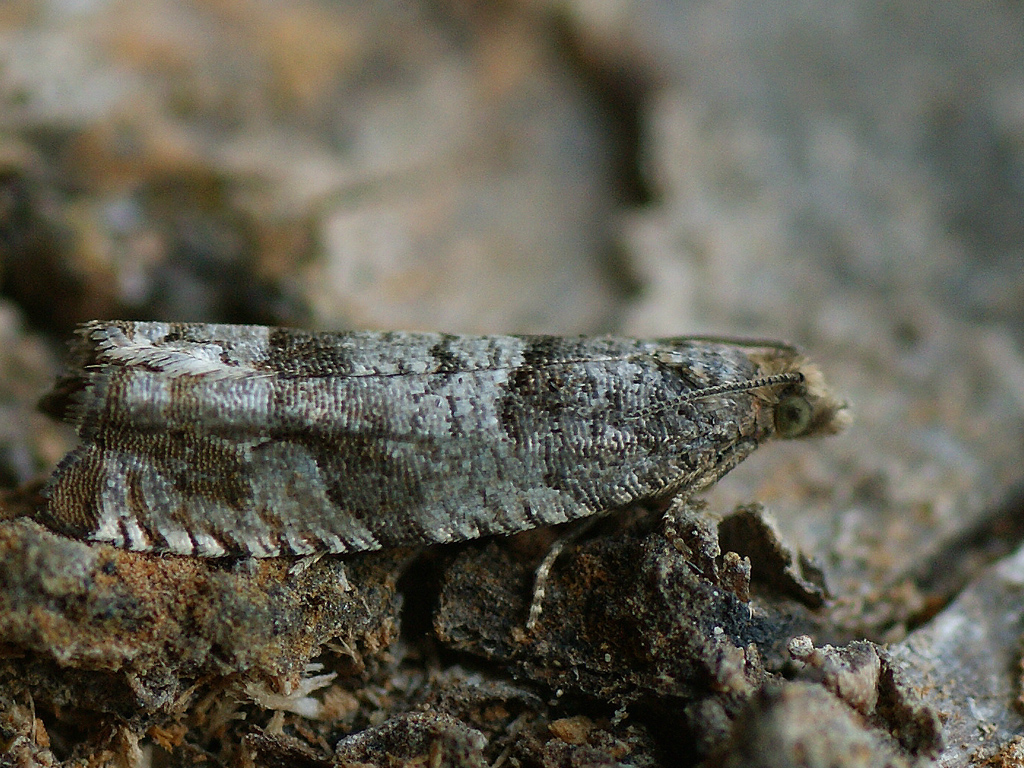

Scientific classification
- Kingdom: Animalia
- Phylum: Arthropoda
- Clade: Pancrustacea
- Class: Insecta
- Order: Lepidoptera
- Family: Tortricidae
- Genus: Gypsonoma
- Species: G. nitidulana

Binomial name
- Gypsonoma nitidulana (Lienig & Zeller, 1846)

= Gypsonoma nitidulana =

Species of moth

Gypsonoma nitidulana is a species of moth belonging to the family Tortricidae that was first described by Friederike Lienig and Philipp Christoph Zeller in 1846. It is native to Eurasia.
