= Sarcogyne maritima =

Scientific classification
- Kingdom: Fungi
- Division: Ascomycota
- Class: Lecanoromycetes
- Order: Acarosporales
- Family: Acarosporaceae
- Genus: Sarcogyne
- Species: S. maritima

Binomial name
- Sarcogyne maritima P.M.McCarthy & Elix (2017)

Species of lichen

Sarcogyne maritima is a species of crustose lichen in the family Acarosporaceae. Found in Australia, it was described as a new species in 2017 by lichenologists John Elix and Patrick McCarthy. The type specimen was collected on Werri Beach (on the South Coast of New South Wales), where it was found growing above the seashore on hard sandstone. It is only known to occur at this location. The specific epithet maritima alludes to its habitat on coastal rocks.
