= Gypsonoma aechnemorpha =

Scientific classification
- Domain: Eukaryota
- Kingdom: Animalia
- Phylum: Arthropoda
- Class: Insecta
- Order: Lepidoptera
- Family: Tortricidae
- Genus: Gypsonoma
- Species: G. aechnemorpha

Binomial name
- Gypsonoma aechnemorpha Diakonoff, 1982

Species of moth

Gypsonoma aechnemorpha is a moth of the family Tortricidae first described by Alexey Diakonoff in 1982. It is found in Sri Lanka.

== Description ==
Adult male wingspan is 9.5 mm. Head light fuscous. Vertex and forehead whitish. short palpi slender with short scales. Antenna pale ochreous. Thorax pale cinereous (ash grey). Abdomen pale ashy grey, with black marbles. Forewings oblong oval, broad middle which gradually narrowed towards apex. Costa curved with obtusely pointed apex. Forewings pale cinereous, marked with fuscous black. Anterior half of costa consists with 7 or 8 small black transverse marks. A larger black mark found at one fourth of costa. Cilia cinereous, darker around apex. Hindwings narrow and pointed, colour greyish fuscous. Cilia light fuscous with a white basal band.
