= Gypsonoma mutabilana =

Scientific classification
- Domain: Eukaryota
- Kingdom: Animalia
- Phylum: Arthropoda
- Class: Insecta
- Order: Lepidoptera
- Family: Tortricidae
- Genus: Gypsonoma
- Species: G. mutabilana

Binomial name
- Gypsonoma mutabilana Kuznetsov, 1985

Species of moth

Gypsonoma mutabilana is a species of moth of the family Tortricidae. It is found in China (Tibet) and Russia.
