= Gypsonoma obraztsovi =

Scientific classification
- Domain: Eukaryota
- Kingdom: Animalia
- Phylum: Arthropoda
- Class: Insecta
- Order: Lepidoptera
- Family: Tortricidae
- Genus: Gypsonoma
- Species: G. obraztsovi

Binomial name
- Gypsonoma obraztsovi Amsel, 1959

Species of moth

Gypsonoma obraztsovi is a species of moth of the family Tortricidae. It is found in Iran, Syria, Hungary and Romania.

The wingspan is 10–13 mm. Adults have been recorded on wing in April and May.

The larvae feed on Salix species.
