= Sarcogyne parviascifera =

Scientific classification
- Kingdom: Fungi
- Division: Ascomycota
- Class: Lecanoromycetes
- Order: Acarosporales
- Family: Acarosporaceae
- Genus: Sarcogyne
- Species: S. parviascifera

Binomial name
- Sarcogyne parviascifera Jiao H.Wang & J.C.Wei (2016)
- Type locality: Zhifanggou, China

Species of lichen-forming fungus

Sarcogyne parviascifera is a species of rock-dwelling, crustose lichen-forming fungus in the family Acarosporaceae. Found in China, it was formally described as a new species in 2016. The lichen is endolithic, growing embedded within rock rather than on its surface, with only its small, black fruiting bodies visible at the surface. It is named for its unusually small asci (spore-bearing structures), which help distinguish it from the otherwise similar Sarcogyne regularis.

== Taxonomy ==
Sarcogyne parviascifera is a saxicolous, lichen-forming fungus in the genus Sarcogyne (Acarosporaceae, Ascomycota). It was described as new to science in 2016 from north-western China, based on a collection made in Shaanxi Province. The authors treated it as distinct on the basis of a combined morphological and DNA-based assessment. In their diagnosis, the authors compared the new species most directly with Sarcogyne regularis, which has similar black, pruinose fruiting bodies (apothecia), but differs in having larger asci and typically more spores per ascus. Internal transcribed spacer sequence data (neighbour-joining analysis) placed it in a different clade (evolutionary line) from S. regularis, supporting its recognition as a separate species. The specific epithet parviascifera refers to the characteristically small asci (from Latin elements meaning "bearing small asci").

== Description ==
The thallus is endolithic, meaning it grows embedded within the rock rather than on its surface. The fruiting bodies (apothecia) are lecideine in form (with a rim formed by fungal tissue rather than thallus tissue) and typically numerous, unstalked (sessile), and circular, measuring about 0.25–0.75 mm wide and 0.25–0.38 mm thick. The disc is black, flat to convex, roughened, and lightly frosted (slightly pruinose). The outer rim (true exciple) is dark brown and about 62.5 μm thick, the uppermost layer of the spore-bearing region (epithecium) is dark brown and 12.5–17.5 μm thick, and the spore-bearing layer (hymenium) beneath is pale brown and 40–75 μm tall.

The paraphyses (sterile filaments between the asci) are unbranched, about 1.3–2.5 μm wide, with swollen tips; they are glued together but separate when treated with potassium hydroxide (K). The tissue beneath the spore-bearing layer (hypothecium) is pale brown (about 10–15 μm thick), and the layer below that (subhypothecium) is brown (about 10–15 μm thick). The asci are club-shaped (clavate) and comparatively small for the genus, 40–50(–62.5) × 5–10(–15) μm, and typically contain 90–100 spores each. The ascospores are colourless (hyaline), usually broadly ellipsoid (sometimes appearing spherical), 3–5 × 2–3 μm, and stain blue with iodine (I+ blue) and blue-red with iodine–potassium iodide (IKI+ blue-red).

== Habitat and distribution ==
The species is known from its type collection in China, Shaanxi Province, Ansai District (Zhifanggou), where it was found growing on rock. As an endolithic lichen, it grows largely within the rock, with the apothecia forming at the surface.
