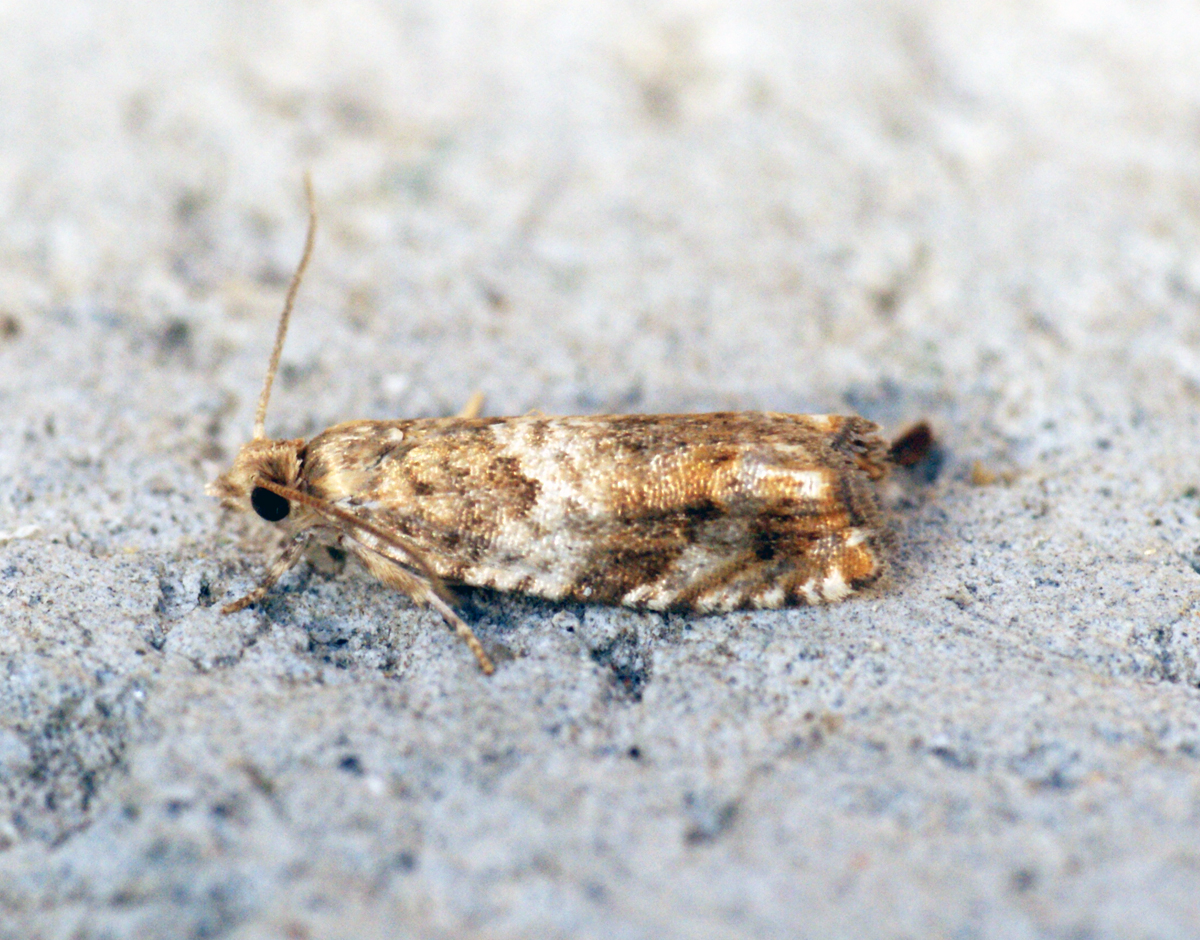

Scientific classification
- Kingdom: Animalia
- Phylum: Arthropoda
- Class: Insecta
- Order: Lepidoptera
- Family: Tortricidae
- Genus: Gypsonoma
- Species: G. oppressana

Binomial name
- Gypsonoma oppressana (Treitschke, 1835)

Synonyms
- Paedisca oppressana Treitschke, 1835; Phaneta cnephasiana Obraztsov, 1943; Gypsonoma opressana Razowski, 1987

= Gypsonoma oppressana =

Species of moth

Gypsonoma oppressana, commonly known as the poplar bud-worm, is a moth belonging to the Tortricidae family. It is found on Madeira and in central and southern Europe, from Transcaucasia to Kazakhstan and Tajikistan.

The wingspan is 12–15 mm. Adults are on wing in June and July.

The larvae feed on Populus nigra, Populus alba, and Populus tremula.
