= Gypsonoma bifasciata =

Scientific classification
- Domain: Eukaryota
- Kingdom: Animalia
- Phylum: Arthropoda
- Class: Insecta
- Order: Lepidoptera
- Family: Tortricidae
- Genus: Gypsonoma
- Species: G. bifasciata

Binomial name
- Gypsonoma bifasciata Kuznetsov, 1966

Species of moth

Gypsonoma bifasciata is a species of moth of the family Tortricidae. It is found in China, Korea, Japan and Russia.

The wingspan is 9–13 mm.

The larvae feed on Salix species.
