= Gypsonoma distincta =

Scientific classification
- Domain: Eukaryota
- Kingdom: Animalia
- Phylum: Arthropoda
- Class: Insecta
- Order: Lepidoptera
- Family: Tortricidae
- Genus: Gypsonoma
- Species: G. distincta

Binomial name
- Gypsonoma distincta Kuznetsov, 1971

Species of moth

Gypsonoma distincta is a species of moth of the family Tortricidae. It is found in China (Sichuan, Shaanxi, Gansu).
