= Gypsonoma rubescens =

Scientific classification
- Domain: Eukaryota
- Kingdom: Animalia
- Phylum: Arthropoda
- Class: Insecta
- Order: Lepidoptera
- Family: Tortricidae
- Genus: Gypsonoma
- Species: G. rubescens

Binomial name
- Gypsonoma rubescens Kuznetsov, 1971

Species of moth

Gypsonoma rubescens is a species of moth of the family Tortricidae. It is found in China (Tianjin, Henan, Sichuan, Guizhou, Yunnan, Shaanxi, Qinghai).
