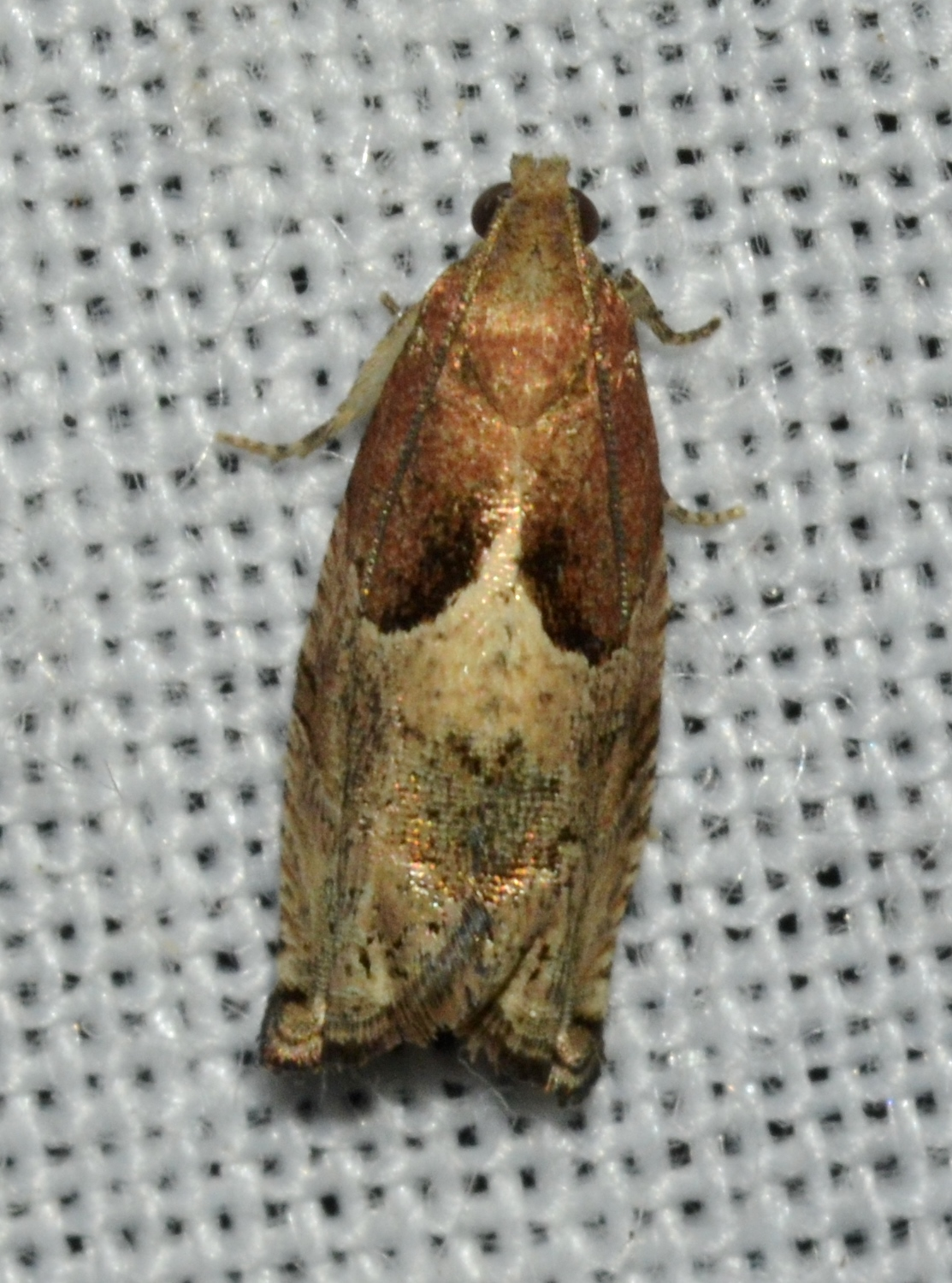

Scientific classification
- Kingdom: Animalia
- Phylum: Arthropoda
- Clade: Pancrustacea
- Class: Insecta
- Order: Lepidoptera
- Family: Tortricidae
- Genus: Gypsonoma
- Species: G. salicicolana

Binomial name
- Gypsonoma salicicolana (Clemens, 1864)

Synonyms
- Hedya salicicolana Clemens, 1864; Hedya saliciana Clemens, 1864

= Gypsonoma salicicolana =

Species of moth

Gypsonoma salicicolana is a species of moth of the family Tortricidae. It is found in North America, where it has been recorded from Quebec to Florida, west through Texas to California and north to Alberta.

The length of the forewings is 4.3–6.2 mm. The main flight period is May to July.

The larvae feed on leaves of Salix species, including Salix cordata, Salix humilis, and Salix interior.
