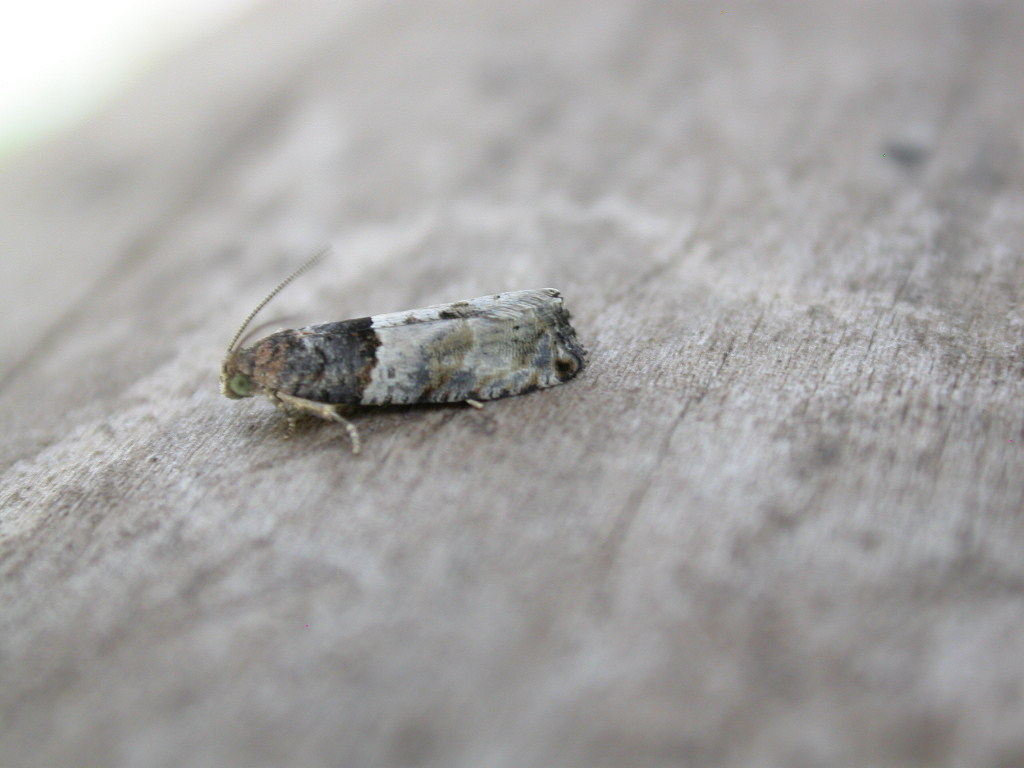

Scientific classification
- Kingdom: Animalia
- Phylum: Arthropoda
- Class: Insecta
- Order: Lepidoptera
- Family: Tortricidae
- Genus: Gypsonoma
- Species: G. aceriana

Binomial name
- Gypsonoma aceriana (Duponchel, 1843)

Synonyms
- Penthina aceriana Duponchel, in Godart, 1842; Gypsonoma aceriana f. belgiensis Dufrane, 1945

= Gypsonoma aceriana =

Species of moth

Gypsonoma aceriana, the poplar shoot-borer, is a moth of the family Tortricidae. It is found from Europe to Russia, eastern Turkey and Iraq. It is also present in North Africa.

The wingspan is 13–15 mm. The face is whitish-fuscous. The forewings are ochreous-whitish, more or less sprinkled and posteriorly suffused with pale brownish< The costa is obscurely strigulated with blackish. The basal patch is fuscous marked with blackish, its edge obtusely or hardly angulated, The central fascia is fuscous, ill-defined, more or less interrupted near dorsum and with small blackish mark in the disc. There are some dots round the ocellus, an irregular spot touching the middle of the termen, and a blackish small apical spot. The hindwings are grey. The larva is dull brownish; head reddish-brown; plate of 2 black

Adults are on wing in July. In Japan, there are two to three generations per year (in June, July and August).

The larvae feed on Populus nigra, Populus nigra subsp. italica, Populus alba, Populus balsamifera, Acer platanoides and Acer campestre. It is a common species in poplar plantations and nurseries. It has been recorded as a pest from Italy, France, Germany and the Netherlands. Older larvae (third instars) bore into buds and below terminal shoots, which are usually destroyed, causing bushy growth of lateral shoots and making young trees unmarketable.
