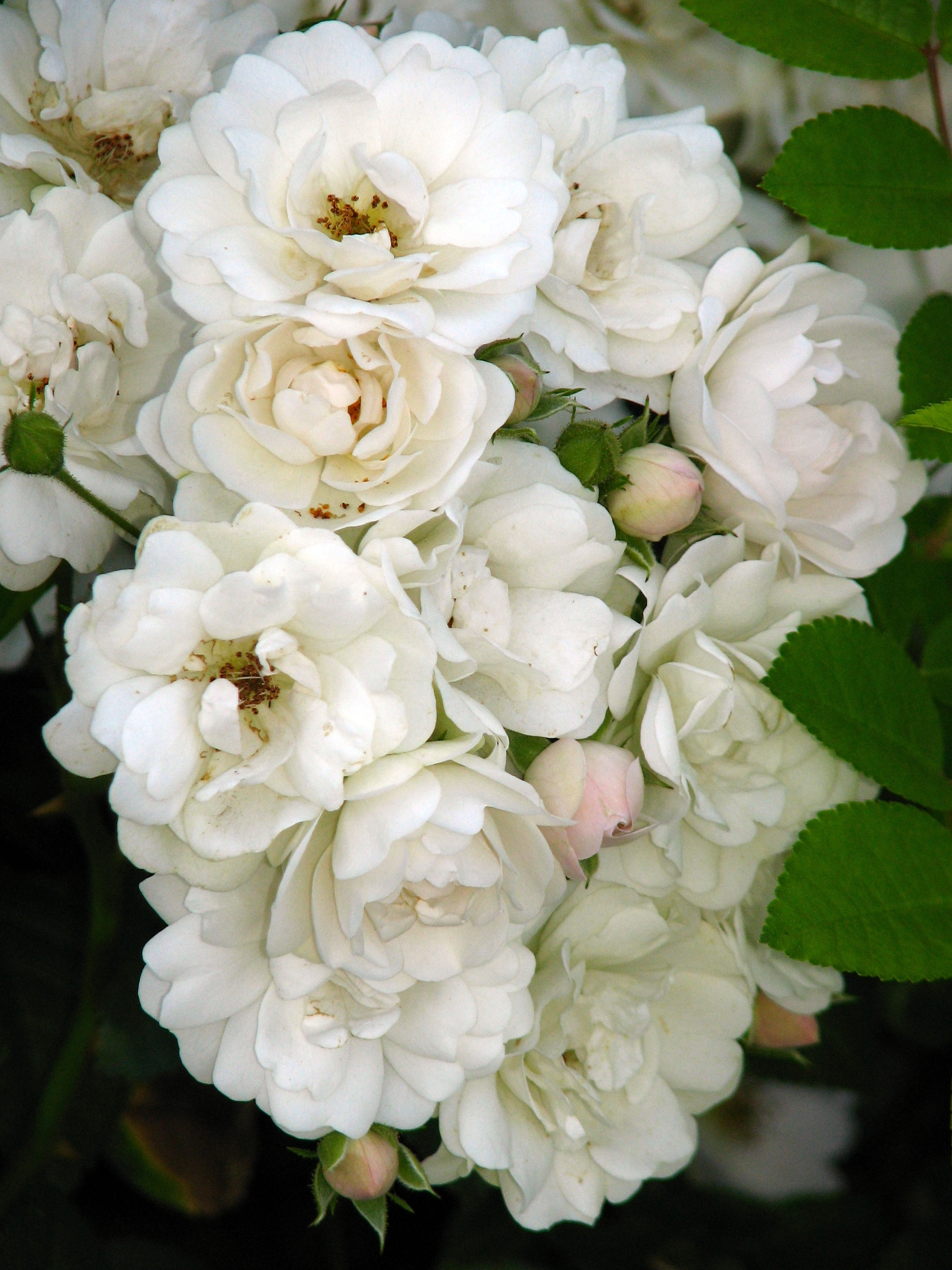
- Rosa 'Polstjärnan' cultivar

Scientific classification
- Kingdom: Plantae
- Clade: Tracheophytes
- Clade: Angiosperms
- Clade: Eudicots
- Clade: Rosids
- Order: Rosales
- Family: Rosaceae
- Genus: Rosa
- Species: R. beggeriana

Binomial name
- Rosa beggeriana Schrenk

Synonyms
- List: Rosa anserinifolia Boiss.; Rosa beggeriana var. anserinifolia (Boiss.) Regel; Rosa cabulica Boiss.; Rosa lacerans Boiss. & Buhse; Rosa latispina Boiss.; Rosa mitis Boiss. & Buhse; Rosa silverhielmii Schrenk

= Rosa beggeriana =

- Rosa beggeriana. Kyrgyzstan.

Species of flowering plant

Rosa beggeriana is a species of rose found in Anatolia, Iran, Afghanistan, Pakistan, all of Central Asia, Xinjiang and Gansu in China, and Mongolia. It is a winter‑hardy rambler, with typically flat white (rarely light pink) flowers, and small red (becoming black‑purple) hips. Its 'Polstjärnan' (polestar) cultivar (of uncertain parentage) is the cold‑hardiest known climbing rose.

== Varieties ==
Rosa beggeriana is a highly variable species, with numerous infraspecific taxa having been described. The following varieties are currently accepted:

- Rosa beggeriana var. beggeriana
- Rosa beggeriana var. lioui (T.T.Yu & H.T.Tsai) T.T.Yu & T.C.Ku
