= Salix abscondita =

Conservation status
- Least Concern (IUCN 3.1)

Scientific classification
- Kingdom: Plantae
- Clade: Embryophytes
- Clade: Tracheophytes
- Clade: Spermatophytes
- Clade: Angiosperms
- Clade: Eudicots
- Clade: Rosids
- Order: Malpighiales
- Family: Salicaceae
- Genus: Salix
- Species: S. abscondita

Binomial name
- Salix abscondita Lacksch.

Synonyms
- List: Salix enanderi Flod.; Salix liangshuiensis Y.L.Chou & C.Y.King; Salix liangshuiensis var. subglabra Y.L.Chang & Skvortsov; Salix oleninii Nasarow; Salix paraplesia f. lanceolata C.Wang & C.Y.Yu; Salix raddeana Laksch. ex Nasarow; Salix raddeana var. liangshuiensis (Y.L.Chou & C.Y.King) Y.L.Chou; Salix sugawarana Koidz. ex Kimura; Salix tatewakii Kimura

Species of flowering plant

Salix abscondita is a species of willow tree native to western Asia.

== Distribution ==
The plant ranges from Siberia to northern China and Korea.
