= Barrow Canyon =

Submarine canyon

Coordinates: 71°30′N 157°30′W

Barrow Canyon is a submarine canyon that straddles the boundary between the Beaufort and Chukchi seas. Compared to other nearby areas and the Canada Basin, the highly productive Barrow Canyon supports a diversity of marine animals and invertebrates.

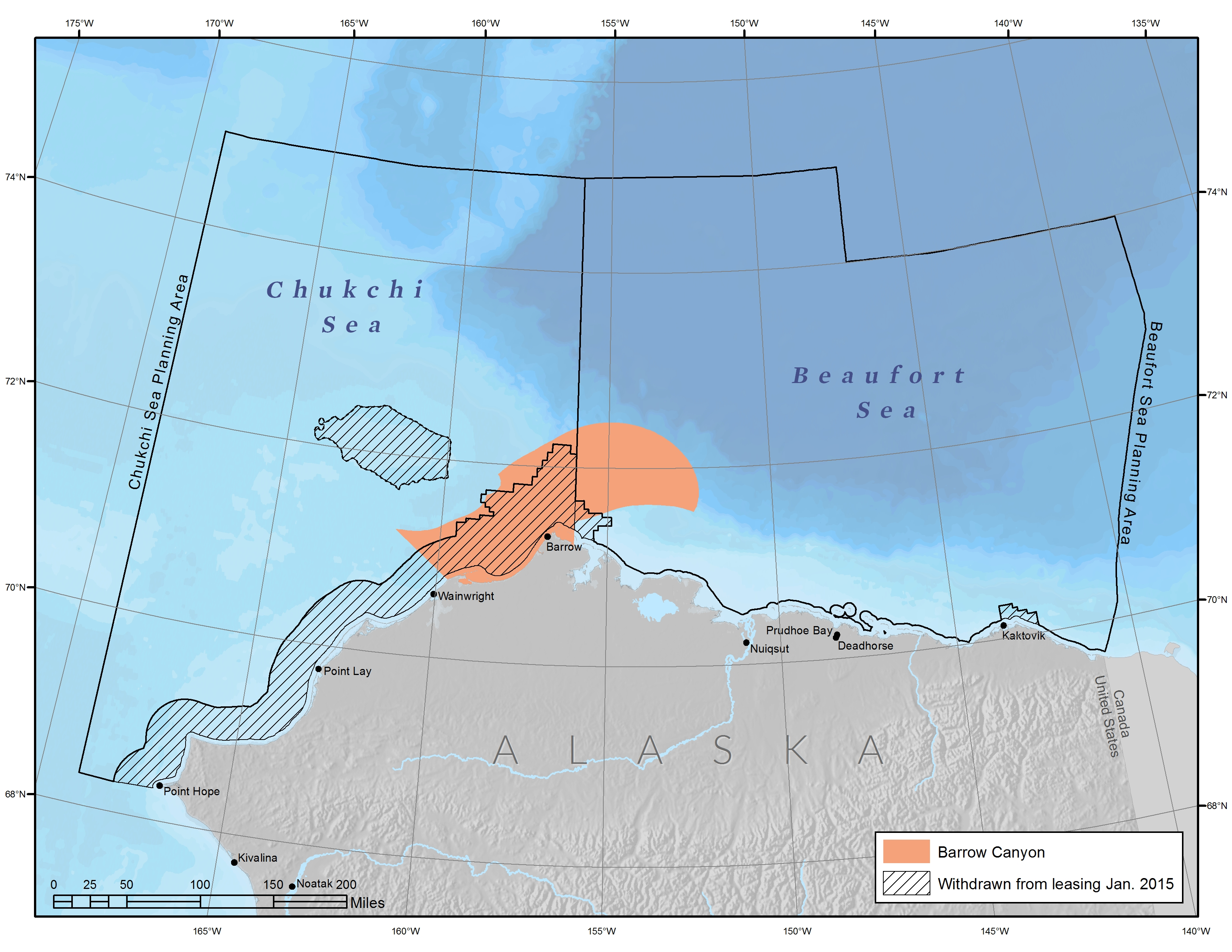
Map of Barrow Canyon in the Beaufort and Chukchi Seas in Alaska

== Geography ==
Starting roughly 95 miles west of Barrow, Alaska, Barrow Canyon stretches 150 miles along the coast, crossing into the Beaufort Sea north of Point Barrow. The canyon is roughly 15 miles wide, and reaches depths up to 1,200 feet below the surrounding cliffs and peaks.

== Fauna ==
Due to the region’s high primary productivity and high biomass of zooplankton and benthic invertebrates, Barrow Canyon is an important foraging area and concentrated migration passageway for marine mammals and birds following openings in the sea ice. Bowhead and beluga whales travel through the canyon during the spring and fall migrations. The corridor is likely used by many bird species migrating to the North Slope for summer breeding.

Several species of birds, including yellow-billed loons, spectacled eiders, king eiders, Arctic terns, black-legged kittiwakes, glaucous and Sabine's gulls, long-tailed ducks, and red phalaropes, rely on areas near the shoreline along the canyon for foraging.

Many species of marine mammals are found in Barrow Canyon throughout the year. As offshore sea ice melts, Pacific walrus rely on coastal habitat for haulouts and on the region’s rich seafloor for foraging. Beluga whales, polar bears, bowhead whales, and several species of seals, including spotted seals, bearded seals, and ringed seals, also rely on this region as an important feeding area. Gray whales cluster at the mouth of Barrow Canyon where there are large concentrations of zooplankton.

== Local use ==
Local villages rely extensively on areas influenced by the high levels of productivity at Barrow Canyon during the year. The Inupiaq whaling captains have long known about the migration route for bowhead whales and have helped scientists document important places.

== Importance ==
A 2010 study identified Barrow Canyon as a key to resilience in the Arctic marine ecosystem. Due to the unique factors that contribute to the high levels of primary productivity in the region, the canyon will likely provide ecosystem resilience to climate change into the future.

The entire Chukchi Coast, including parts of Barrow Canyon, has been designated as Essential Fish Habitat (EFH) for saffron cod and Arctic cod by the National Marine Fisheries Service. Both Arctic cod and saffron cod are critical species to the Arctic marine food web. Additionally, snow crab have been found in the area and while there is no existing fishery for them in the Arctic, they are a commercially important species in the Bering Sea.

On January 27, 2015, President Obama—using his authorities under the Outer Continental Shelf Lands Act—withdrew the Beaufort Sea Barrow whaling area from all future oil and gas leasing activity. Additionally, an additional subsistence area north of Barrow in the Chukchi Sea was deferred from leasing in the 2012–2017 Final Program. The Bureau of Ocean Energy Management's Draft Programmatic Environmental Impact Statement also recognizes additional portions of the Barrow Canyon region as Environmentally Important Areas.

== See also ==
- Blanes Canyon
