= Bering Canyon =

Submarine canyon off Alaska, USA

- Submarine canyon
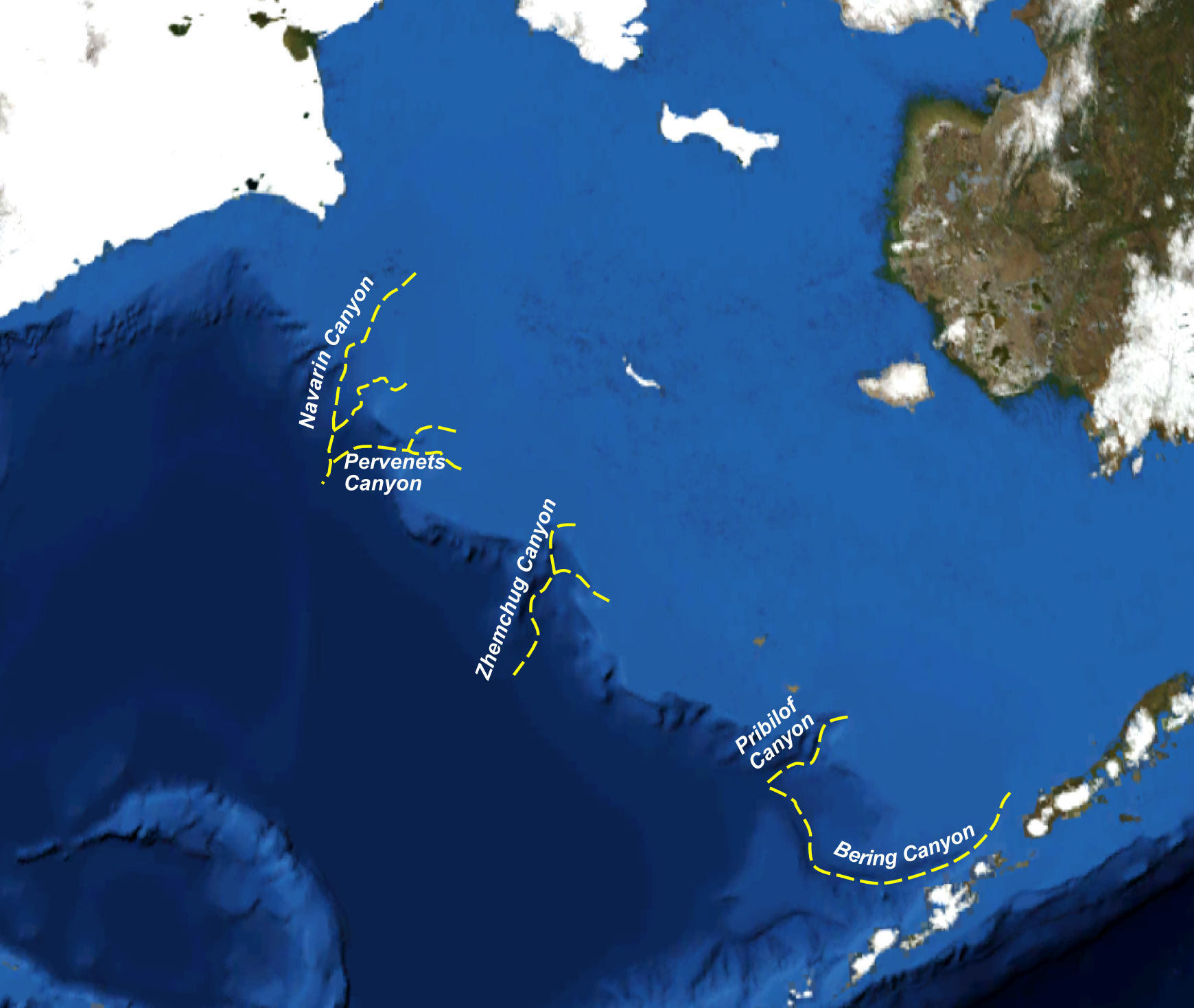
- Bering Sea showing the larger of the submarine canyons that cut the margi
- Interactive map of Bering Canyon
- Coordinates: 54°12′N 168°15′W

The Bering Canyon is the longest of the Bering Sea submarine canyons; it extends about 400 km across the Bering shelf and slope. It is confined at its eastern edge by the Aleutian Islands. The width of the canyon at the shelf break is about 65 km, only about two-thirds that of the Zhemchug Canyon and Navarin Canyons, but because of its great length, the Bering Canyon has the largest area. At a depth of 3200 m, the Bering Canyon thalweg reaches the Aleutian Basin, where a low-relief submarine channel-lobe system has developed.
