= Navarin Canyon =

Submarine canyon in the Bering Sea

- Submarine canyon
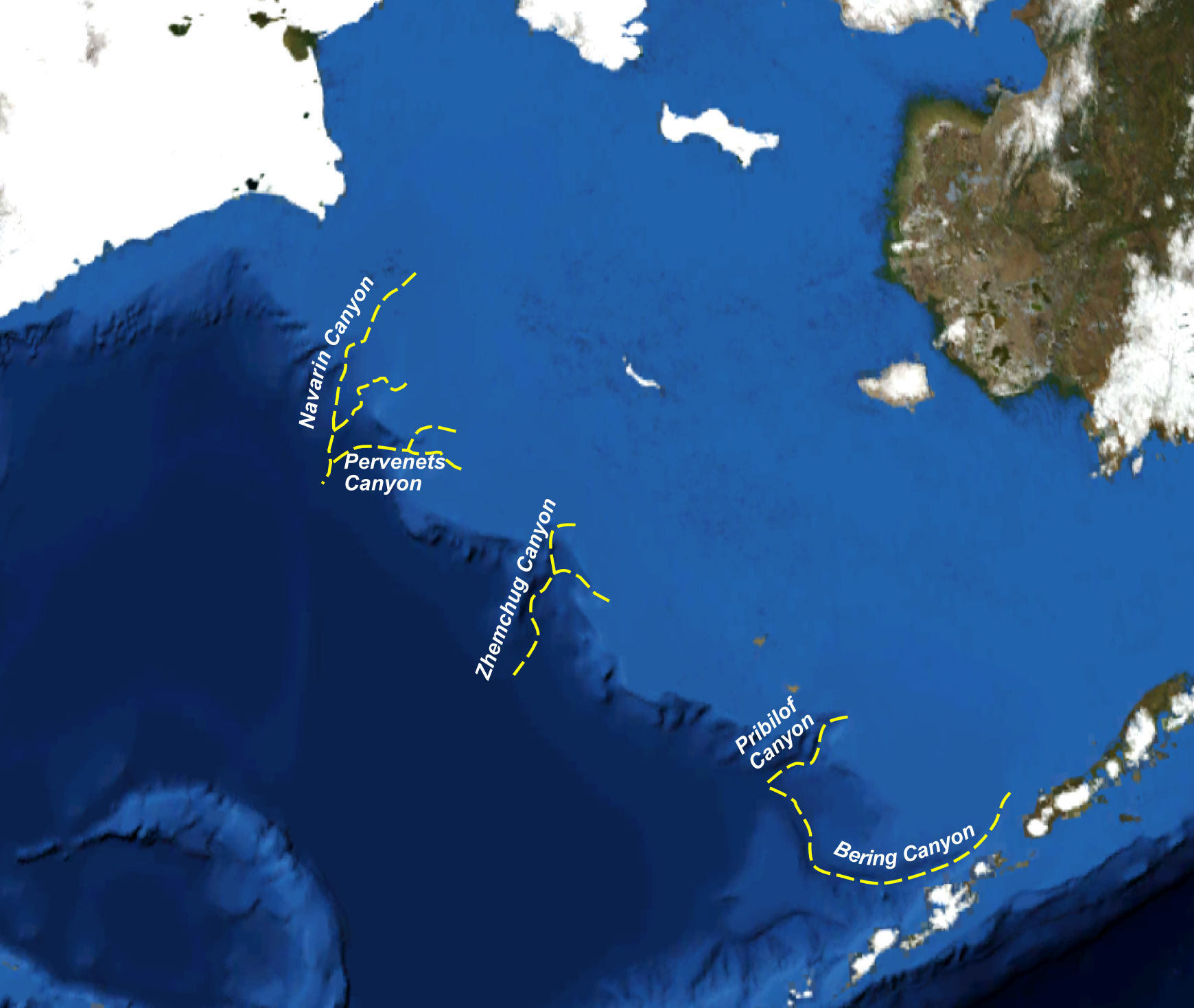
- Bering Sea showing the larger of the submarine canyons that cut the margin

The Navarin Canyon is a submarine canyon in the Bering Sea. It is just as wide but less than half as deep as the Zhemchug Canyon, which is the largest canyon in the world.

The Navarin Canyon is the third-largest to cut through the Beringian margin. It is the second-largest in area. Though these canyons were not directly formed by rivers, it is postulated that when the sea level was low during the Ice Ages, rivers such as the Yukon and the Kuskokwim may have shaped in part the heads of these canyons. At the shelf break, it is approximately 100 kilometres (62 mi) wide.
