= Pribilof Canyon =

Submarine canyon on the floor of the Bering Sea

Coordinates: 55.5832°N 169.9999°W

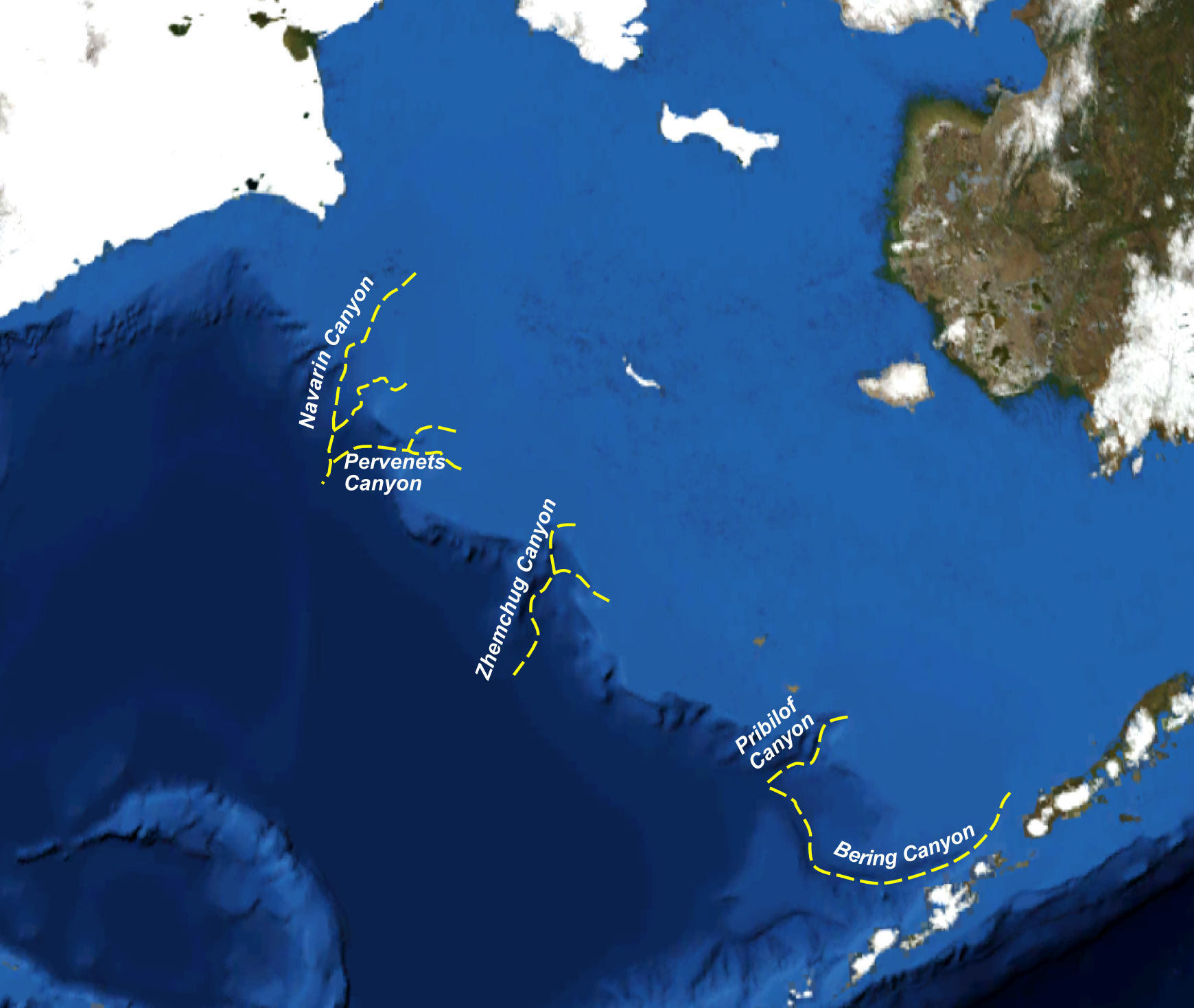
Bering Sea showing the larger of the submarine canyons that cut the margin

The Pribilof Canyon is a long submarine canyon rising from the Bering Abyssal Plain on the floor of the Bering Sea to the southeast of the Pribilof Islands in Alaska. It connects to the Bering Canyon at its west end.
