= Palamós Canyon =

Underwater canyon off the coast of Palamós in Girona, Catalonia

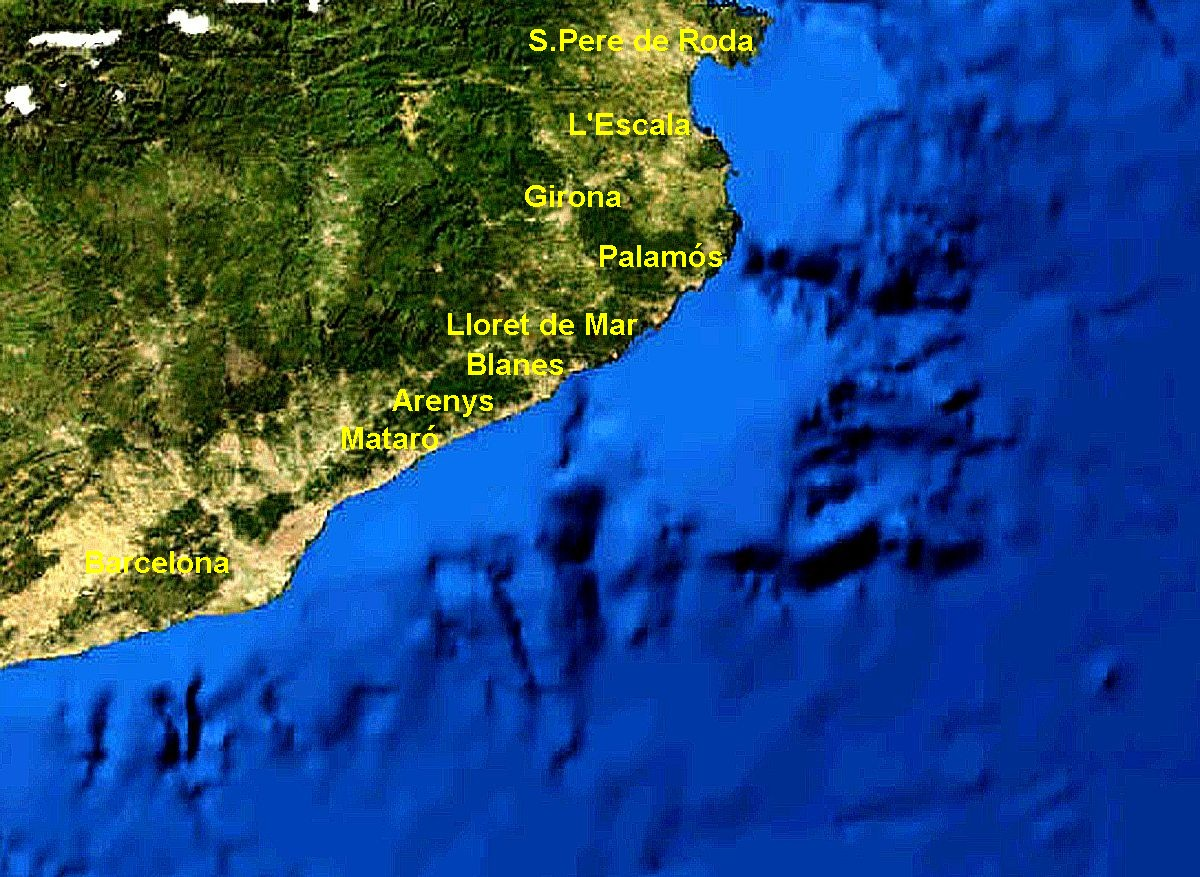

Geography
- Country: Spain
- Coordinates: 41°50′54″N 3°07′45″E

The Palamós Canyon, also known as La Fonera Canyon, is an underwater canyon that forms the underwater valley located off the coast of Palamós, in the province of Girona, Catalonia, Spain. This underwater canyon is a significant geological feature of the Balearic Sea and plays an important role in the region's marine biodiversity.

== Geography ==
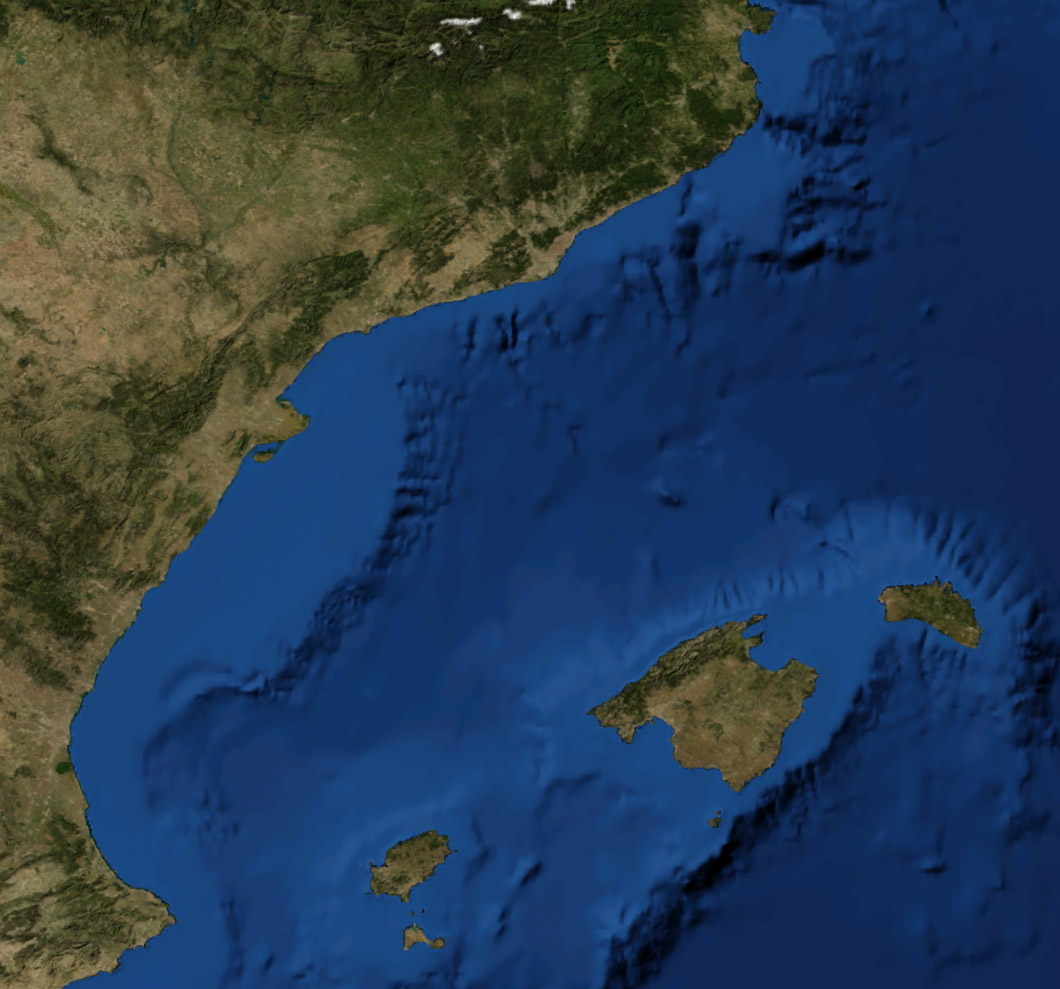
Satellite image of the Balearic Sea, showing the canyon.

The Palamós Canyon is a prominent submarine canyon located in the Northwestern Mediterranean Sea, off the coast of Catalonia, Spain. It is situated near the town of Palamós, from which it derives its name. The canyon begins at a depth of approximately 200 meters and extends down to depths exceeding 2,000 meters. The Palamós Canyon was formed through a combination of tectonic activity and sedimentary processes. It is part of the larger Catalan margin, which is characterized by its steep slopes and complex geological structures. The canyon plays a significant role in the transfer of sediments from the continental shelf to the deep sea.

== Ecological importance ==
Submarine canyons like Palamós Canyon are known for their high biodiversity and productivity. The unique topography and hydrography of the canyon create habitats for a variety of marine species, including commercially important fish and invertebrates. The canyon also serves as a conduit for organic matter, supporting deep-sea ecosystems. Is the home of a great diversity of marine species. Among the benthic organisms that inhabit the canyon are corals, sponges, and a variety of invertebrates. In addition, it is a passage area for several species of pelagic fish and marine mammals, including dolphins. Dense cold-water corals have recently been discovered on its walls, living at temperatures around 13 °C (55 °F). It is like an oasis of biodiversity, for many crustaceans and fish, with numerous species of coral and other associated species. It forms an area very rich in biodiversity, since its rocky walls are the shelter of an immense variety of organisms, some of which, like corals, sponges and gorgonians, are protected and in danger of extinction.

== Research and exploration ==
The Palamós Canyon has been the subject of various scientific studies, particularly in the fields of oceanography and marine biology. Research has shown that the canyon's sedimentary dynamics are significantly impacted by both natural and anthropogenic factors. Studies have used various methods, including autonomous hydrographic profilers and near-bottom current meters, to monitor sediment transport and water turbidity within the canyon. Research efforts have focused on understanding sediment dynamics, current patterns, and the ecological significance of the canyon. Notably, the CANYONS project deployed multiple moorings equipped with sediment traps and current meters to study the canyon's sedimentary processes.

== Human impact ==
Human activities, such as fishing and pollution, have impacted the Palamós Canyon. Efforts are being made to mitigate these impacts through sustainable fishing practices and conservation initiatives. Collaborative projects between scientists and local fishing communities aim to preserve the ecological integrity of the canyon.

== See also ==
- Blanes Canyon
- Balearic Sea
- Submarine canyon
