= Delgada Submarine Canyon =

Underwater canyon off the coast of California

Coordinates: 39°52′11″N 125°16′29″W

The Delgada Submarine Canyon is an underwater submarine canyon located off the King Range in Northern California. A million cubic meters of sediment fall into this canyon and another canyon each year. One end is near the coastline, close to Shelter Cove, part of the Lost Coast of California. The Delgada deep-sea fan is located at the mouth of the canyon.

It was originally created 10 million years ago from the San Francisco Bay drainage, and is today one of the largest geological features off the shores of North America.

The canyon's depth is 182 metres (597 ft) 1 kilometre (0.62 mi) off the coast. At a distance of 14 miles (23 km) offshore, it is 3,000 feet (910 m). The canyon follows an underwater mountain that does not have gullies. Most canyons do not do this, indicating that it has been shifted by seismic activity.
