= Amazon Canyon =

Submarine canyon in the Atlantic Ocean

Coordinates: 3.3°N 48.4°W

The Amazon Canyon is a submarine canyon within the Amazon Fan in the Atlantic Ocean, located approximately 200 mi (322 km) from the mouth of the Amazon River, near South America. It covers an area of 2,250 km^{2} (870 sq mi). It was formed in the mid to late Miocene period. The canyon is believed to have formed through mass failures, and subsequently evolved through underwater erosion. Because of its relatively small size, the canyon has been extensively mapped.

== Technical background and channel lobes ==
Continental shelves off major river deltas and estuaries act as interfaces between terrestrial environments and depositional regimes in the deep sea. They serve as a large means of carbon recycling and are a source of carbon hydrates. The Amazon River is 6,770 km long and with its numerous tributaries drains a watershed of 7,050,000 km^{2}. The Amazon Shelf in front of the Amazon delta is more than 300 km wide. Despite how closely shelf sediment composition has been studied, very few high-resolution data have been published in the past about the shelf. In one study, we see that the Amazon channel-mouth lobe complex geometry indicates a strong interaction between lobe formation and pre-existing morphology created by deposition of previous channel-levee systems and lobes and seamounts. As a result, this actually helped develop the Amazon fan lobes and overall structure.

== Organic carbon loading and processing ==
Sediment cores from the Amazon deep sea fan recovered during R/V Meteor cruise 16-2 show in detail the modern areal distribution of sedimentary organic carbon, stable organic carbon isotopes of the organic matter (OM), as well as variations in the depositional processes. One of the conclusions of this study stated that organic carbon buildup on the Amazon deep sea fan is controlled by changes in glacioeustatic sea-levels. Additionally, only 7 to 12% of the terrestrial organic carbon discharged by the Amazon River was deposited on the Amazon fan during the time span of 10,000 years. According to Schlunz et al. 1999, their calculations indicate that about 10% of today's atmospheric carbon can be deposited in a fan system like the Amazon fan during a time-span of approximately 20,000 years. This implies that as excess carbon continues to be added to atmospheric systems, many other fans like the Amazon fan can potentially have a critical role in processing this excess carbon.

== See also ==
- Submarine canyon
- Abyssal fan
- Amazon River
