= Blanes Canyon =

Submarine canyon in the Mediterranean Sea

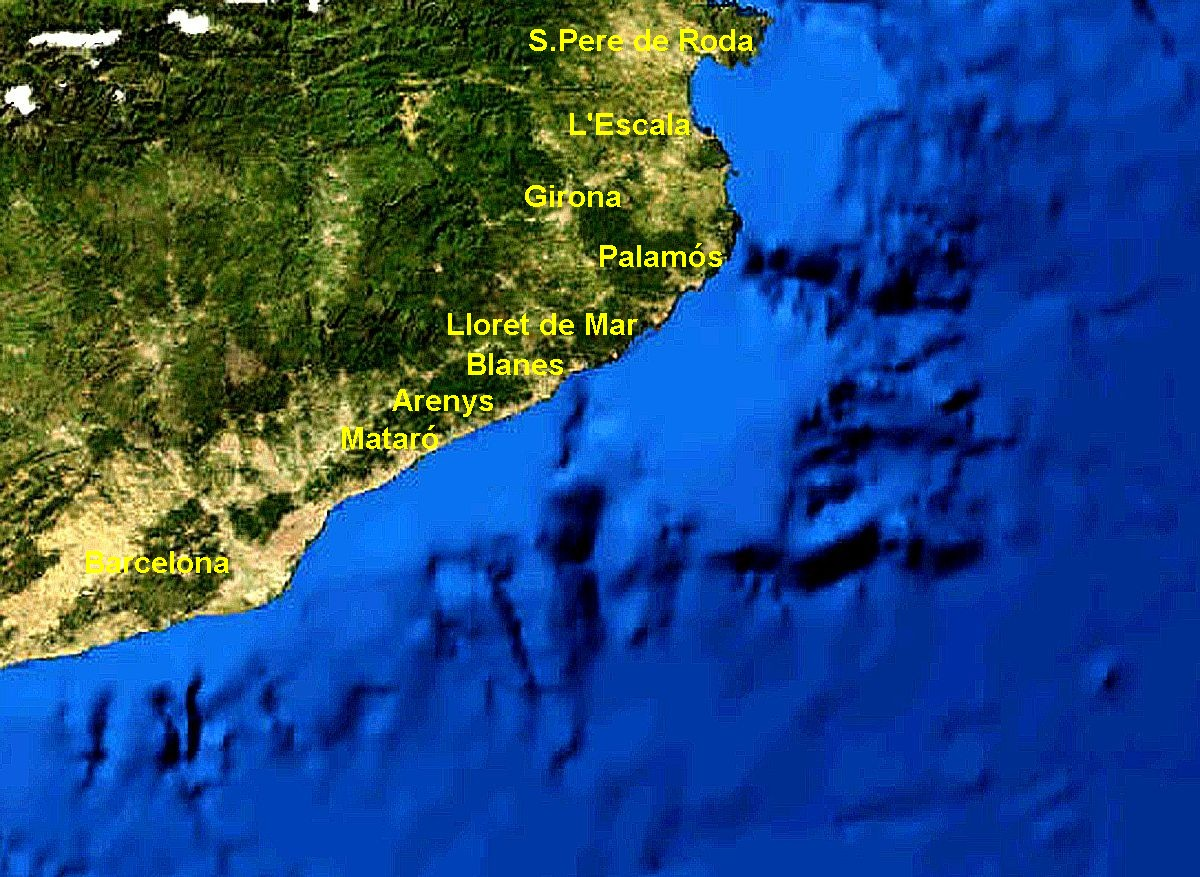

Geography
- Country: Spain
- Coordinates: 41°40′26″N 2°47′32″E

The Blanes canyon is an underwater canyon that forms the underwater valley located off the coast of Blanes, in the province of Girona, Catalonia, Spain. This underwater canyon is a significant geological feature of the Balearic Sea and plays an important role in the region's marine biodiversity.

== Geography ==
The canyon extends from the continental shelf to depths exceeding 2,000 meters (6,600 ft). Its formation is due to erosive and tectonic processes that have shaped the seabed over millions of years. Its head is about 5 kilometers (3.1 mi) from the coast, it is a valley at the bottom of the sea about 60 km (37 mi) long and one-half kilometer (0.31 mi) wide, with vertical walls that go down to a depth of about 2,300 m (7,500 ft). The mouth of the canyon is located near the mouth of the Tordera River, which contributes to the mixing of fresh and salt water in the area.

== Biodiversity ==
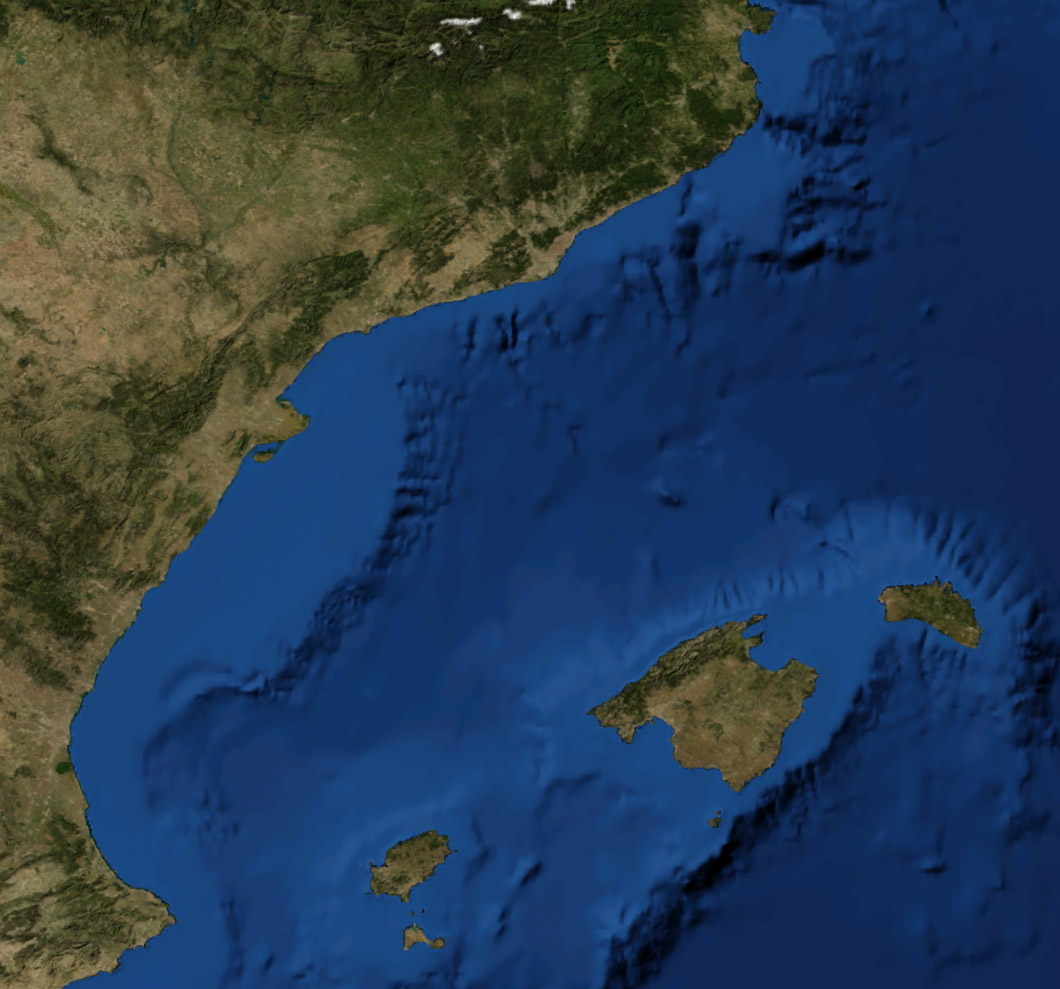
Satellite image of the Catalan-Balearic Sea, showing the canyon.

The Blanes Canyon is home to a great diversity of marine species. Among the benthic organisms that inhabit the canyon are corals, sponges, and a variety of invertebrates. In addition, it is a passage area for several species of pelagic fish and marine mammals, including dolphins. Dense cold-water corals have recently been discovered on its walls, living at temperatures around 13 °C (55 °F). It is like an oasis of biodiversity, for many crustaceans and fish, with numerous species of coral and other associated species. It forms an area very rich in biodiversity, since its rocky walls are the shelter of an immense variety of organisms, some of which, like corals, sponges and gorgonians, are protected and in danger of extinction.

== Ecological importance ==
This underwater canyon is crucial for the conservation of marine biodiversity in the Balearic Sea. The upward currents that are generated in the canyon bring nutrients from the depths to the surface, which favors biological productivity and the presence of a rich marine fauna.

== Scientific research ==
The Blanes canyon has been the subject of numerous oceanographic studies. Researchers from several institutions have explored the canyon to better understand the geological and ecological processes that take place in these depths. These studies are essential for the conservation and sustainable management of marine resources. In 2017, as part of an ICM-CSIC project aimed at studying the effect of trawling on deep marine sediments, Pere Puig's team found a large number of colonies of coral in the Blanes canyon. He did it with the help of other international researchers together with scientists from the Institute of Marine Sciences, who collaborated in the exploration of the canyon aboard the oceanographic ship of the CSIC, Sarmiento de Gamboa.

== Threats and conservation ==
Despite its ecological importance, the Blanes Canyon faces threats such as trawling and marine pollution. It is essential to implement conservation measures to protect this valuable underwater ecosystem and ensure its preservation for future generations.

== See also ==
- Palamós Canyon
- Balearic Sea
- Submarine canyon
