= Zhemchug Canyon =

Submarine canyon in the Bering Sea

Coordinates: 58.101°N 174.902°W

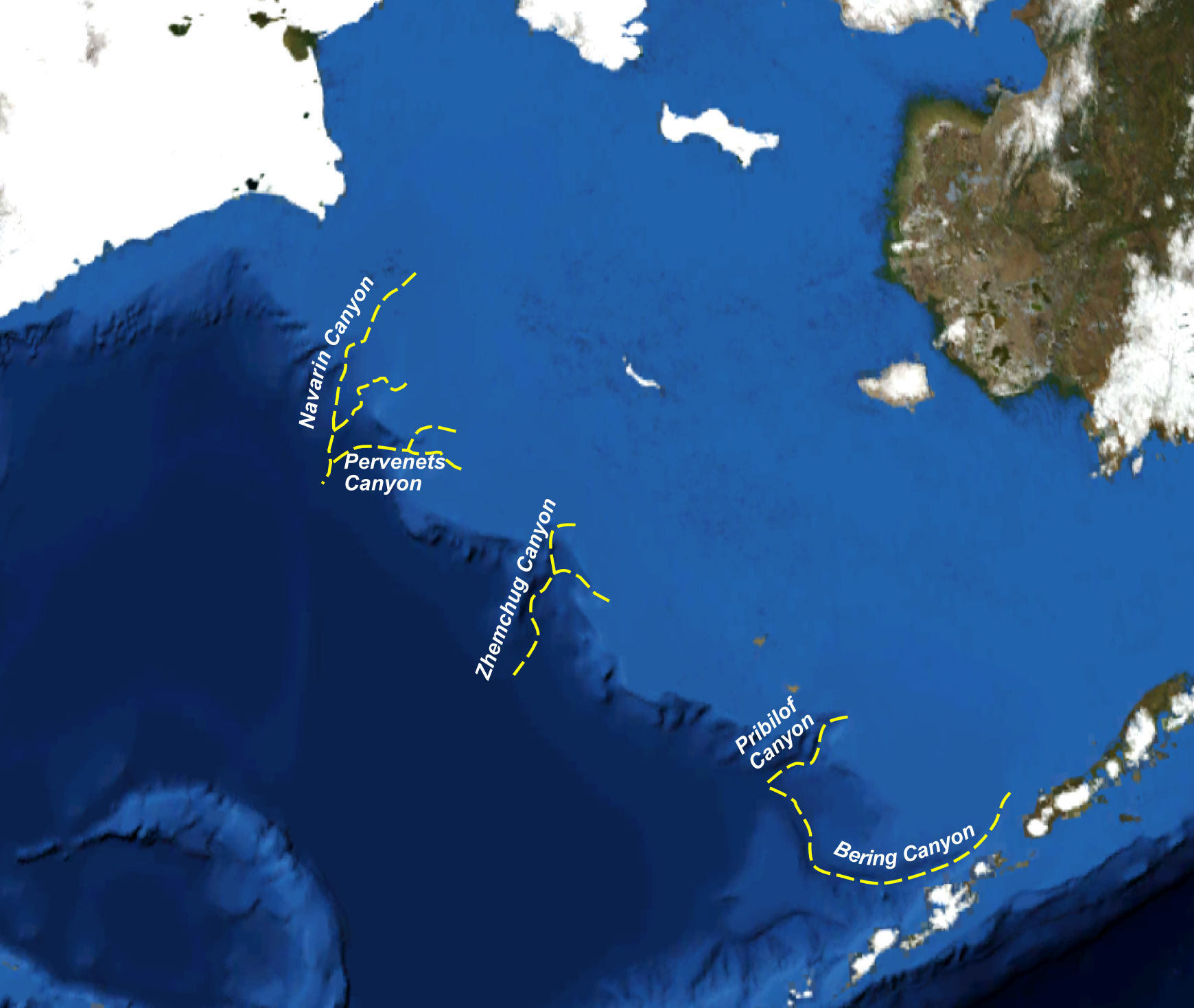
Bering Sea aerial view, showing Zhemchug Canyon in the center

Zhemchug Canyon (from the Russian жемчуг, "pearl") is an underwater canyon located in the Bering Sea between the Siberian and Alaskan coastlines. It is the deepest submarine canyon in the world with a vertical relief of 8,530 feet (2,600 meters) and a length of 99 miles (160 kilometers). The canyon is renowned for its extraordinary size and unique marine environment. It forms a significant portion of the Bering Sea's ecosystem, contributing to its biological productivity and natural habitat for a diverse range of marine species.

== Geography ==
The Zhemchug Canyon is located in the middle of the Bering Sea, between Siberia and Alaska. It has a vertical relief of 8,530 feet or 2,600 meters dropping from the shallow shelf of the Bering Sea to the depths of the Aleutian Basin and a length of 99 miles (160 kilometers). The Zhemchug Canyon is deeper than the Grand Canyon which is 6,093 feet or 1,857 meters deep. It has two main branches, each larger than typical continental margin canyons such as the Monterey Canyon. What makes the Zhemchug Canyon the world's largest is not only its great depth, but its immense cross-sectional and drainage area (11,350 km^{2}) and volume (5800 km^{3}).

The canyon holds a distinct hydrographic condition due the canyon's complex topography. The Canyon's structure impacts the local water circulation, and creates an upwelling of nutrient-rich water from the deeper regions of the oceans. This upwelling is what supports the active marine wildlife observed in the region. Additionally, the canyon interacts with other major ocean currents, such as the Bering Slope Current which flows along continental slope that brings nutrient rich water from the Arctic.

In 2016, Michelle Ridgeway explored the canyon piloting an eight-foot submarine in an expedition sponsored by Greenpeace. She reached a shelf at a depth of 1,757 feet or 536 meters, that is, a third of a mile below the surface.

== Ecology ==
The ecology of the Zhemchug Canyon holds rich biodiversity and complex food webs, supported by the canyon's unusual physical structure and oceanographic conditions. The canyon's depth, shape, and nutrient flow support a variety of habitats and marine life across varied ecological niches.

=== Phytoplankton and nutrient cycling ===
The unique contours of submarine canyons like Zhemchug create particularly favourable upwelling conditions, increasing the circulation of nutrient-rich waters from the deep seafloor; as a result, Phytoplankton density in the Canyon is significantly higher than surrounding waters. The dense Phytoplankton population serve as the Canyon's primary producers, supporting the rest of the Canyon's food web.

=== Marine fauna ===
The phytoplankton population supports a large population of zooplankton, which in turn are a key food source for a variety of fish species. The Zhemchug hosts both pelagic and demersal fish such as the Aleutian Flounder, Bering Skate, and Pacific Cod. These fish find food from the canyon and use the canyon's topography for shelter and spawning.

Species adapted to the colder and high-pressure environment live in the deeper regions of the canyon. Deep-sea sharks and cephalopods, such as the Giant Pacific Octopus, are found often along canyon walls.

=== Marine mammals and birds ===
Mammals are another integral part of the biodiversity found within the Zhemchug Canyon. Whales, seals and dolphins frequently visit the canyon because of its abundant food supply. Gray whales use the canyon edges as feeding grounds during migrations, filter-feeding through the nutrient-rich water for small crustaceans and fish. Other marine mammals feed in the Canyon, such as northern fur seals, dolphins, and whale species. The endangered short-tailed albatross congregate over the surface waters of the Canyon to feed. Puffins also rely on the marine life in the canyon waters for feeding, especially during breeding seasons when energy requirements are high.

=== Deep-sea corals and sponges ===
One of the aspects of the Zhemchug Canyon ecology is the rich community of cold-water corals and sponges. These are crucial to the health of the deep-sea ecosystem and provide habitat, shelter, and breeding grounds for numerous marine animals. Habitat-forming invertebrates such as bubblegum coral, bamboo coral, soft corals, Hexactinellid sponges, and other sponges have been identified during trawl surveys in the canyon. These corals protect organisms from predators and strong currents and provide feeding and reproduction opportunities.

== See also ==
- Submarine canyons of the Bering Sea
- Bering Sea topics
- Submarine canyon
