= Submarine canyon =

Steep-sided valley cut into the seabed of the continental slope

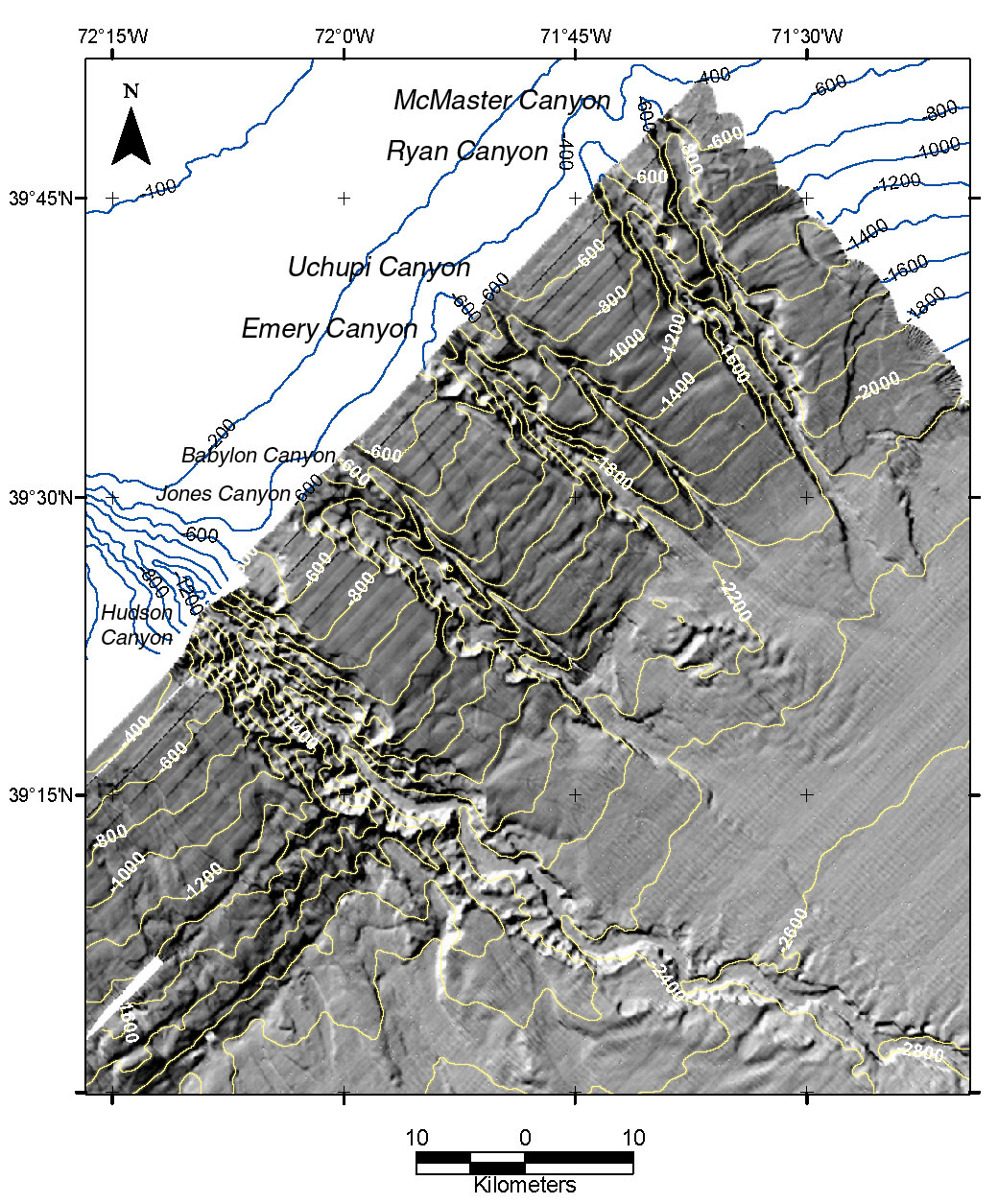
Shaded relief image of seven submarine canyons imaged on the continental slope off New York, using multibeam echosounder data. The Hudson Canyon is the furthest to the left.

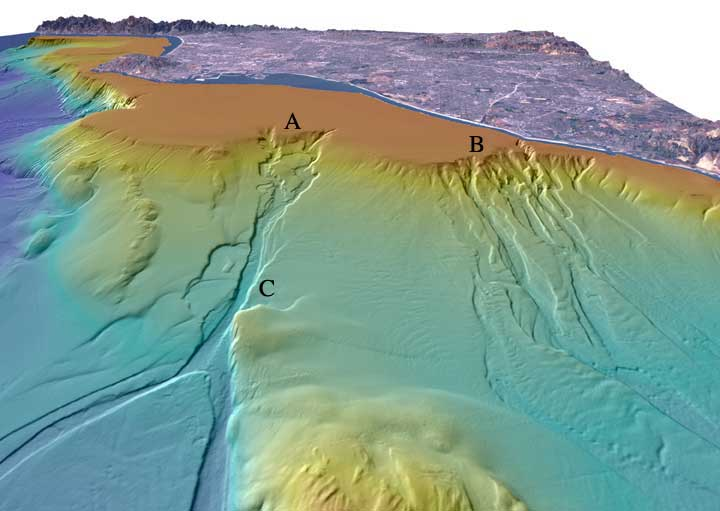
Perspective view shaded relief image of the San Gabriel and Newport submarine canyons off Los Angeles

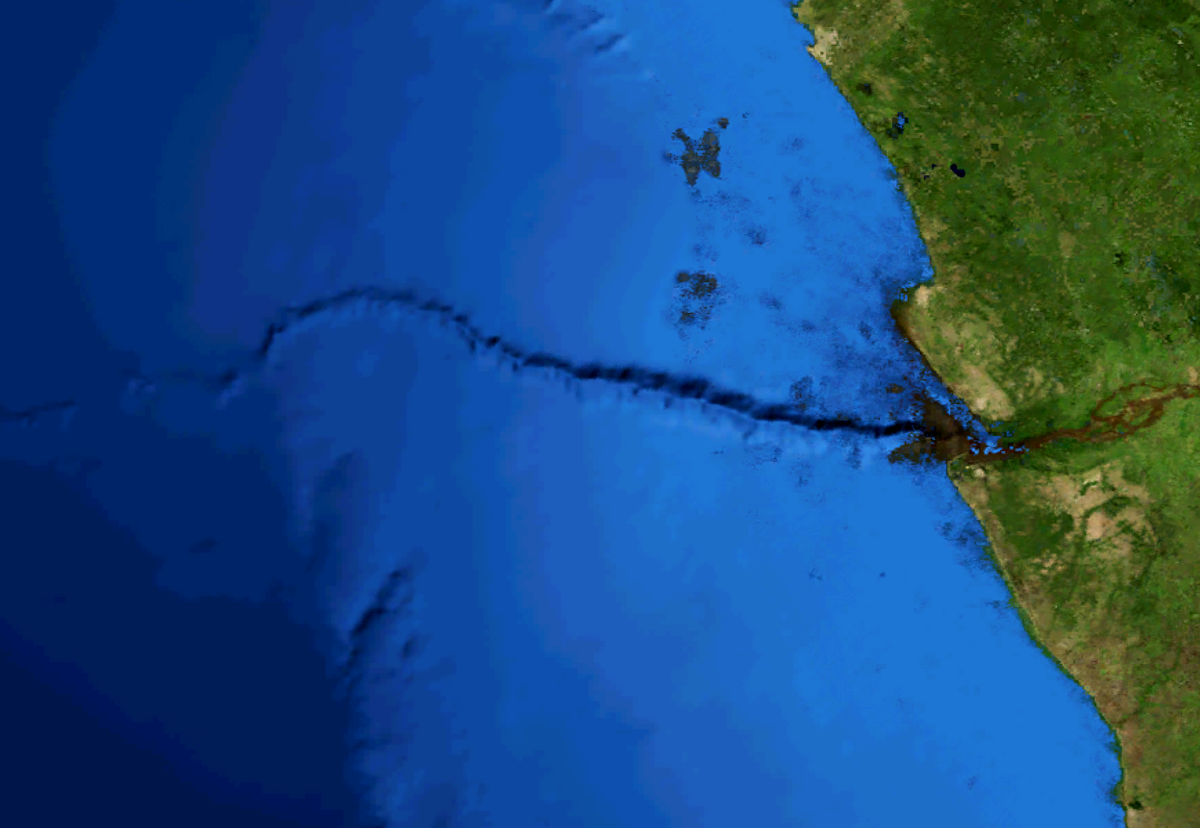
The Congo Canyon off southwestern Africa, about 300 km (190 mi) visible in this view

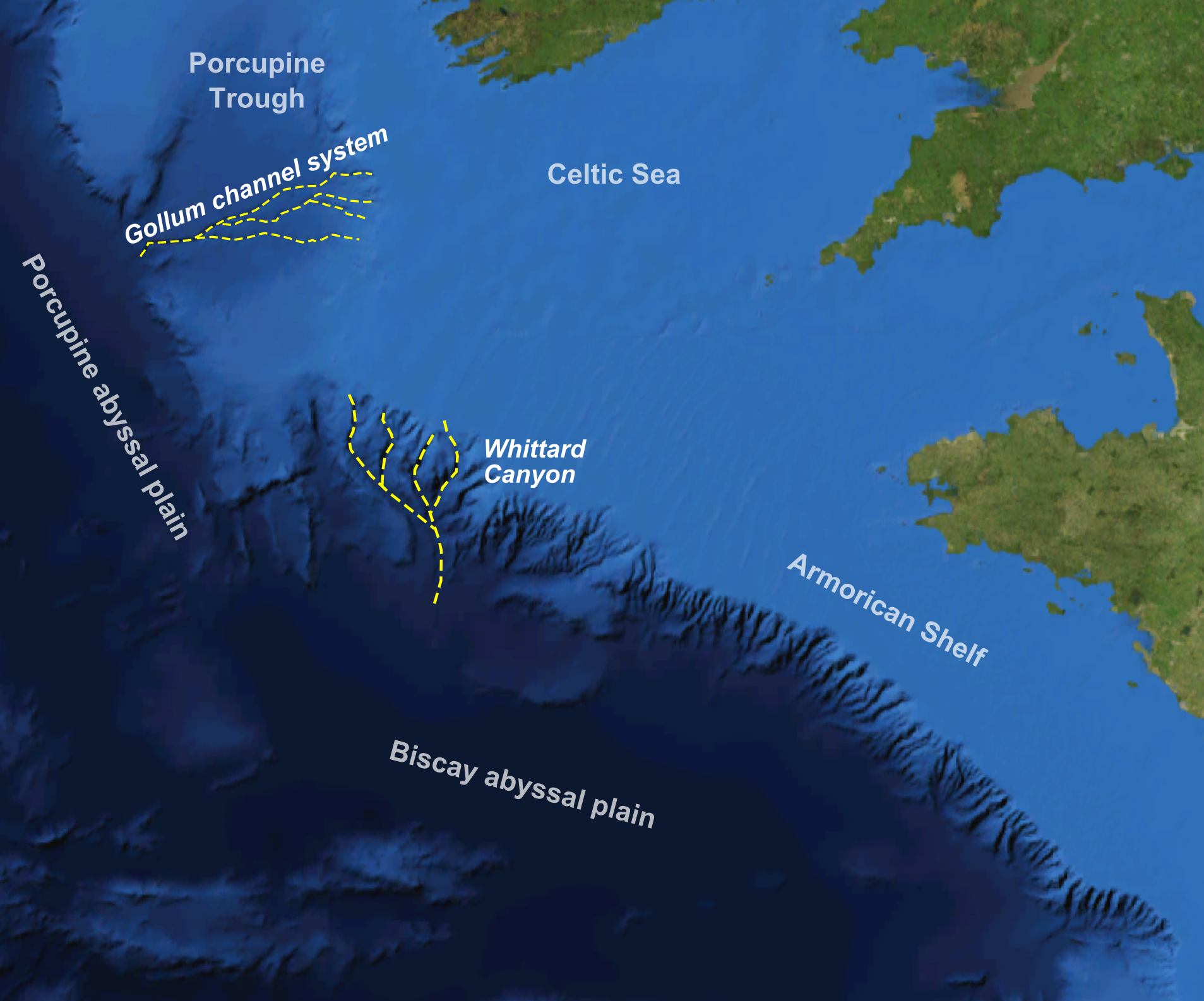
Heavily canyoned northern margin to the Biscay abyssal plain, with the Whittard Canyon highlighted

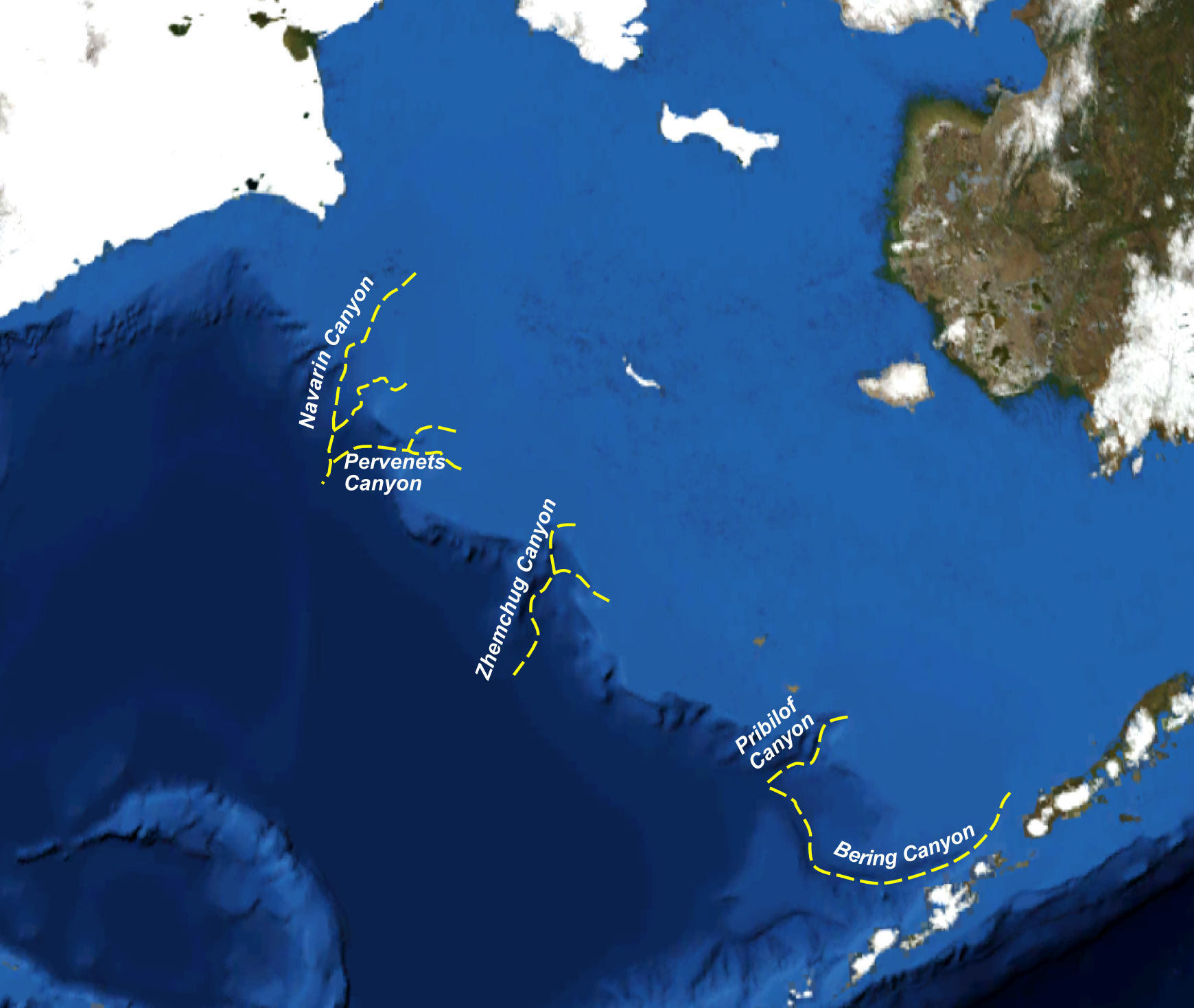
Bering Sea showing the larger of the submarine canyons that cut the margin

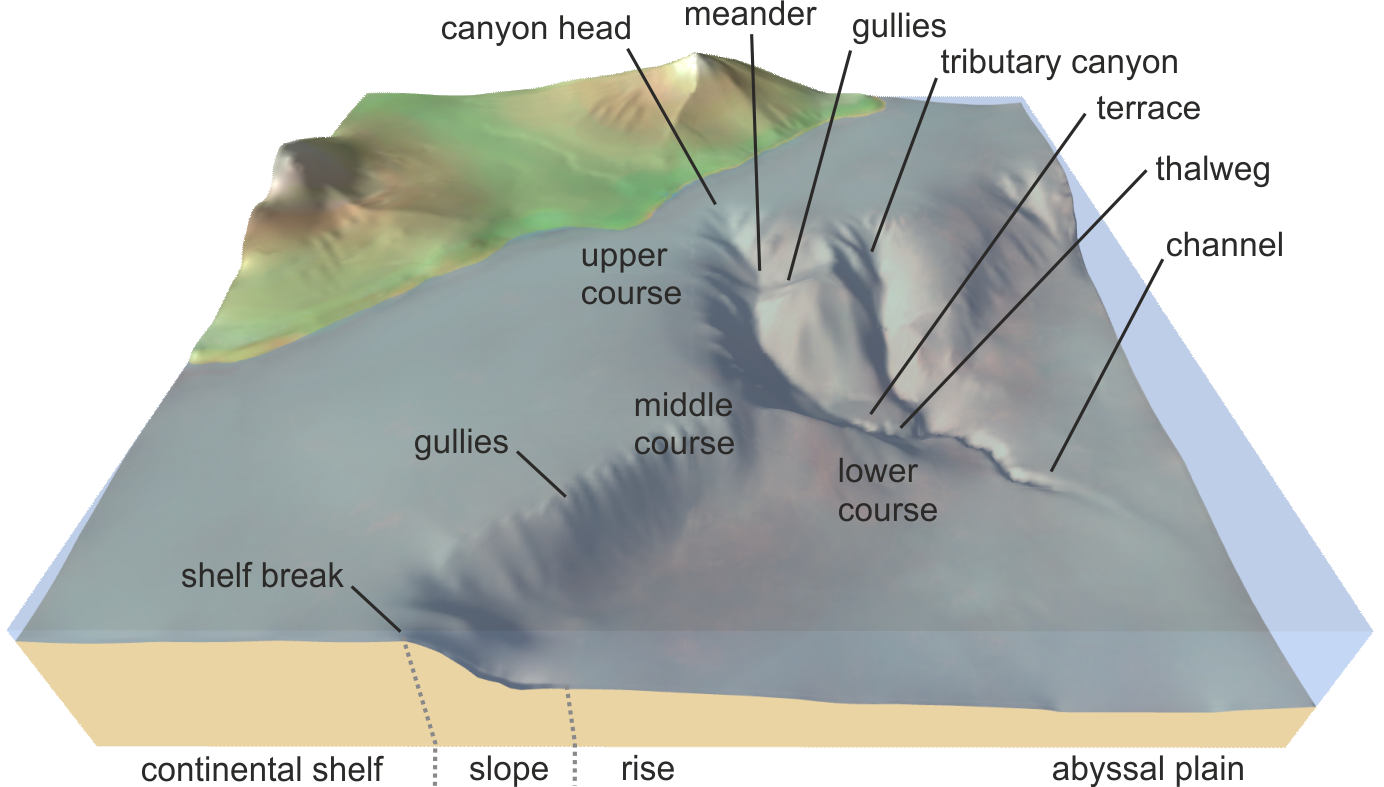
Sketch showing the main elements of a submarine canyon

A submarine canyon is a steep-sided valley cut into the seabed of the continental slope, sometimes extending well onto the continental shelf, having nearly vertical walls, and occasionally having canyon wall heights of up to 5 km (3 mi), from canyon floor to canyon rim, as with the Great Bahama Canyon. Just as above-sea-level canyons serve as channels for the flow of water across land, submarine canyons serve as channels for the flow of turbidity currents across the seafloor. Turbidity currents are flows of dense, sediment laden waters that are supplied by rivers, or generated on the seabed by storms, submarine landslides, earthquakes, and other soil disturbances. Turbidity currents travel down slope at great speed (as much as 70 km/h (43 mph)), eroding the continental slope and finally depositing sediment onto the abyssal plain, where the particles settle out.

About 3% of submarine canyons include shelf valleys that have cut transversely across continental shelves, and which begin with their upstream ends in alignment with and sometimes within the mouths of large rivers, such as the Congo River and the Hudson Canyon. About 28.5% of submarine canyons cut back into the edge of the continental shelf, whereas the majority (about 68.5%) of submarine canyons have not managed at all to cut significantly across their continental shelves, having their upstream beginnings or "heads" on the continental slope, below the edge of continental shelves.

The formation of submarine canyons is believed to occur as the result of at least two main process: 1) erosion by turbidity current erosion; and 2) slumping and mass wasting of the continental slope. While at first glance the erosion patterns of submarine canyons may appear to mimic those of river-canyons on land, several markedly different processes have been found to take place at the soil/water interface.

Many canyons have been found at depths greater than 2 km (1 mi) below sea level. Some may extend seawards across continental shelves for hundreds of kilometres before reaching the abyssal plain. Ancient examples have been found in rocks dating back to the Neoproterozoic. Turbidites are deposited at the downstream mouths or ends of canyons, building an abyssal fan.

== Characteristics ==
Submarine canyons are more common on the steep slopes found on active margins compared to those on the gentler slopes found on passive margins. They show erosion through all substrates, from unlithified sediment to crystalline rock. Canyons are steeper, shorter, more dendritic and more closely spaced on active than on passive continental margins. The walls are generally very steep and can be near vertical. The walls are subject to erosion by bioerosion, or slumping. There are an estimated 9,477 submarine canyons on Earth, covering about 11% of the continental slope.

== Examples ==
- Avilés Canyon, off the coast of Asturias, Spain, reaches depth of about 4,700 m (15,420 ft).
- Amazon Canyon, extending from the Amazon River
- Baltimore and Wilmington Canyons, East Coast of Maryland and Delaware States
- Bass Canyon, off the coast of eastern Victoria, Australia
- Blanes Canyon in the coast of Catalonia, in de Mediterranean
- Bering Canyon, in the Bering Sea
- Congo Canyon, the largest river canyon, extending from the Congo River, is 800 km (497 mi) long, and 1,200 m (3,900 ft) deep
- Delgada Submarine Canyon, off the coast of California
- Hatteras Canyon, off the coast of North Carolina
- Hudson Canyon, extending from the Hudson River
- Ganges Canyon, extending from the Ganges
- Indus Canyon, extending from the Indus River
- Kaikōura Canyon, extending offshore from the Kaikōura Peninsula, New Zealand
- La Jolla and Scripps Canyon, off the coast of La Jolla, Southern California
- Mona Canyon, off the coast of western Puerto Rico
- Monterey Canyon, off the coast of central California
- Nazaré Canyon, off the coast of Portugal, reaches abyssal depths of 5,000 m (16,404 ft)
- Perth Canyon, off the coast of Perth, Western Australia, reaches a depth of 4,000 m (13,123 ft) and contains the world's largest plunge pool
- Pribilof Canyon, in the Bering Sea
- Whittard Canyon, Atlantic Ocean off southwest Ireland
- Zhemchug Canyon the deepest and joint-widest submarine canyon in the world, in the Bering Sea

== Formation ==
Different mechanisms have been proposed for the formation of submarine canyons. Their primary causes have been subject to debate since the early 1930s.

An early and obvious theory was that the canyons present today were carved during glacial times, when sea level was about 125 meters (410 ft) below present sea level, and rivers flowed to the edge of the continental shelf. However, while many (but not all) canyons are found offshore from major rivers, subaerial river erosion cannot have been active to the water depths as great as 3,000 meters (9,800 ft) where canyons have been mapped, as it is well established (by many lines of evidence) that sea levels did not fall to those depths.

The major mechanism of canyon erosion is thought to be turbidity currents and underwater landslides. Turbidity currents are dense, sediment-laden currents which flow downslope when an unstable mass of sediment that has been rapidly deposited on the upper slope fails, perhaps triggered by earthquakes. There is a spectrum of turbidity- or density-current types ranging from "muddy water" to massive mudflow, and evidence of both these end members can be observed in deposits associated with the deeper parts of submarine canyons and channels, such as lobate deposits (mudflow) and levees along channels.

Mass wasting, slumping, and submarine landslides are forms of slope failures (the effect of gravity on a hillslope) observed in submarine canyons. Mass wasting is the term used for the slower and smaller action of material moving downhill. Slumping is generally used for rotational movement of masses on a hillside. Landslides, or slides, generally comprise the detachment and displacement of sediment masses.

It is now understood that many mechanisms of submarine canyon creation have had effect to greater or lesser degree in different places, even within the same canyon, or at different times during a canyon's development. However, if a primary mechanism must be selected, the downslope lineal morphology of canyons and channels and the transportation of excavated or loose materials of the continental slope over extensive distances require that various kinds of turbidity or density currents act as major participants.

In addition to the processes described above, submarine canyons that are especially deep may form by another method. In certain cases, a sea with a bed significantly below sea level is cut off from the larger ocean to which it is usually connected. The sea which is normally repleted by contact and inflow from the ocean is now no longer replenished and hence dries up over a period of time, which can be very short if the local climate is arid. In this scenario, rivers that previously flowed into the sea at a sea level elevation now can cut far deeper into the bottom of the bed now exposed. The Messinian salinity crisis is an example of this phenomenon; between five and six million years ago, the Mediterranean Sea became isolated from the Atlantic Ocean and evaporated away in roughly a thousand years. During this time, the Nile River delta, among other rivers, extended far beyond its present location, both in depth and length. In a cataclysmic event, the Mediterranean sea basin was flooded. One relevant consequence is that the submarine canyons eroded are now far below the present sea level.

== See also ==
- List of submarine canyons
- List of submarine topographical features
- Passive margin
