= Bering Sea =

Sea of the northern Pacific Ocean off the coast of Alaska and Russia

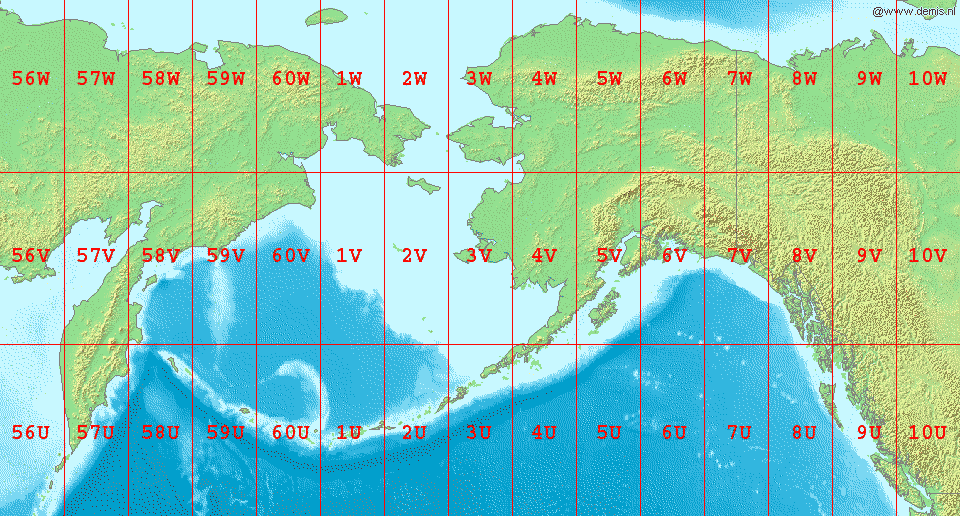
- Map showing the location of the Bering Sea with latitude and longitude zones of the Universal Transverse Mercator coordinate system

- Location within Alaska
- Coordinates: 58°0′N 178°0′W
- Basin countries: Russia and United States
- Surface area: 2,000,000 km^{2} (770,000 sq mi)

The Bering Sea (/ˈbɛərɪŋ, ˈbɛrɪŋ/ BAIR-ing, BERR-ing, US also /ˈbɪərɪŋ/ BEER-ing; Russian: Бе́рингово мо́ре, romanized: Béringovo móre, IPA: [ˈbʲerʲɪnɡəvə ˈmorʲe]) is a marginal sea of the Northern Pacific Ocean. It forms, along with the Bering Strait, the divide between the two largest landmasses on Earth: Eurasia and the Americas. It comprises a deep water basin, which then rises through a narrow slope into the shallower water above the continental shelves. The Bering Sea is named after Vitus Bering, a Danish-born Russian navigator, who, in 1728, was the first European to systematically explore it, sailing from the Pacific Ocean northward to the Arctic Ocean.

The Bering Sea is separated from the Gulf of Alaska by the Alaska Peninsula. It covers over 2,000,000 square kilometers (770,000 sq mi) and is bordered on the east and northeast by Alaska, on the west by the Russian Far East and the Kamchatka Peninsula, on the south by the Alaska Peninsula and the Aleutian Islands and on the far north by the Bering Strait, which connects the Bering Sea to the Arctic Ocean's Chukchi Sea. Bristol Bay is the portion of the Bering Sea between the Alaska Peninsula and Cape Newenham on mainland Southwest Alaska.

The Bering Sea ecosystem includes resources within the jurisdiction of the United States and Russia, as well as international waters in the middle of the sea (known as the "Donut Hole"). The interaction between currents, sea ice, and weather makes for a vigorous and productive ecosystem.

== History ==
Most scientists think that during the last glacial period, sea level was low enough to allow humans to migrate east on foot from Asia to North America across what is now the Bering Strait. Other animals including megafauna migrated in both directions. This is commonly referred to as the "Bering land bridge" and is accepted by most, though not all scientists, to be the first point of entry of humans into the Americas.

There is a small portion of the Kula plate in the Bering Sea. The Kula plate is an ancient tectonic plate that used to subduct under Alaska.

On 18 December 2018, a large meteor exploded above the Bering Sea. The meteor exploded at an altitude of 25.6km, releasing 49 kilotons of energy.

== Geography ==
=== Extent ===
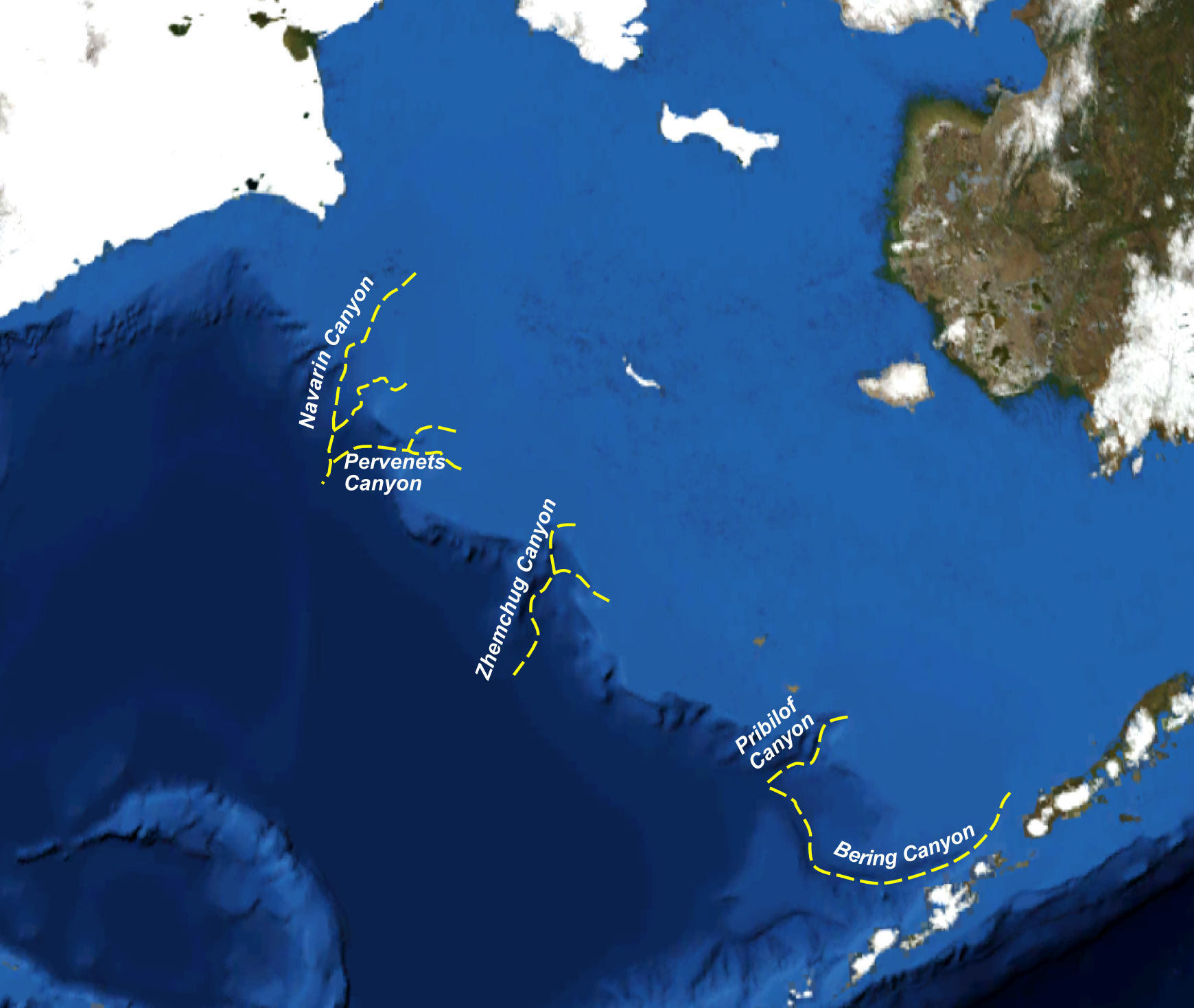
Bering Sea showing the larger of the submarine canyons that cut the margin

The International Hydrographic Organization defines the limits of the Bering Sea as follows:

On the North. The Southern limit of the Chuckchi Sea [sic] [The Arctic Circle between Siberia and Alaska]

On the South. A line running from Kabuch Point (54°48′N 163°21′W) in the Alaskan Peninsula, through the Aleutian Islands to the South extremes of the Komandorski Islands and on to Cape Kamchatka in such a way that all the narrow waters between Alaska and Kamchatka are included in the Bering Sea.

=== Islands ===
Islands of the Bering Sea include:

- Pribilof Islands, including St. Paul Island
- Komandorski Islands, including Bering Island
- St. Lawrence Island
- Diomede Islands
- King Island
- St. Matthew Island
- Karaginsky Island
- Nunivak Island
- Sledge Island
- Hagemeister Island

=== Regions ===
Regions of the Bering Sea include:

- Bering Strait
- Bristol Bay
- Gulf of Anadyr
- Norton Sound

The Bering Sea contains 16 submarine canyons including the largest submarine canyon in the world, Zhemchug Canyon.

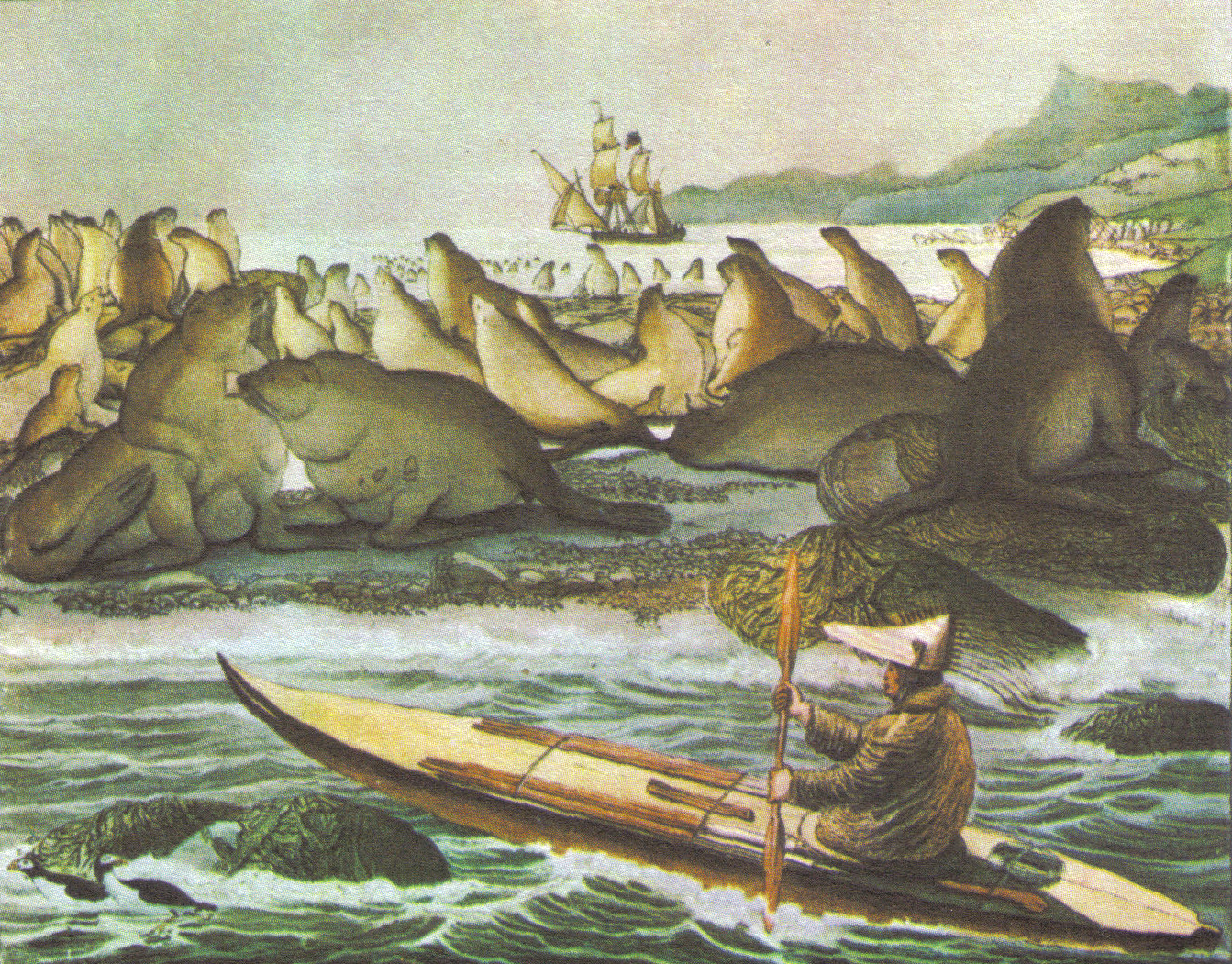
The Russian "Rurik" sets anchor near Saint Paul Island in the Bering Sea in order to load food and equipment for the expedition to the Chukchi sea in the north. Drawing by Louis Choris in 1817.

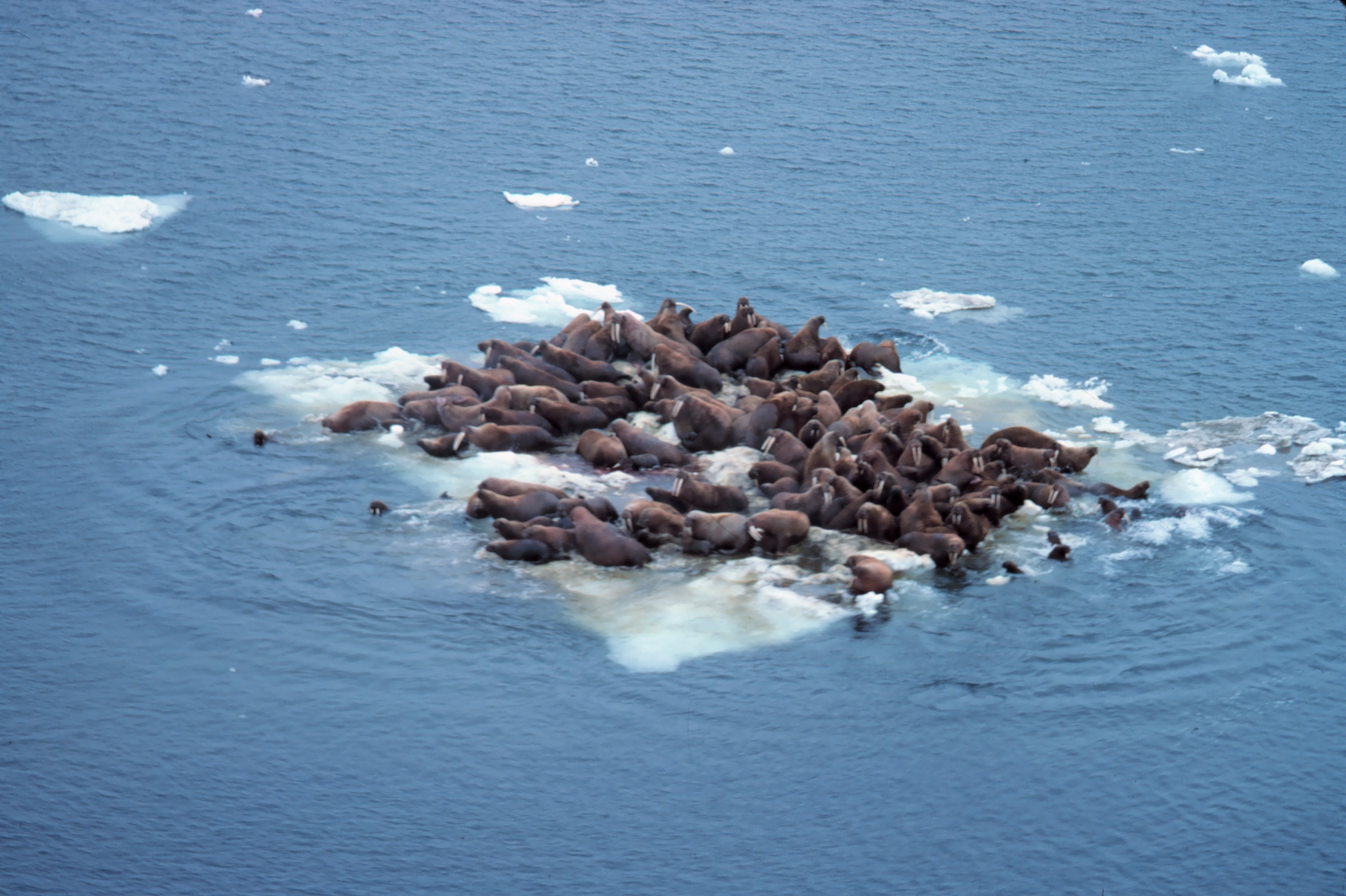
Walrus (Odobenus rosmarus divergens), hauled out on Bering Sea ice, Alaska, June 1978. (Source: NOAA)

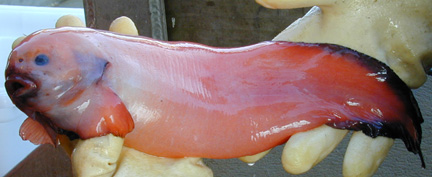
Snailfish, a non-commercial fish, caught in the eastern Bering Sea

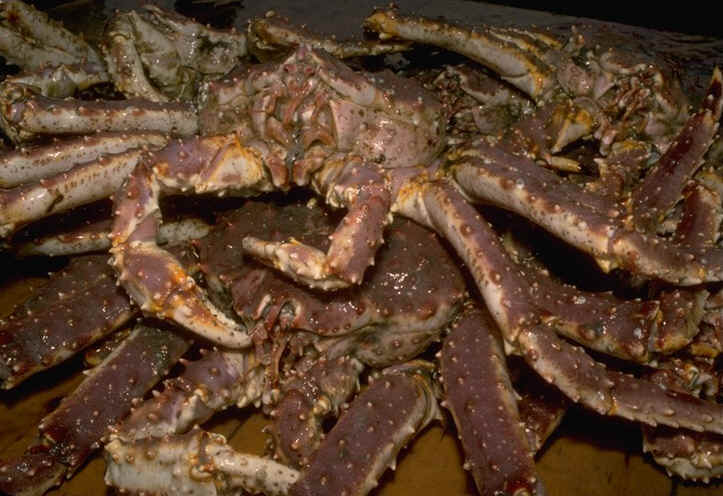
Red king crab

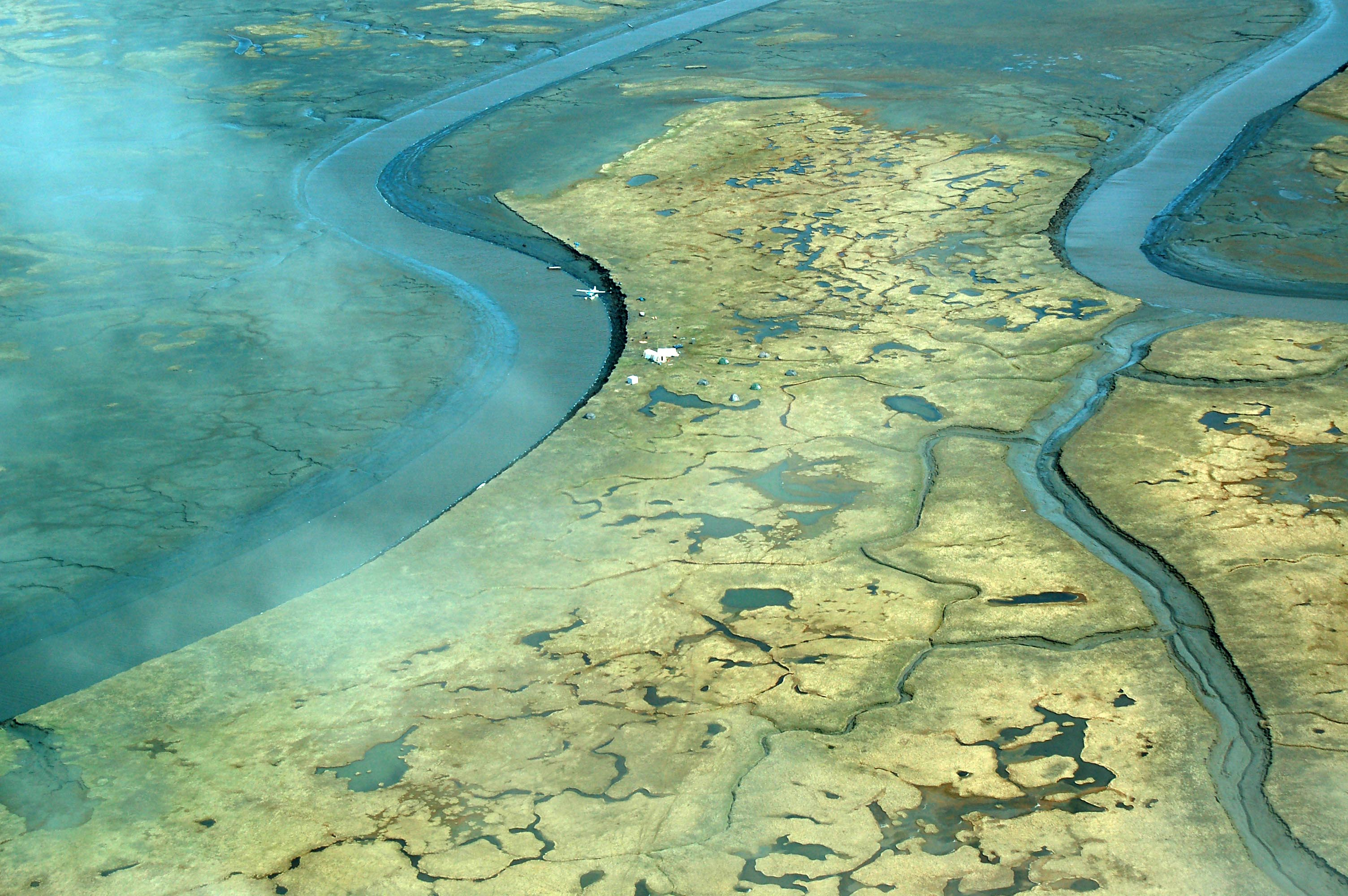
Aerial view of Tutakoke Bird Camp on the coast of the Bering Sea, south of Hooper Bay

== Ecosystem ==
The Bering Sea shelf break is the dominant driver of primary productivity in the Bering Sea. This zone, where the shallower continental shelf drops off into the North Aleutians Basin is also known as the "Greenbelt". Nutrient upwelling from the cold waters of the Aleutian basin flowing up the slope and mixing with shallower waters of the shelf provide for constant production of phytoplankton.

The second driver of productivity in the Bering Sea is seasonal sea ice that, in part, triggers the spring phytoplankton bloom. Seasonal melting of sea ice causes an influx of lower salinity water into the middle and other shelf areas, causing stratification and hydrographic effects which influence productivity. In addition to the hydrographic and productivity influence of melting sea ice, the ice itself also provides an attachment substrate for the growth of algae as well as interstitial ice algae.

Some evidence suggests that great changes to the Bering Sea ecosystem have already occurred. Warm water conditions in the summer of 1997 resulted in a massive bloom of low energy coccolithophorid phytoplankton (Stockwell et al. 2001). A long record of carbon isotopes, which is reflective of primary production trends of the Bering Sea, exists from historical samples of bowhead whale baleen. Trends in carbon isotope ratios in whale baleen samples suggest that a 30–40% decline in average seasonal primary productivity has occurred over the last 50 years. The implication is that the carrying capacity of the Bering Sea is much lower now than it has been in the past.

== Biodiversity ==
The sea supports many whale species, including the beluga, humpback whale, bowhead whale, gray whale and blue whale, the vulnerable sperm whale, and the endangered fin whale, sei whale and the rarest in the world, the North Pacific right whale. Other marine mammals include walrus, Steller sea lion, northern fur seal, orca and polar bear.

The Bering Sea is very important to the seabirds of the world. Over 30 species of seabirds and approximately 20 million individuals breed in the Bering Sea region. Seabird species include tufted puffins, the endangered short-tailed albatross, spectacled eider, and red-legged kittiwakes. Many of these species are unique to the area, which provides highly productive foraging habitat, particularly along the shelf edge and in other nutrient-rich upwelling regions, such as the Pribilof, Zhemchug, and Pervenets canyons. The Bering Sea is also home to colonies of crested auklets, with upwards of a million individuals.

Two Bering Sea species, the Steller's sea cow (Hydrodamalis gigas) and spectacled cormorant (Phalacrocorax perspicillatus), are extinct because of overexploitation by man. In addition, a small subspecies of Canada goose, the Bering Canada goose (Branta canadensis asiatica) is extinct due to overhunting and the introduction of rats to their breeding islands.

The Bering Sea supports many species of fish, some of which support large and valuable commercial fisheries. Commercial fish species include Pacific cod, several species of flatfish, sablefish, Pacific salmon, and Pacific herring. Shellfish include red king crab and snow crab.

Fish biodiversity is high, and at least 419 species of fish have been reported from the Bering Sea.

== Fisheries ==
The Bering Sea is world-known for its fisheries, such as king crab, opilio and tanner crabs, Bristol Bay salmon, pollock and other groundfish. These fisheries rely on the productivity of the Bering strait food web.

Commercial fishing is lucrative business in the Bering Sea, which is relied upon by the largest seafood companies in the world to produce fish and shellfish. On the U.S. side, commercial fisheries catch approximately $1 billion worth of seafood annually, while Russian Bering Sea fisheries are worth approximately $600 million annually.

The Bering Sea also serves as the central location of the Alaskan king crab and snow crab seasons, which are chronicled on the Discovery Channel television program Deadliest Catch. Landings from Alaskan waters represents half the U.S. catch of fish and shellfish.

== Change ==
Because of the changes going on in the Arctic, the future evolution of the Bering Sea climate and ecosystem is uncertain. Between 1979 and 2012, the region experienced small growth in sea ice extent, standing in contrast to the substantial loss of summer sea ice in the Arctic Ocean to the north.

== In media ==
'The White Seal', one of many chapters on Rudyard Kipling's The Jungle Book, features the Bering Sea as the birthplace and homeland of Kotick, a rare white fur seal.

The film Harbinger Down, which was released on August 7, 2015, was about a group of grad students who booked passage on the crabbing boat Harbinger to study the effects of global warming on a pod of beluga whales in the Bering Sea.

One of the central characters in the 1949 film Down to the Sea in Ships has the given name "Bering" due to having been born in a ship crossing the Bering Sea.

The 2002 supernatural thriller, Ghost Ship, directed by Steve Beck, follows a marine salvage crew in the Bering Sea who discover the lost Italian ocean liner, Antonia Graza that disappeared in 1962.

== Gallery ==
In the top-right corner of the image is Alaska's mainland blanketed with snow, as well as Nunivak Island. At the centre of the image are the islands of Saint Paul and Saint George – part of the Pribilof Islands. Also note the von Kármán vortex street (swirly clouds) in the middle right.

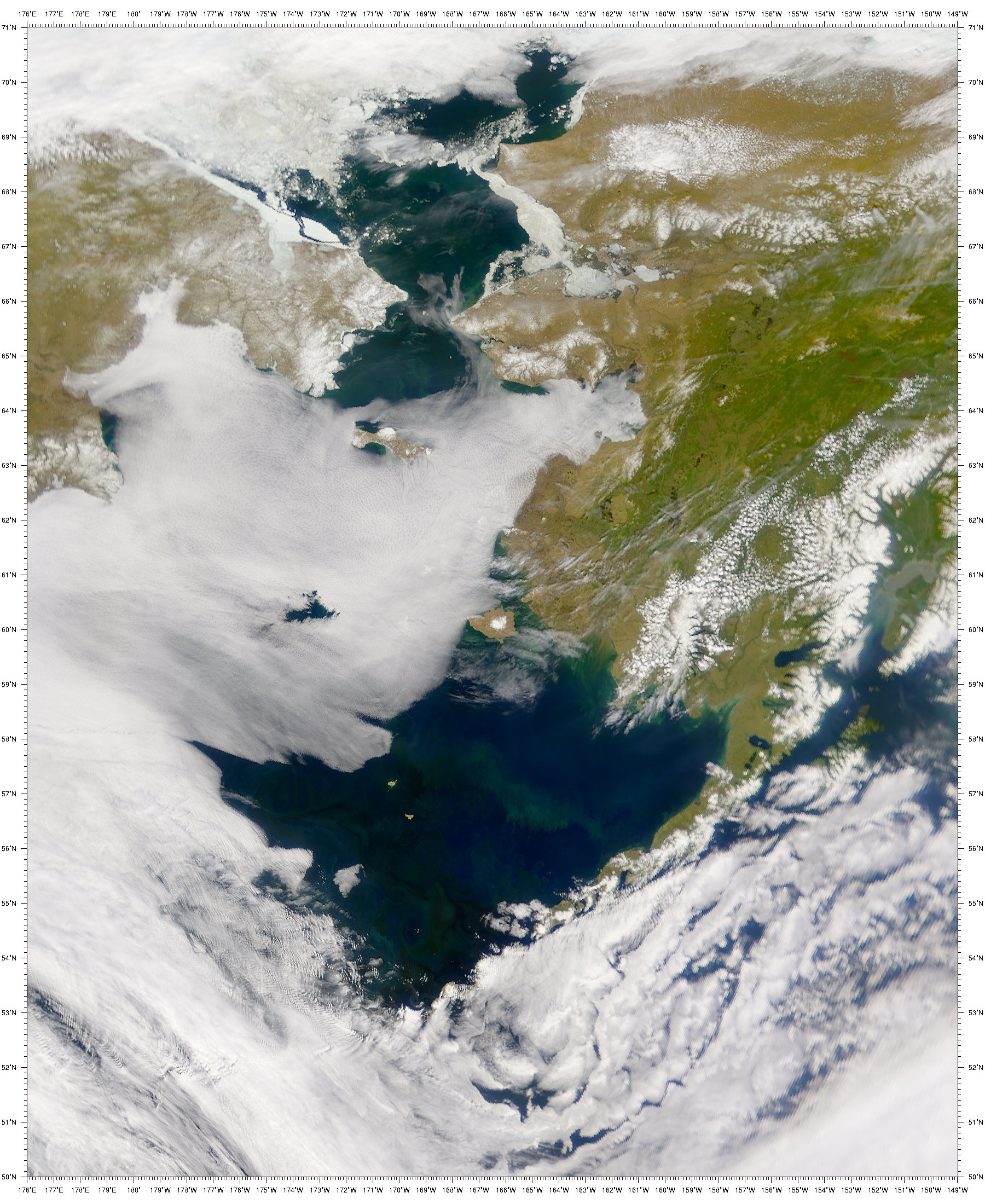
Satellite photo of the Bering Sea – Alaska is on the top right, Siberia on the top left

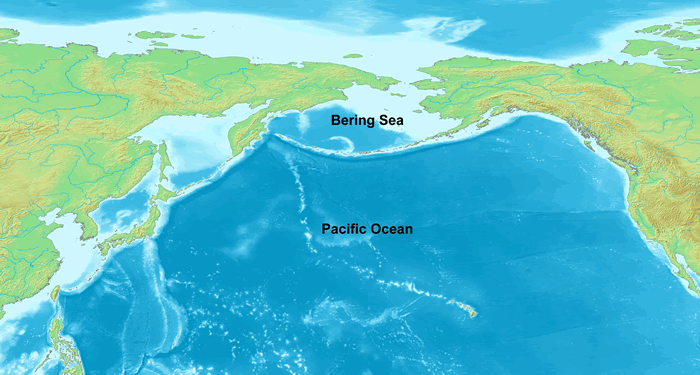
Bering Sea in the North Pacific Ocean

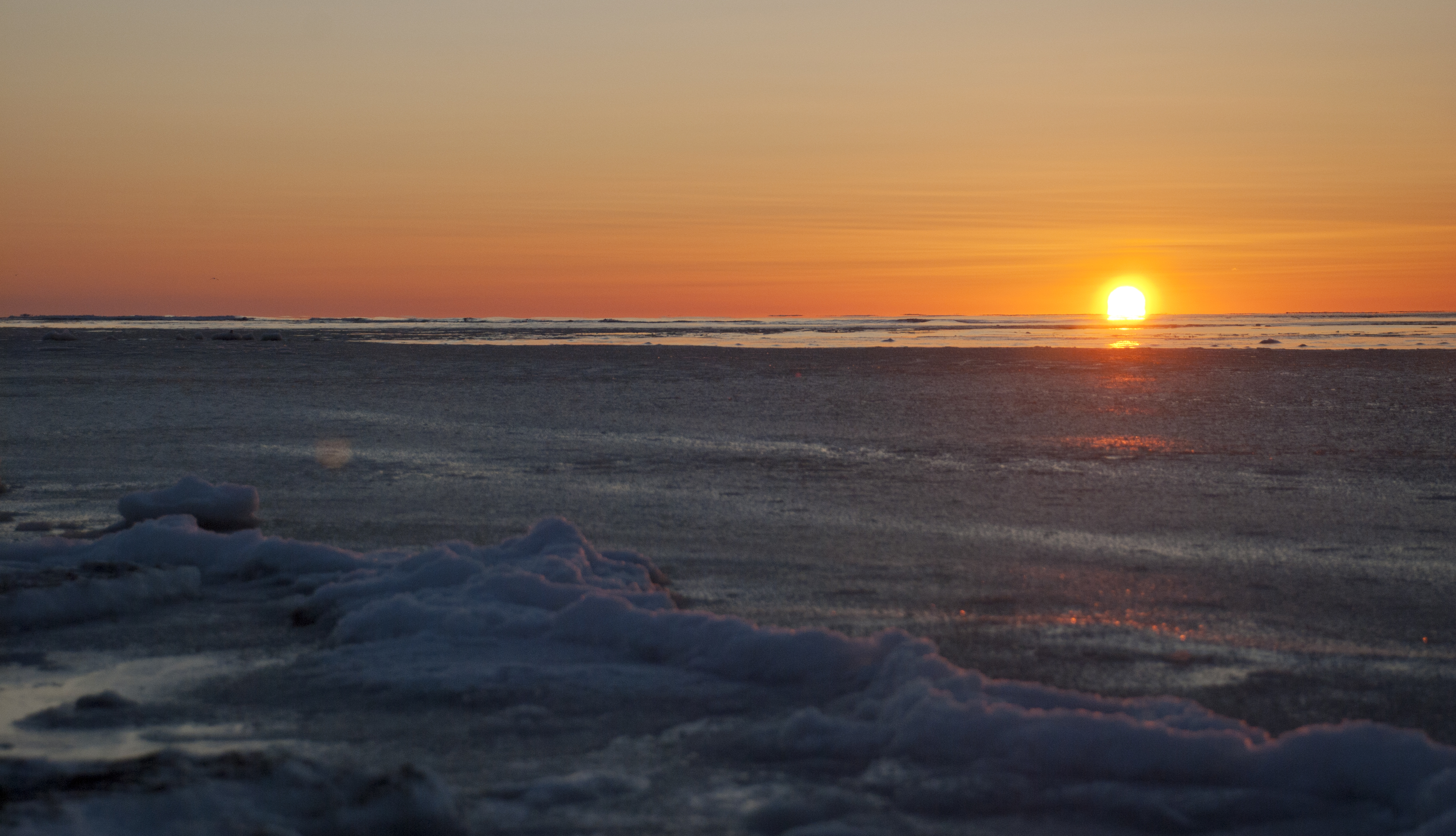
Sunrise at the Bering sea.

== See also ==
- Beringia - name for the dry land that included the northeast third of today's Bering Sea during the last Ice Age
- Bering Sea Arbitration
- List of seas
- Northern Bering Sea Climate Resilience Area
- Timeline of environmental events
