= Economy of Chongqing =

Chinese municipal economy

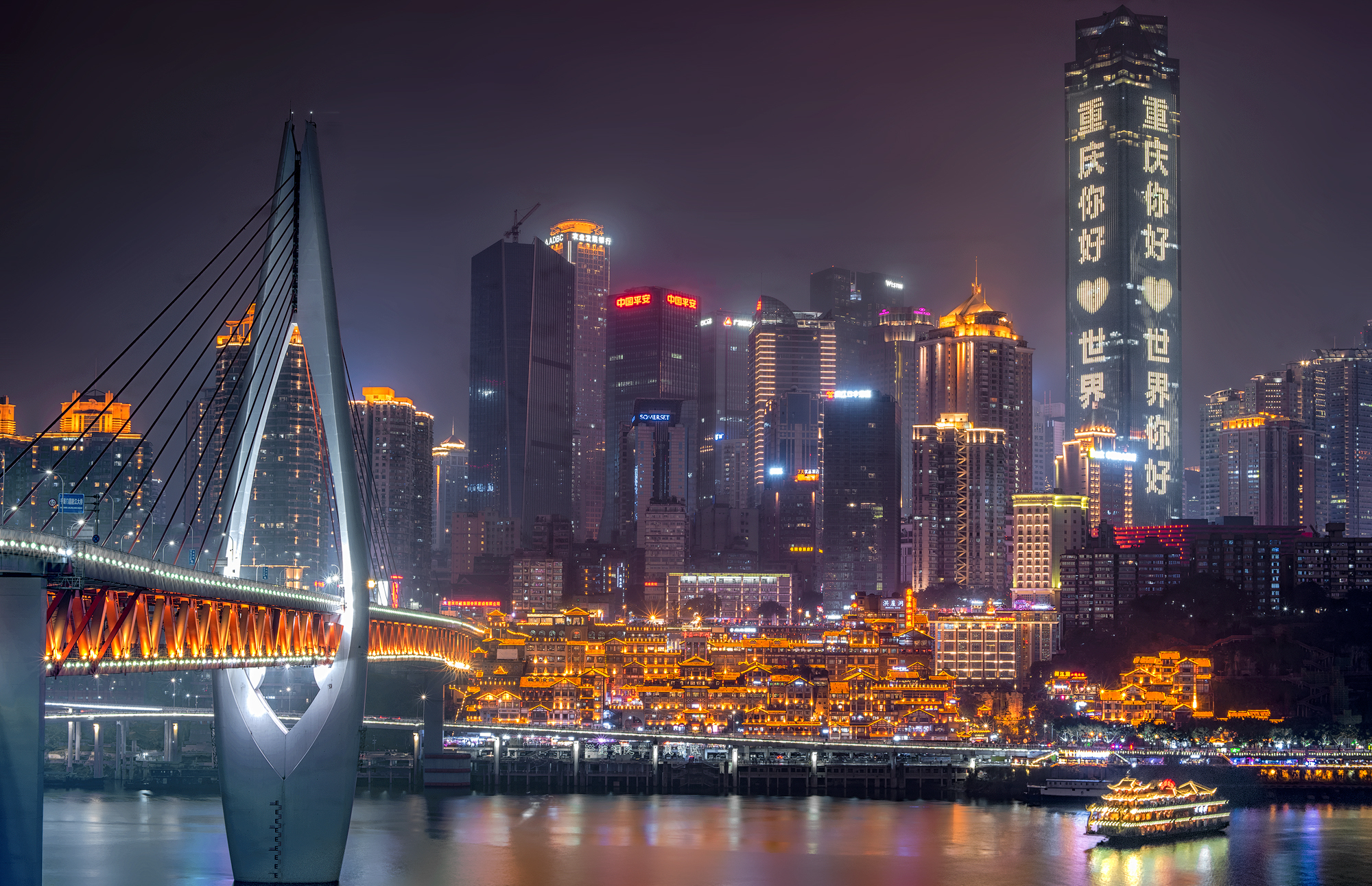
- Chongqing city
- Currency: Renminbi Chinese Yuan

Statistics
- GDP: 2.036 trillion (nominal; 2018 est.)
- GDP rank: 6th (2019)
- GDP growth: 6% (2018) 6.3% (2019)
- GDP per capita: $10,720 (nominal; 2019 est.)
- GDP by sector: Agriculture: 6.9% Industry: 44.1% Services:49% (2019)
- Unemployment: 2.96% (2018)
- Main industries: car manufacturing, electronics manufacturing, information technology, iron, steel, mining, export, Infrastructure building
- All values, unless otherwise stated, are in US dollars.

The economy of Chongqing, China, has developed rapidly since it was separated from the Sichuan and became a centrally-administered municipality in 1997. In 2019, it was the sixth-largest Chinese city economy and ranked as China's third-largest municipal economy. In China's overall layout, Chongqing is also important for connecting China's underdeveloped western region with its more advanced eastern region, as well as promoting the economy of the mid-lower reaches of Yangtze river and the central western region.

In 2011, Chongqing's gross domestic product exceeded 1 trillion Yuan (US$158.5 billion) and in 2018, Chongqing's gross domestic product was estimated to be 2.036 trillion Yuan (US$0.29 trillion). From 2002 to 2017, Chongqing maintained a two-digit GDP growth rate for over 15 years, with the peak growth rate of 17.1% reached in 2010. According to the World Bank, on a GDP per capita basis, Chongqing's GDP per capita was less than US$600 when Chongqing became a centrally-administered municipality in 1997. By 2019, it has grown to be 75,828 Yuan (US$10,720). According to the Ministry of Human Resources and Social Security, the registered unemployment rate in Chongqing was 2.96% by the end of 2018, with its lowest recording being 2.9% in 1997 and the highest being 4.120% in 2005.

Chongqing engaged in the process of upgrading its current economic structure following Chinese Communist Party general secretary Xi Jinping's nationwide economic reform announced in 2015. The goal for Chongqing specifically, and for other parts of China in general, is to balance out the city's excessive industrial output that is not met by the city's weak domestic consumption, which only accounted for approximately 50% of its GDP in the first three-quarters of 2019. Under this new structural reform, Chongqing has set up development zones to help with attracting foreign investors and the growth of more advanced Manufacturing industries, such as the electronics industry. Examples of these development zones include the Chongqing High Tech Industrial Development Zone, and the Xiyong Microelectronic Industrial Park. By 2017, the 41 municipal development zones and 5 state high-tech zones had been set up in Chongqing.

Chongqing also has established special business zones. For instance, the Jiangbeizui CBD is a large central business district is being constructed in the centre of the city of Chongqing, which was due to be completed in 2018. It aims to attract financial institutions to become a financial center in the future. New North Zone is also an economic administrative zone in north Chongqing, which covers a land area of 130 square kilometres (50 sq mi) and was established in 2002 to include Chongqing Economic and Technological Development Zone, Chongqing High-Tech Industrial Development Zone and Chongqing Export Processing Trade Zone.

== Economic history and development ==
In ancient China, the Chongqing-Sichuan basin initially possessed a self-sustaining agricultural economy, due to the surrounding natural barriers (e.g. the Qinling Mountains and the Ba Mountain) and weak transportation. This form of traditional economy was challenged by Sustainability issues, such as ecological degradation and climate change. After the construction of Shudao, a complex road system that overcame the natural barriers, Chongqing successfully connected with China's powerful Central Plains regime and initiated cultural and political communication. Chongqing was also finally able to promote the economy by using its extensive resources to trade with these dominant regimes.

Meanwhile, the core cities of China's western region were initially Xi'an before Sui and Tang dynasty, and Chengdu after Tang and Song dynasty. It is only after the Ming and Qing dynasty, during which the ports in the Yangtze river were put in use, did Chongqing become the regional economic and trade centre. Along with Sichuan, Chongqing used the Yangtze river as the golden waterway to connect China's inner west region with the coastal region in the east. Cities and city groups in the adjacent area, such as the Chengdu-Chongqing city group, Yunnan and Guizhou also acted as the vast hinterland for Chongqing. They provided material resources, labour and agricultural products after shipping in the Yangtze river was commenced, which enabled Chongqing to develop its economic and initiate the process of modernisation.

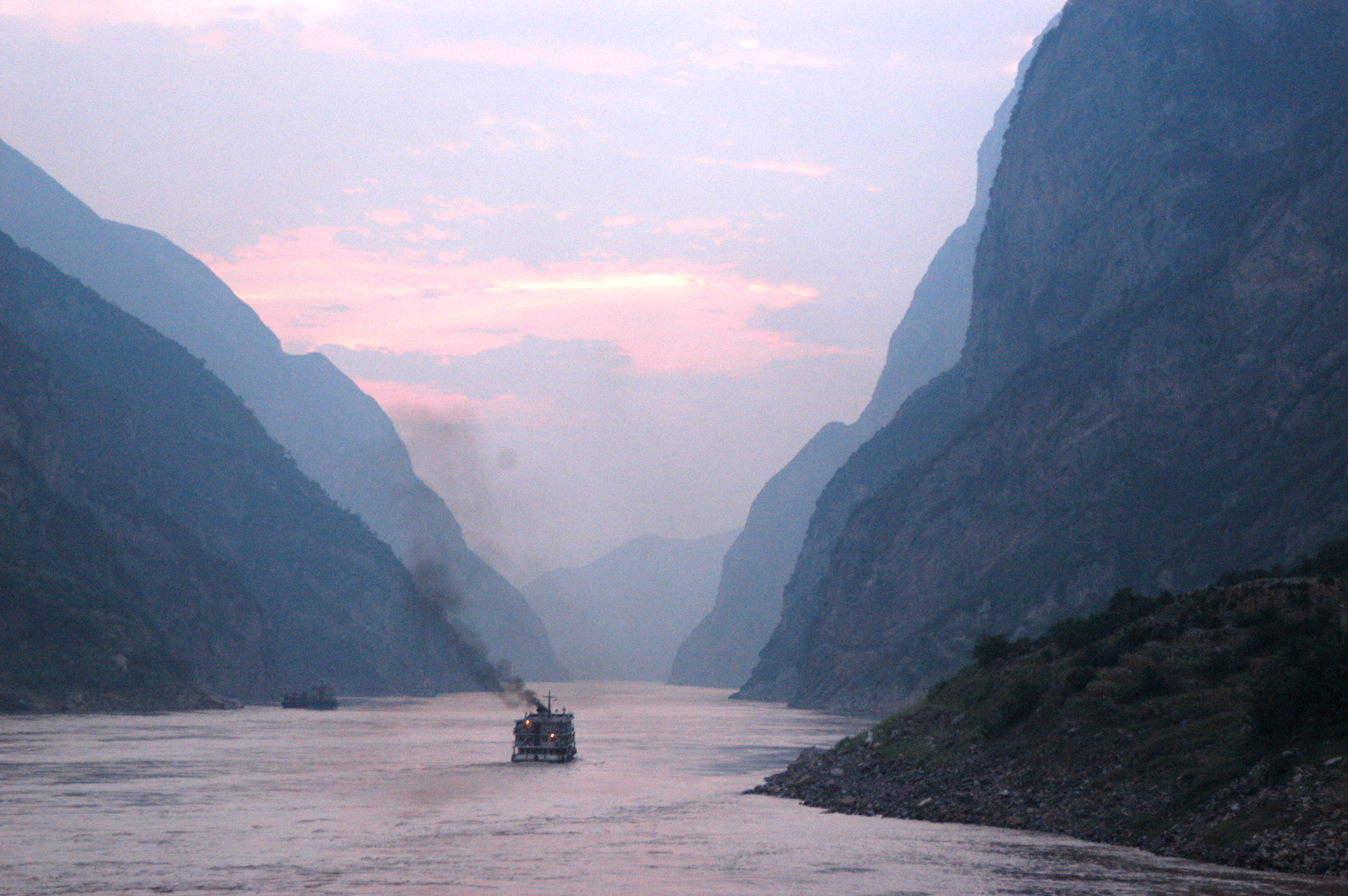
The Yangtze river

The modern development of Chongqing's economy has generally mirrored China's own development trajectory. Its industrial foundation was laid mostly between 1938 and 1945, when factories moved inland from the coastal regions. After the proclamation of the People's Republic of China in 1949, Chongqing undertook further industrial development due to extensive resources found in its vicinity, such as iron and coal.

Chongqing was a major recipient of China's investment in industrial capacity during the Third Front campaign. During the 1960s and the 1970s, it was used as an industrial base for military-related industries and the production of heavy mechanical equipment.

After China's reform and opening up in 1978, Chongqing received significant growth in foreign direct investment, which grew from an annual average of US$74 million between 1979 and 1996, to an annual average of US$267 million from 1996 to 2000 and an annual average of US$358 million from 2001 to 2005.

Since the 21st century, Chongqing has been included in several major economic development strategies. In its One Belt and One Road (OBOR) initiative, China aims to connect Asia economically with Europe, Oceania, and other countries in Eurasia through two major routes, the inland "Silk Road Economic Belt" and the overseas "Maritime Silk Road". Chongqing, as an inland city, is considered to be an important logistics centre in the initiative's overland route. Its role is to facilitate the creation of a corridor of trade and commerce between China, Africa and Europe. For example, the transcontinental Chongqing-Xinjiang-Europe International Railway joins Chongqing and Duisburg in Germany to provide low cost transportation for exports from China or cargoes from Europe. The government of Chongqing is also planning to strengthen and expand this transportation network to achieve broader coverage of nearby Asian cities, mainly those that can be reached in four hours of flight time, such as Singapore and Hong Kong. This new updated transportation network is called the Asia-Xinjiang-Europe transportation route, which would allow European shipments delivered by the Chongqing-Europe Railway to be efficiently distributed to other surrounding Asian cities. According to Li Muyuan, Secretary General of the Intermodal Transport Branch of China Communications and Transportation Association, the introduction of the Asia-Xinjiang-Europe route will allow Chongqing to connect the overland silk road economic belt with the Maritime Silk Road and achieve integration of the two separate trade routes.

Chongqing also benefits from the Chongqing model, which is a series of socio-political and economic policies introduced by the former party secretary Bo Xilai and mayor Huang Qifan. The Chongqing model's political aspects focused mainly on ideology campaigns promoting Maoism and the style of party leadership, while the economic aspects were concerned with urbanisation and attracting foreign direct investment (FDI) through low corporate tax rates and subsidies for foreign business, as well as investments in infrastructure. To achieve these goals, the government of Chongqing used means such as the distribution of over 3 million new Hukou status to migrant works from rural areas, which granted them education, social security and access to the urban health care system. It was also accompanied by large spending on the construction of cheap housing, which had aggregated to 15 billion Yuan by 2011, and land reforms.

Another major economic reform which impacted on Chongqing's economy was the Western Development Plan. Chongqing, Chengdu and Xi'an are the three main cities included in the West Triangle Economic Zone, a regional bloc created as part of the Western Development Plan to stimulate growth in China's less developed western regions. This development plan focused on several western geographical regions, including Chongqing and Chengdu in the upper Yangtze River Economic Belt. Its main contribution to Chongqing's economy was with regards to prioritising FDI and inducing large revenues increase in fixed asset investment, which grew more than seven times since 1999 to 2009 and from 2013 to 2015 the sum of Chongqing's overall investment on fixed assets aggregated to 4 billion Yuan. It was also these infrastructure investments that stabilised Chongqing's economy during the 2008 financial crisis, unlike China's coastal cities which suffered from plunging exports.

== Sectors of economy ==
=== Agriculture ===
According to the World Bank, Chongqing's primary economic sector made up approximately 22% of its total GDP in 1996 and approximately 8% in 2016. This decrease in the contribution of the primary sector to Chongqing's economy may be attributed to its growing rate of urbanisation, which increased from 30% in 1997 to 62% in 2016. This subsequently caused the lack of arable land. By the end of 2018, the total value of Chongqing's primary industry amounted to 137.827 billion Yuan and occupied approximately 6.8% of its total GDP.

=== Industry ===
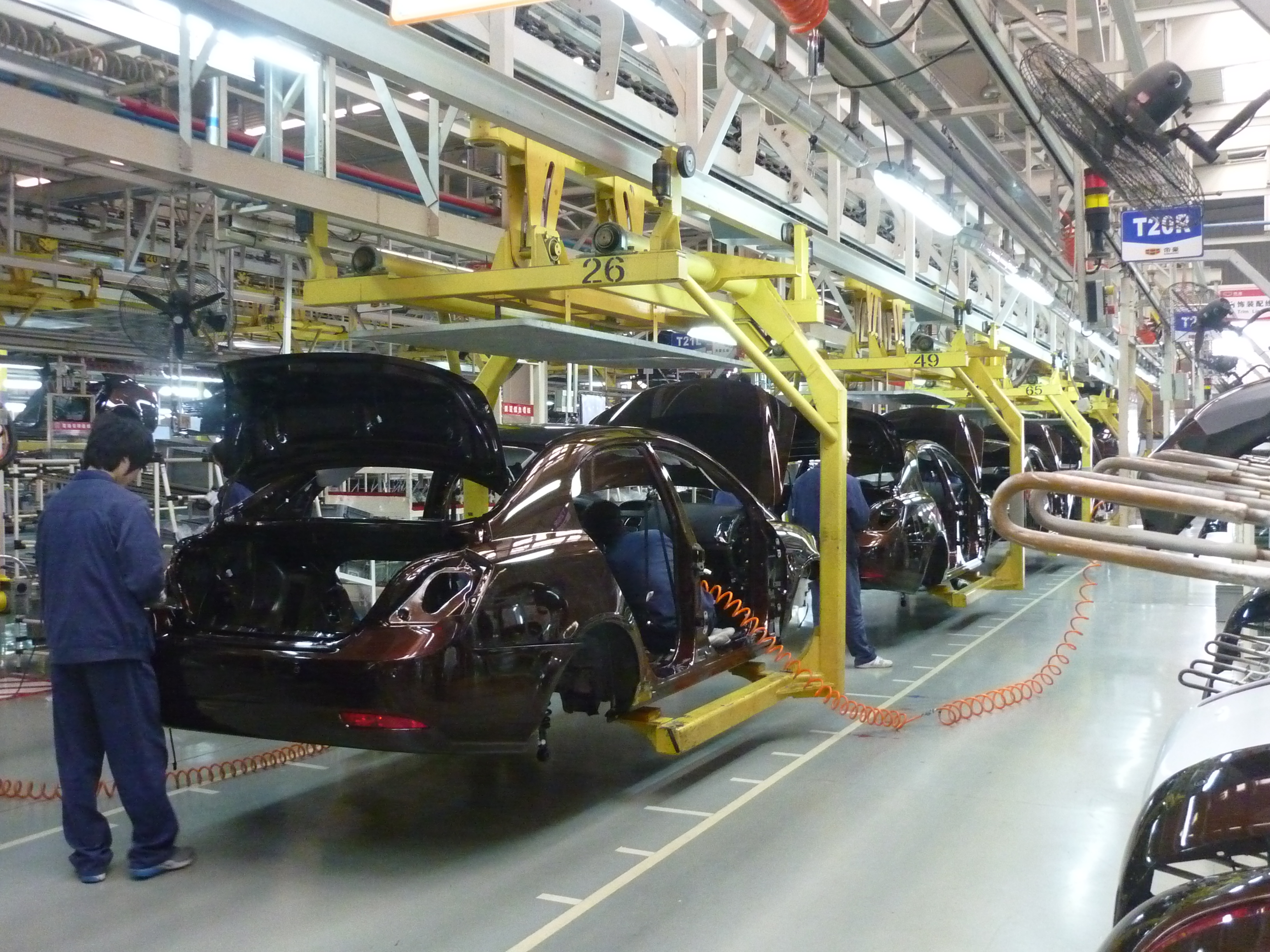
Automobile manufacturing

Chongqing's manufacturing industry has maintained similar weight in its overall GDP composition over the years. Its total value contributed to 43% of its total GDP in 1996, 46.3% in 2014 and approximately 44% in 2016, but the structure of this sector has changed dramatically. In the 20th century, it was dominated by heavy industries which demanded extensive resources, such as steel production and infrastructure building. While the percentage of GDP contributed by the manufacturing sector has remained relatively stable, the structure of this sector has indeed changed dramatically over the years. Chongqing has been transitioning from traditional industries to more modern and high-tech industries.

This has caused severe damage to its natural environment. Chongqing recorded the highest amount of acid rain in China during the 1990s, and less than 6% of the industrial waste was treated in the same period. By investing in incentive packages and employing cluster strategy, Chongqing successfully transitioned into the electronics and car manufacturing industries. It has become the biggest automobile manufacturing base in China, with total production exceeding three million cars in 2016. Chongqing also manufactured 58 million laptops in the same year, comprising one third of the world's total laptop production output, along with 280 million mobile phones.

=== Services ===
Chongqing's economy has experienced an increasing trend in the contribution of its tertiary industries, from composing 35% of its total GDP in 1996 to 48.3% in 2016 and 52.3%. in 2018. By the end of 2018, the total worth of Chongqing's services was 1,065.613 billion Yuan (US$150.32 billion), a slight increase from 956.403 billion Yuan (US$134.91 billion) in 2017. Following Chinese Communist Party general secretary Xi Jinping's supply side reform, Chongqing has given more support to its service industries to rebalance the economy from fixed asset investment-dominated development to consumption and services, by placing the focus on software information services and the digital economy industry.

== Economic reforms ==
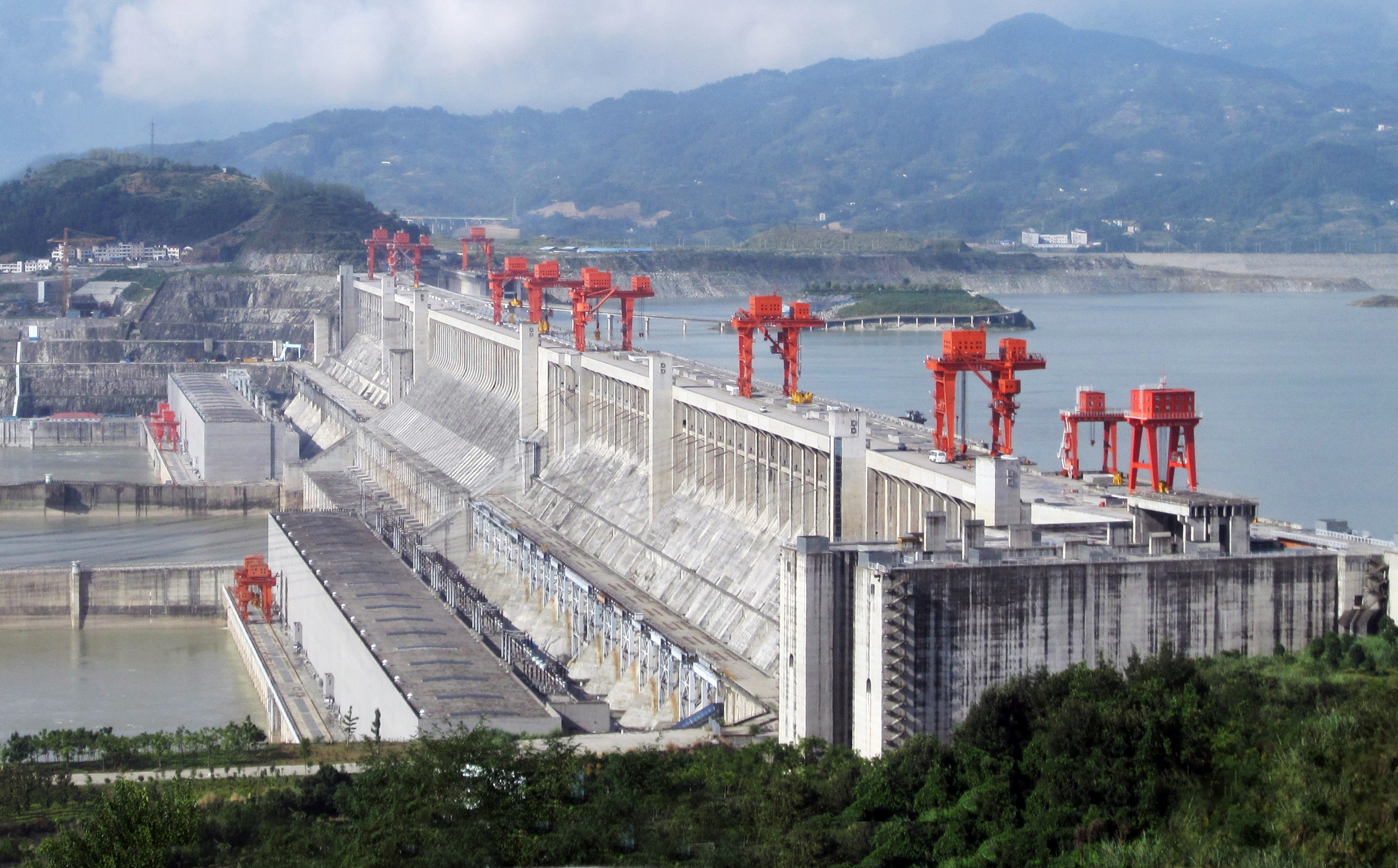
The Three Gorges Dam

In modern China, Chongqing has undertaken several major economic reforms. The first one was Chongqing's industrial restructuring which focused on the manufacturing industries, such as car manufacturing, following the Western Development Strategy. This was characterised by major state-led investments and the bankruptcy of state-owned enterprises in the heavy industries. In 2018, approximately 20% of Chongqing's industrial output was attributed to the manufacturing of cars. The rapid growth of its manufacturing industries is facilitated by Chongqing's geographical advantage of being located in the intersection of the Yangtze and Jialing River, which provides cost efficient waterway transportation for the export of manufactured goods to the global market. This was further aided by the completion of the Three Gorges Dam in 2008, the biggest hydropower station in the world, which has dramatically increased the river's shipping capacity and the dam's annual ship lock throughput reached 101 million tonnes in 2018

Another major economic reform for Chongqing is Paramount leader Xi Jinping's current "supply side structural reform", which aims to eliminate excessive productive capacity in the industrial sector and focus on domestic consumption and the services sector. For Chongqing, as a result of China's 4 trillion Yuan stimulus package in the 2008 financial crisis, Chongqing engaged in massive spending on infrastructure and largely expanded its industrial productive capacity. This is coupled with the massive state funding from the Western Development Strategy, resulting in fixed asset investment becoming the main driver of Chongqing's economy. By 2017, fixed assets investment had contributed to approximately 90% of its total GDP. This has hence caused doubts regarding the ecological and economic sustainability of this model of development. The onset of this industrial restructuring has also negatively impacted on Chongqing's economy. Starting from 2017, Chongqing's GDP development rate had been consistently falling, from initially 9.3% in 2017, to 6.6% in 2018 and 6.3% in 2019.

In response to the new reform, Chongqing has offered preferential policies, such as tax breaks and visa pathways, through various industrial zones to attract foreign investors and develop specific industries. These industries mainly include emerging manufacturing, such as the manufacturing of new materials, cloud computing, artificial intelligence, as well the electric cars industry. In total, the aggregated value of these emerging manufacturing industries increased by 13.1% in 2018. During the same period, the total value of the city's high-tech industries, predominantly the electronics and software development industries, grew by 13.7% year on year. This rapid increase in electronics manufacturing has incentivised a number of multinational corporations from the same industry, including IBM, Inventec and Hewlett-Packard to invest in Chongqing. According to a white paper by CCID Consulting, a top Chinese think tank, the Yangtze river region has become the number one cluster in China in terms of the advanced manufacturing industry. It has also produced 32% of China's top 500 companies in the advanced manufacturing industry.

With regards to the risks of investing in Chongqing, as noted by the southwest branch of the European Chamber of Commerce in China, Chongqing's business environment for foreign investment is largely limited by its poor rule of law, insufficient communication with government authorities and unpredictable policies. It was found in a survey by the European Chamber of Commerce that more than a third of foreign companies experienced poor enforcement of their contracts, such as delayed or uncompleted payments, by both state owned and private enterprises. These violations of business contracts are usually further encouraged by the lengthy Trial process in Chongqing, which would lead to private negotiations outside the court. It has been suggested by the chamber that, for Chongqing to transition into a true international metropolis, "Chongqing will need to take a multifaceted approach to resolving inefficiencies in the business environment". The World Bank has also pointed out that Chongqing will face other socioeconomic challenges during its economic reform and transitioning into a global city, including the fast depletion of Land reserve due to a rapid urbanisation rate, the balance between environment and economic progress and a downsizing labour force due to an ageing population.

== See also ==
- List of major power stations in Chongqing
- Politics of Chongqing
- Liangjiang New Area
- West Triangle Economic Zone
- Jiangbeizui CBD
- List of top Chinese cities by GDP
- List of top Chinese cities by GDP per capita
- List of Chinese provincial-level divisions by GDP
- List of Chinese provincial-level divisions by GDP per capita
- List of prefecture-level divisions of China by GDP
