= Western Taiwan Straits Economic Zone =

Proposed special economic zone in China

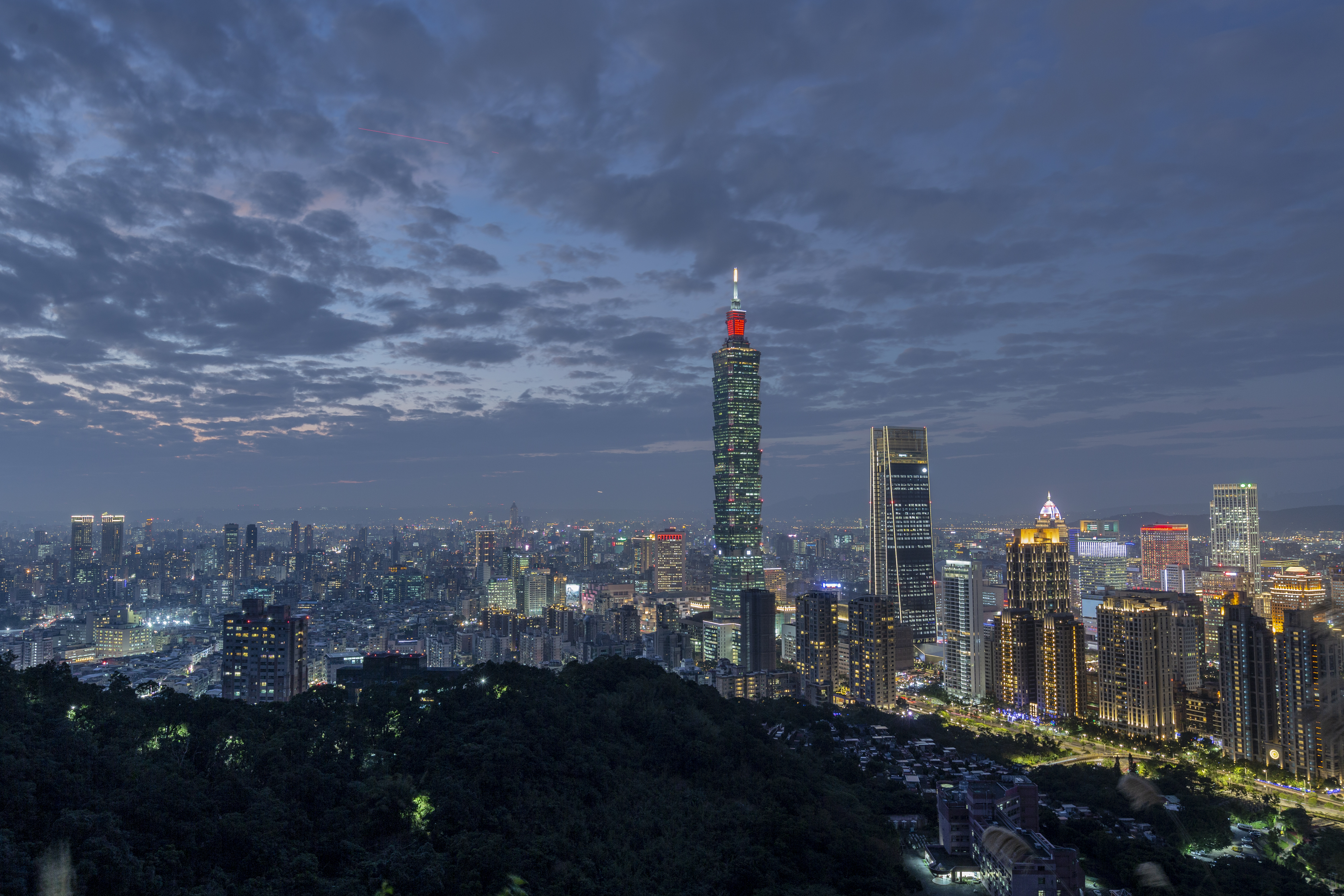
Taipei, Taiwan's capital city.

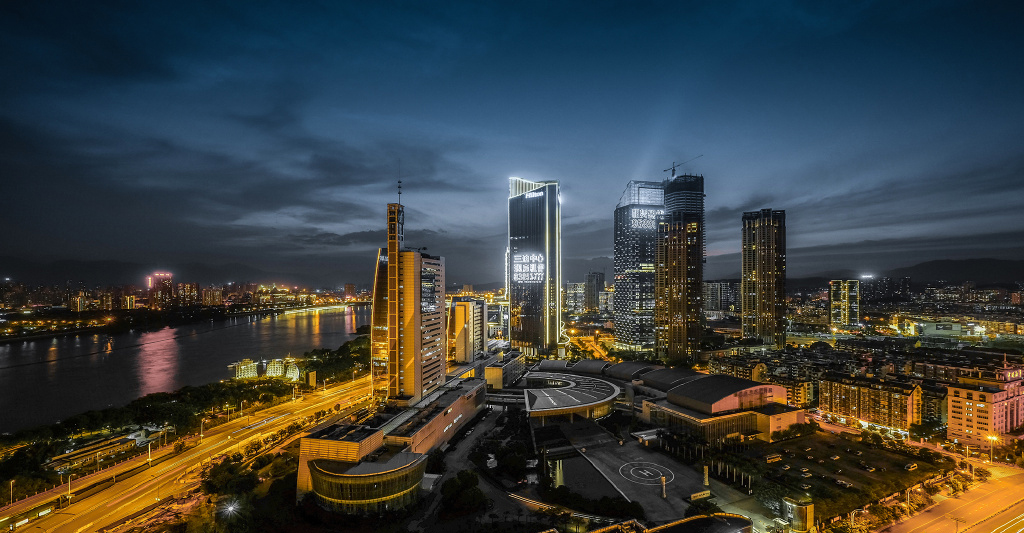
Fuzhou, Fujian's provincial capital city.

Western Taiwan Straits Economic Zone or West Coast Economic Zone (simplified Chinese: 海峡西岸经济区; traditional Chinese: 海峽西岸經濟區; pinyin: Hǎixiá Xī'àn Jīngjì Qū; Pe̍h-ōe-jī: hái-kiap sai-hōaⁿ keng-chè khu) is the proposed economic development zone for the economic region west of the Taiwan Straits by the Fujian government in 2004 and approved by the State Council of China on 4 May 2009. This include the coastal cities of Xiamen, Zhangzhou, Quanzhou and Fuzhou along Fujian province.

The proposed economic zone aims to integrate the economies, transport, infrastructure, policies from the coastal cities west of the Taiwan Straits for competitiveness, social development, increased and strengthened economic cooperation with Taiwan.

== History ==
The ideas of the economic zone has been around since 2001, when Fujian province was undergoing strong economic growth and the Fujian provincial government thought it needed to be competitive with other economic zones such as the Pearl River Delta and the Yangtze River Delta economic zones. The proposal was also supported by the central government in order to facilitate political and economic relationships across the Taiwan Straits.

The economic zone will help Fujian catch up to Taiwan's economic development. The economic zone would "promote the better use of resources of the economic belt in East China and enhance its overall economic strength," Wang Xiaojing, the then executive vice-governor of Fujian in 2005.

In 2008, mainland China through its Association for Relations Across the Taiwan Straits and Taiwan via Straits Exchange Foundation agreed on an Economic Pact which opened direct transport links for the first time since the end of the Chinese civil war. This allowed regular commercial flights, direct shipping between Taiwan and mainland Chinese ports and postal services.

== Economy ==
The proposed economic zone would accelerate economic development along the coastal cities in Fujian province. In 2003, Fujian's economy is China's 11th largest provincial economy with a gross domestic product (GDP) of 523.217 billion yuan (US$63.27 billion).

As of 2007, Fujian's current GDP is 924.9 billion RMB. The main economic engine in Fujian are Xiamen, Fuzhou, Quanzhou, Zhangzhou and Putian. The proposed economic zone will focus on electronic information, machinery building, petro-chemistry, construction material and clothes.

Taiwan's current GDP in 2007 was 388.1 billion US dollars.

In 2008, with the opening of direct transport links between Taiwan and mainland China. It is expected this would increase economic activity in the economic zone as well as for Taiwan. This will mean reduced cost for aviation, shipping, postal services. It will accelerate trade, social and economic development in the Taiwan Straits region.

Fujian already has around 5,249 Taiwanese projects in 2008. This is expected to increase as cross-straits bilateral ties improves. This will increase exports such as mechanical and electrical products, automatic data processing equipment, clothing and accessories and footwear etc.

Fujian's major export destination includes Hong Kong, United States and Japan. As economic trade with Taiwan increases with direct transport links, Taiwan will become a major export destination.

== See also ==
- Bohai Economic Rim
- Central Plains Straits Economic Zone
- Northeast Area Revitalization Plan
- China Western Development
- Rise of Central China Plan
- Economy of China
