= National central city =

Large city designated in China as important

- Simplified Chinese: 国家中心城市
- Traditional Chinese: 國家中心城市
Transcriptions
Standard Mandarin
- Hanyu Pinyin: Guójiā Zhōngxīn Chéngshì
- Bopomofo: ㄍㄨㄛˊ ㄐㄧㄚ ㄓㄨㄥ ㄒㄧㄣ ㄔㄥˊ ㄕˋ
- Wade–Giles: Kuo^{2}-chia^{1} Chung^{1}-hsin^{1} Chʻeng^{2}-shih^{4}
- Tongyong Pinyin: Guó-jia Jhong-sin Chéng-shìh
- IPA: [kwǒ.tɕjá ʈʂʊ́ŋ.ɕín ʈʂʰə̌ŋ.ʂɻ̩̂]
Yue: Cantonese
- Yale Romanization: Gwokgāa Jūngsām Sìhngsíh
- Jyutping: gwok3 gaa1 zung1 sam1 sing4 si5
- IPA: [kʷɔk̚˧ ka˥ tsʊŋ˥ sɐm˥ sɪŋ˩ si˩˧]

Location of national central cities of China

In China, a national central city (国家中心城市) is a municipality or city with regional, national, and international importance. There are nine national central cities: Beijing, Tianjin, Chongqing, Shanghai, Guangzhou, Chengdu, Wuhan, Xi'an, and Zhengzhou.

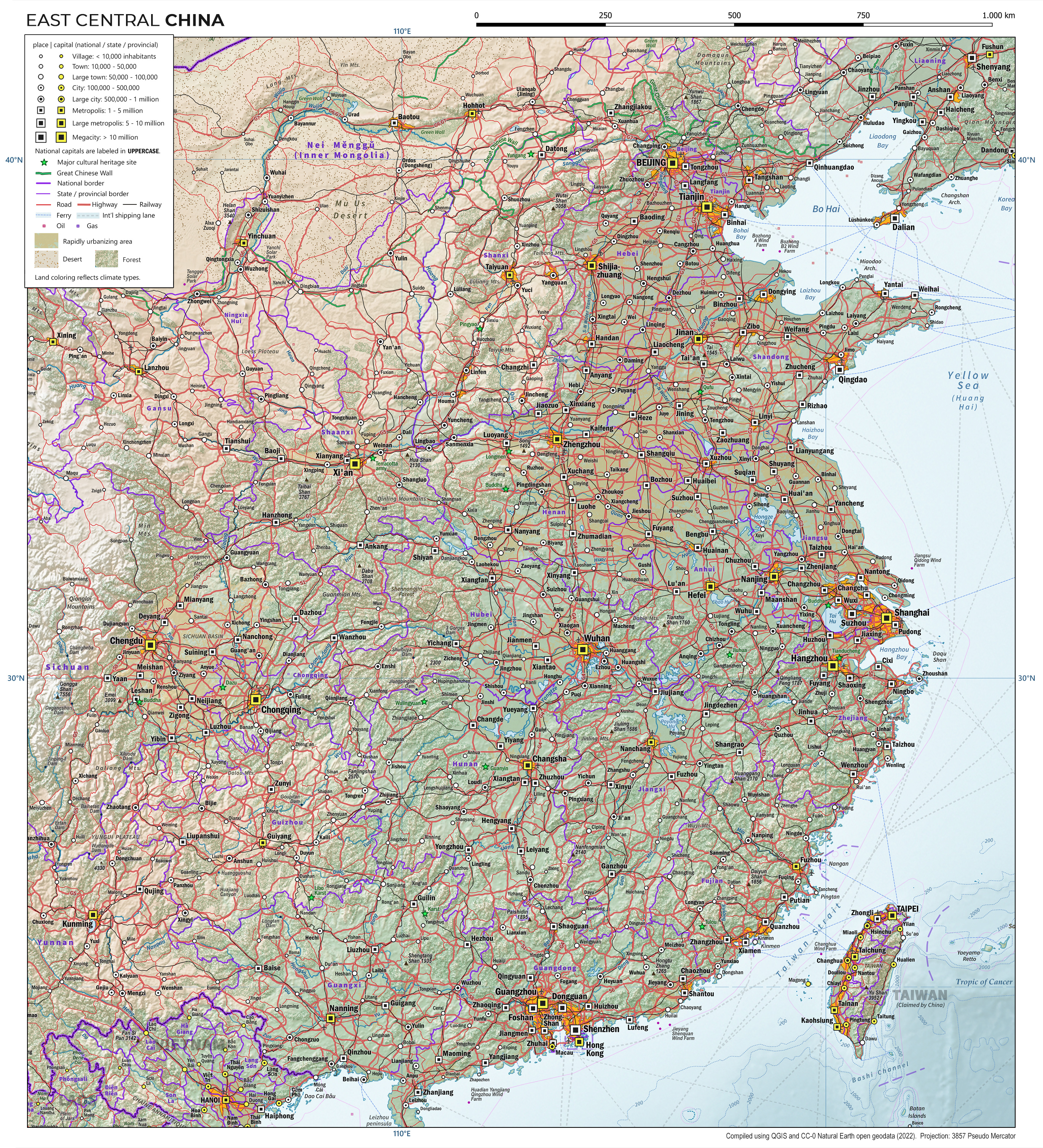
General topographic map of East Central China as per 2024, including the National Central Cities (Click to enlarge)

As defined by the National Development and Reform Committee, (Note: Chinese: 中华人民共和国国家发展和改革委员会) national central cities are strategically located in the country, shoulder the national mission, lead regional development, participate in international competition, and represent the national image. This designation was formulated by the Ministry of Housing and Urban-Rural Development in 2005 as a first step in reforming urbanization in China. The cities' hub activities or spheres of influence have great impact on their surrounding regions in modernizing and integrating services in various fields, including infrastructure, finance, public education, social welfare, sanitation, business licensing, and urban planning.

== List ==
Division	Native name	Total GDP (2017 USD)	Per capita (2017 USD)	Urban Population (2017)	Area (km^{2})	Density (/km^{2})	Municipal Population (2017)	Economic zone	Region	Subdivisions
Beijing	北京; Běijīng	$443.8 billion	$20,446.58	18.76 million	16,411	1,323	21.70 million	Bohai Economic Rim	North	List
Tianjin	天津; Tiānjīn	$294.7 billion	$19,452	12.91 million	11,920	1,306	15.57 million	Bohai Economic Rim	North	List
Shanghai	上海; Shànghǎi	$477.63 billion	$19,750.5	21.21 million	6,341	3,813.8	24.18 million	Yangtze River Delta Economic Zone	East	List
Chongqing	重庆; Chóngqìng	$309.1 billion	$9,433	19.71 million	82,400	373.2	30.75 million	West Triangle Economic Zone	Southwest	List
Chengdu	成都; Chéngdū	$273.8 billion	$16,515	11.54 million	14,378	650	9.14 million	West Triangle Economic Zone	Southwest	List
Xi'an	西安; Xī'ān	$118.4 billion	$12,055.41	5.9 million	10,135	893.6	9.06 million	West Triangle Economic Zone	Northwest	
Guangzhou	广州; Guǎngzhōu	$341 billion	$22,317	12.49 million	7,434	1,950.2	14.50 million	Pearl River Delta Economic Zone	South	List
Wuhan	武汉; Wǔhàn	$212.6 billion	$19,627.7	8.72 million	8,494	1,282	10.89 million	Yangtze River Midstream Economic Zone	Central	
Zhengzhou	郑州; Zhèngzhōu	$144.7 billion	$14,276.13	7.14 million	7,446	1,327	9.88 million	Zhongyuan Economic Zone	Central	

== Gallery ==
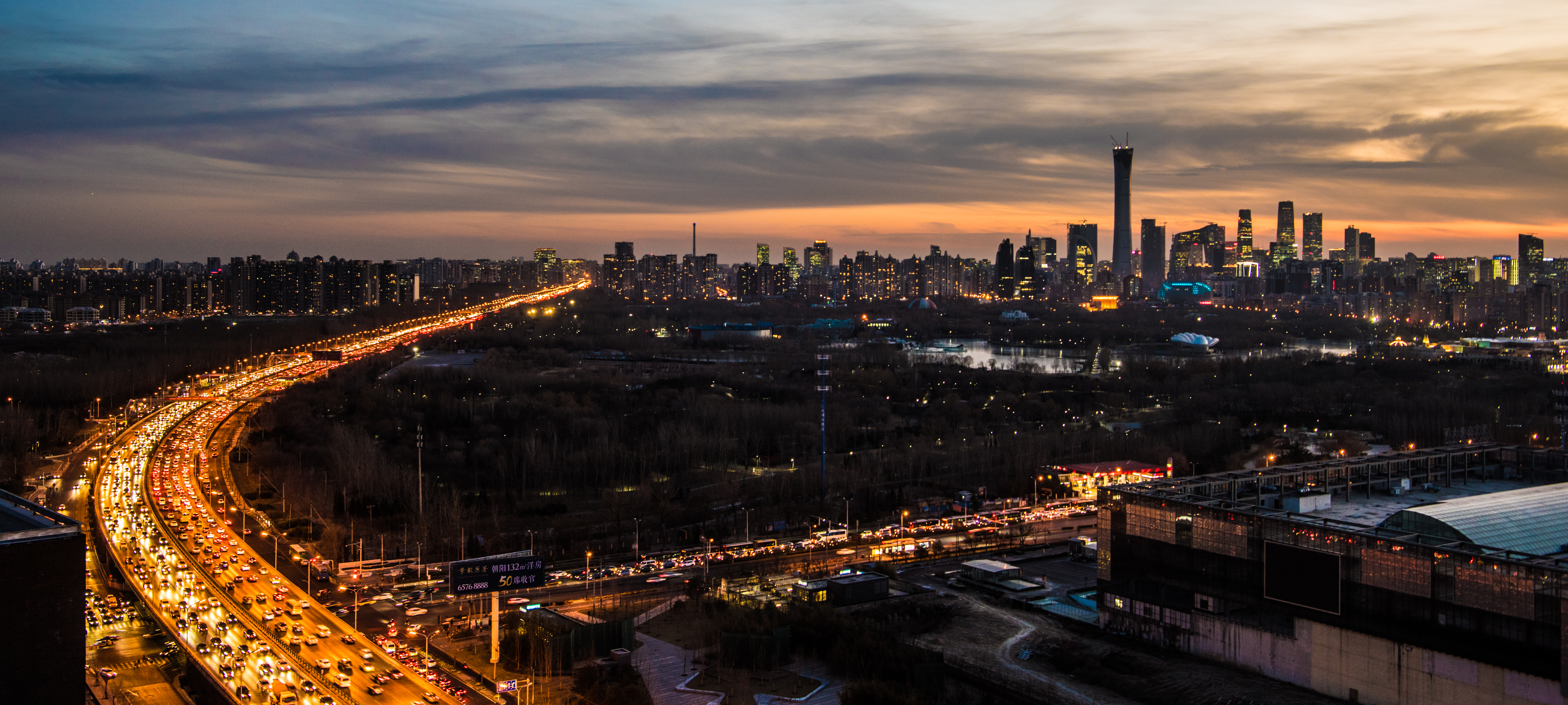
Beijing

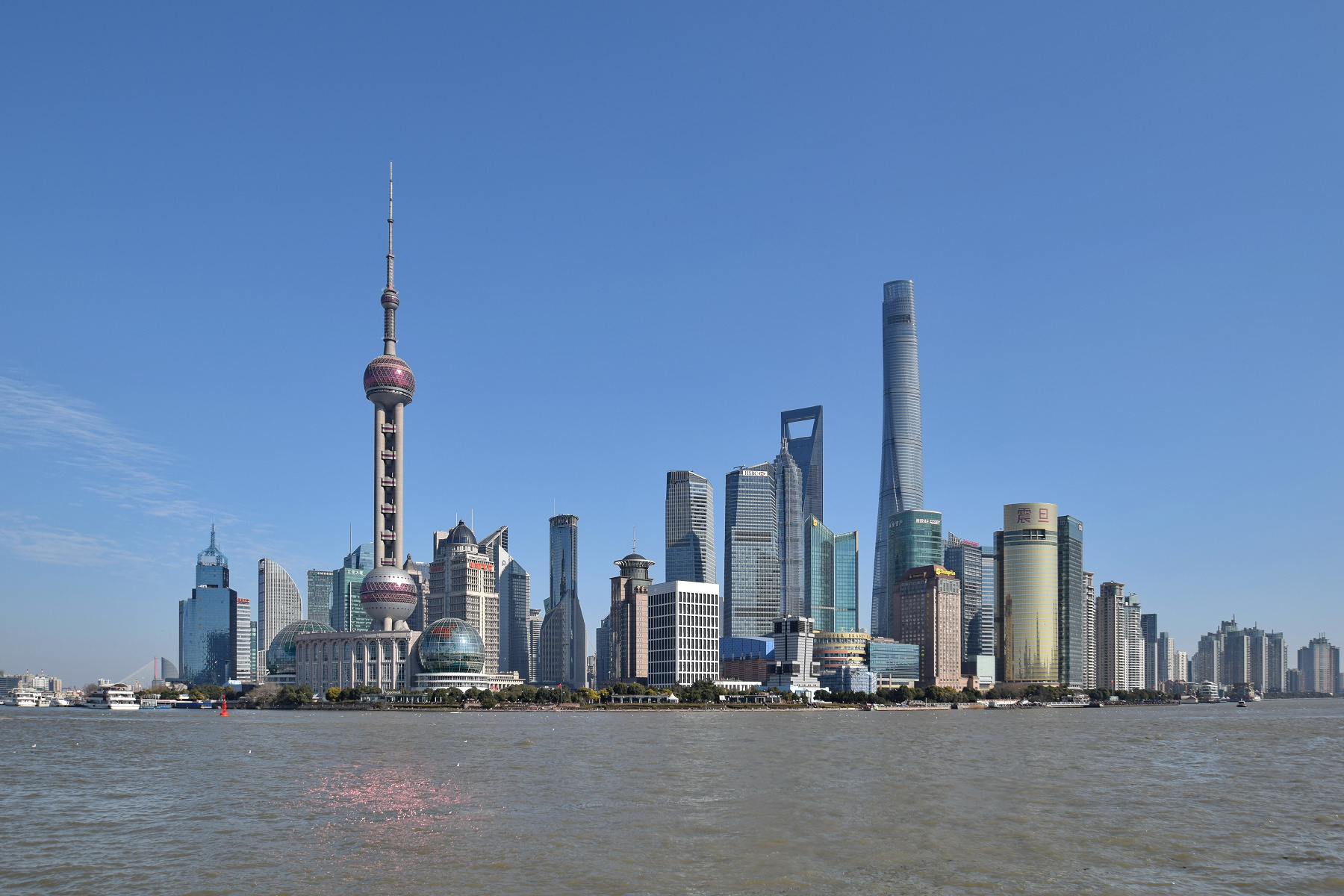
Shanghai

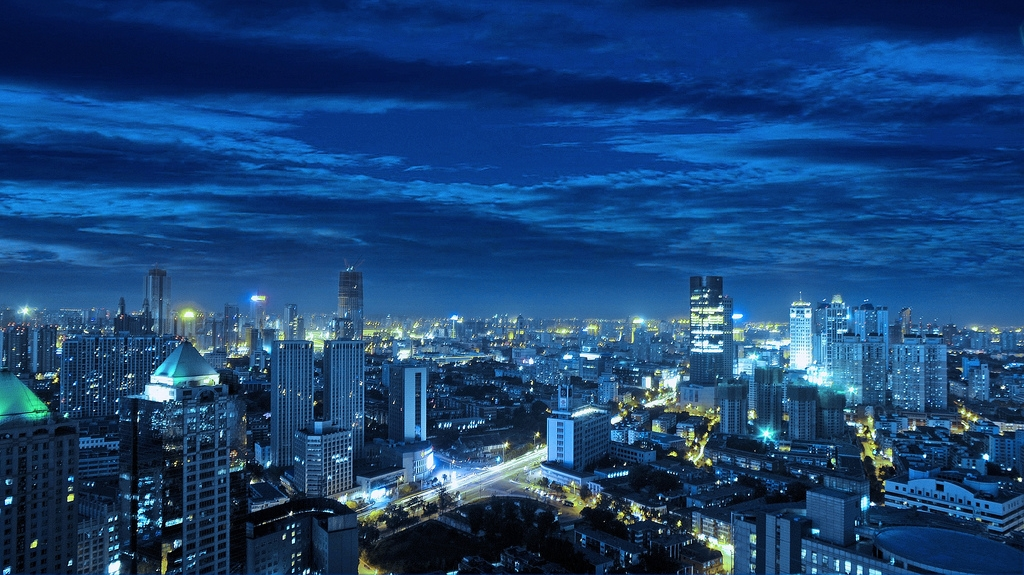
Tianjin

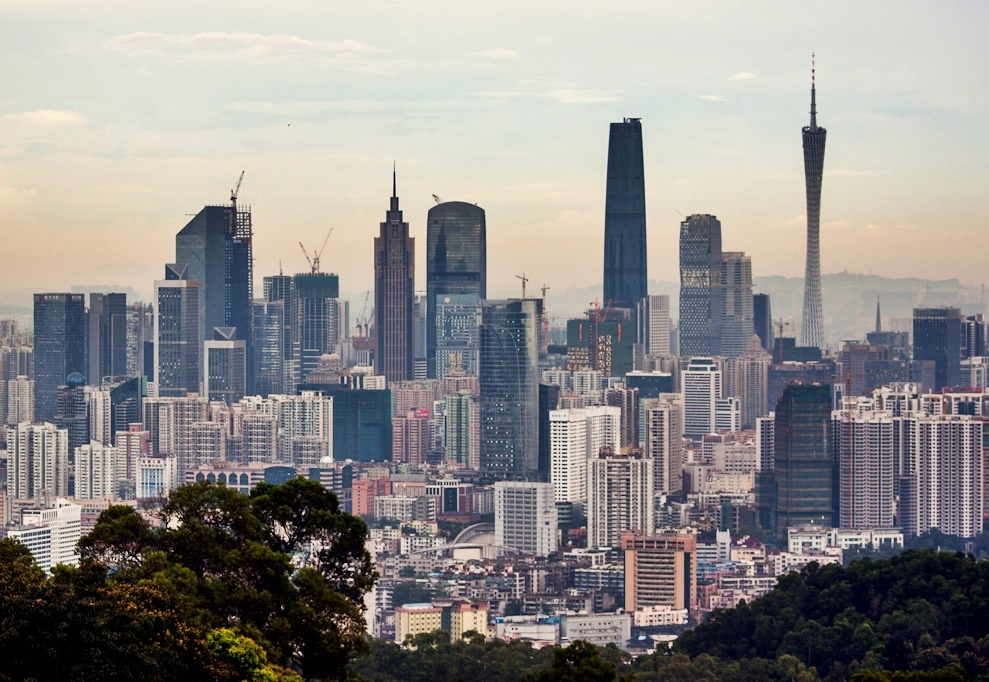
Guangzhou

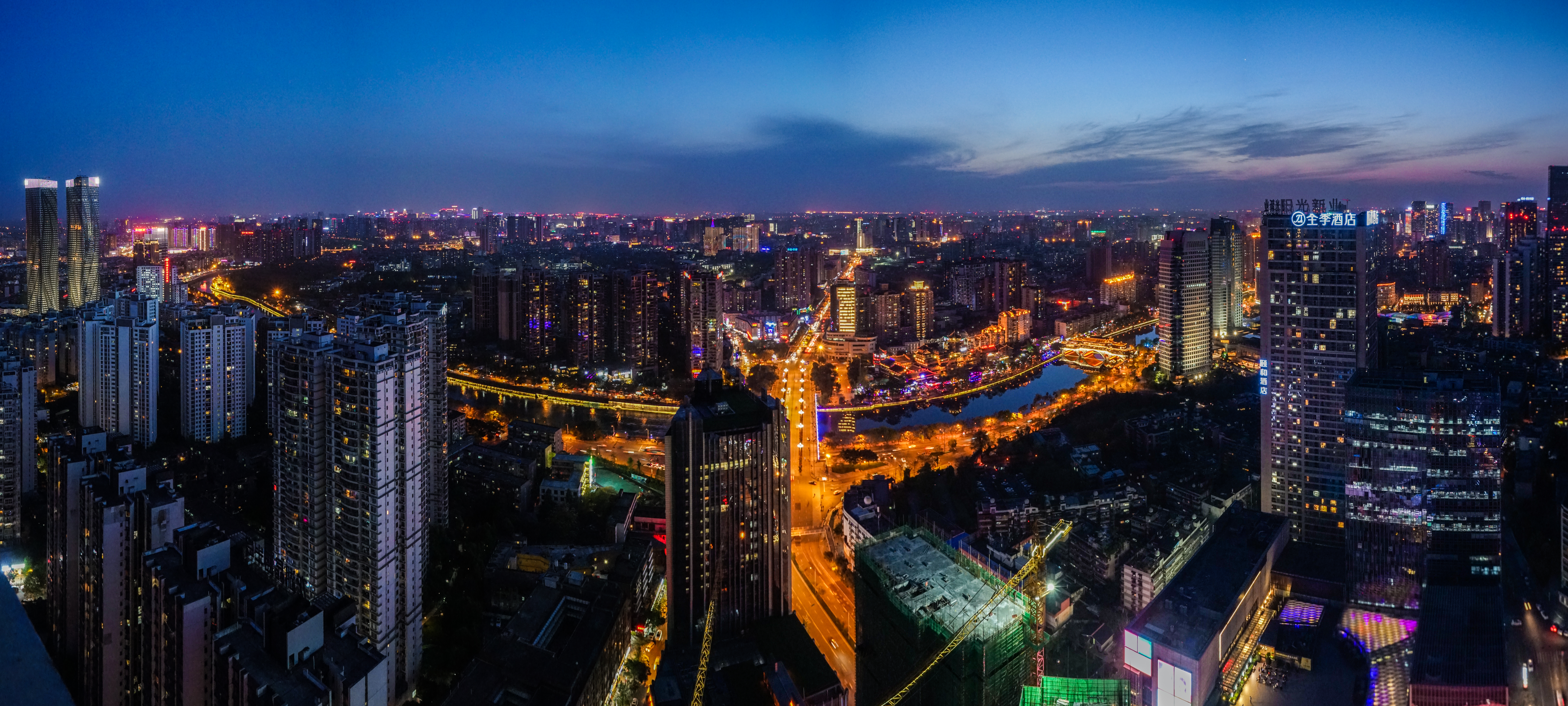
Chengdu

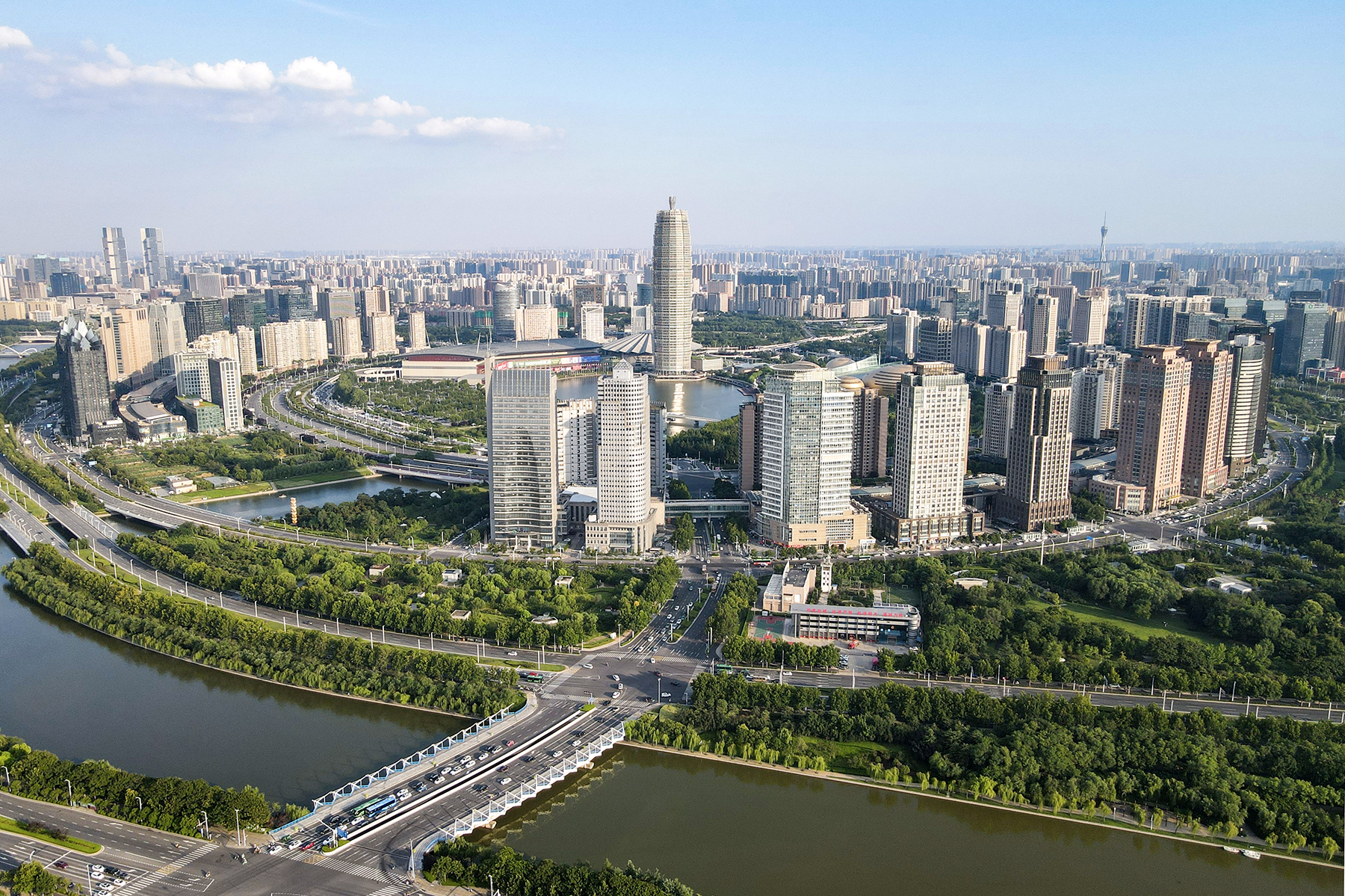
Zhengzhou

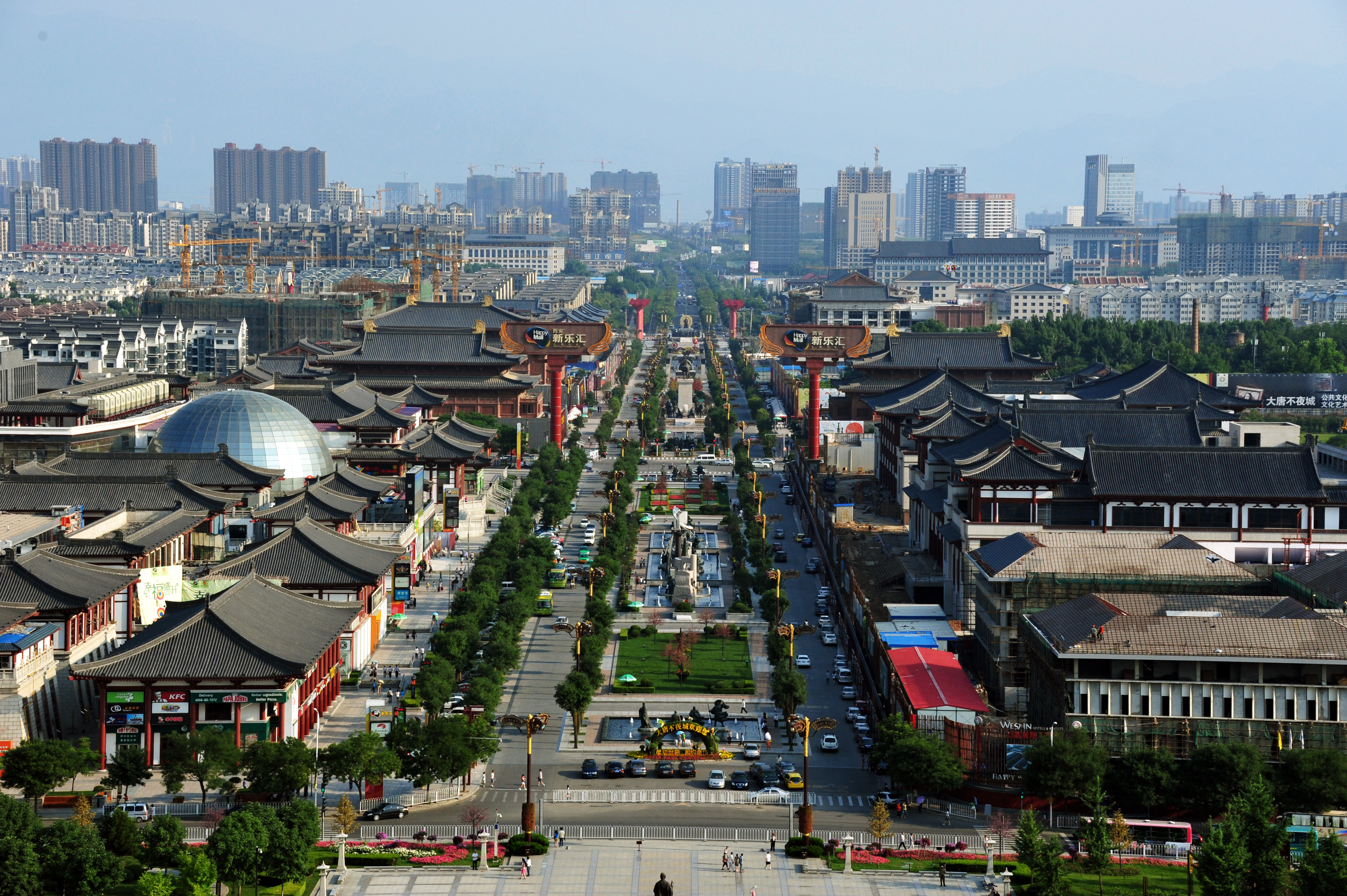
Xi'an

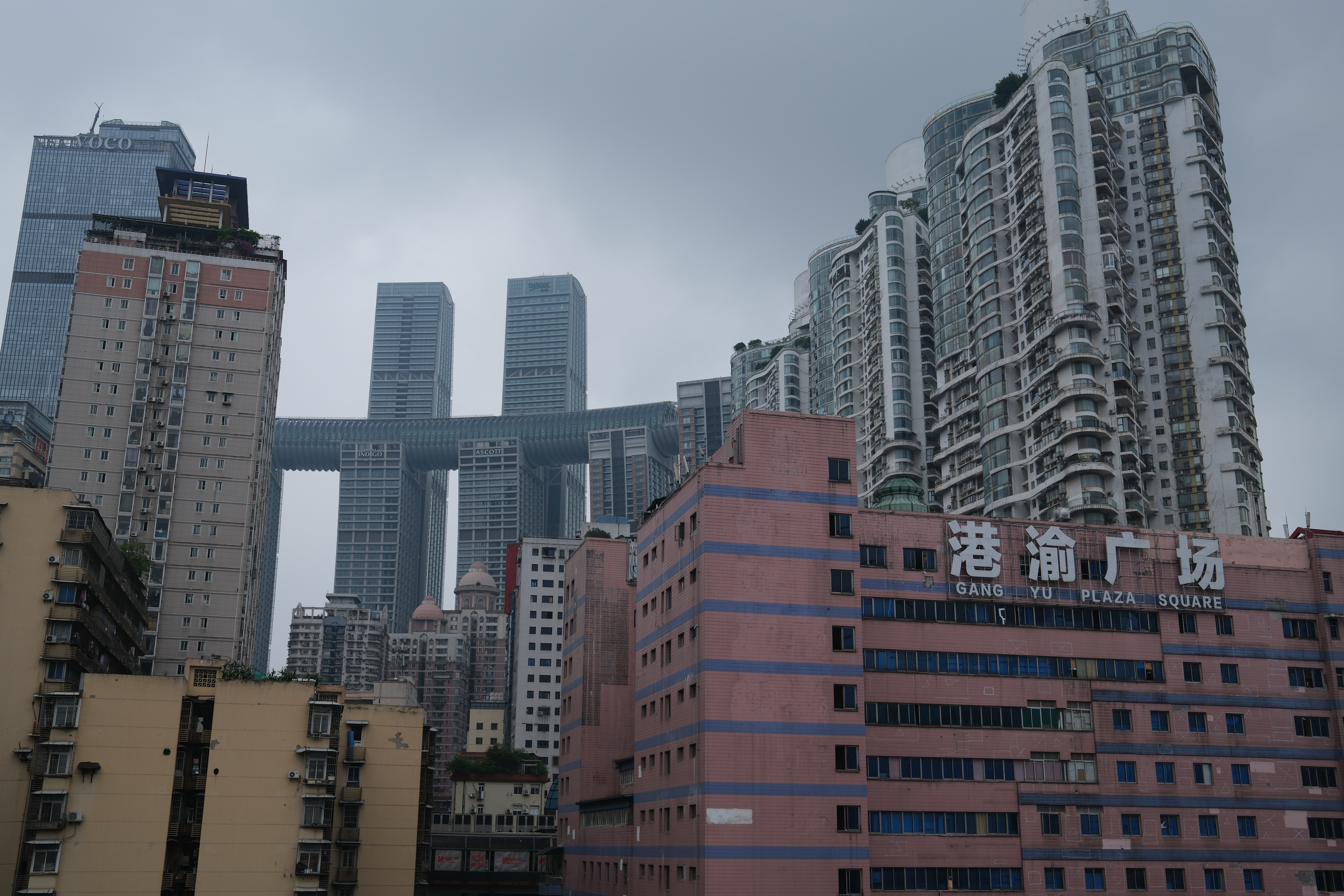
Chongqing

== See also ==
- Chinese city tier system
- List of top Chinese cities by GDP
- List of top Chinese cities by GDP per capita
- List of prefecture-level divisions of China by GDP
- List of cities in the People's Republic of China by urban population
- List of province-level capitals and sub-provincial cities in the People's Republic of China
