= Cross-Strait Economic Zone =

Proposed economic zone

Cross-Strait Economic Zone (simplified Chinese: 海峡经济区; traditional Chinese: 海峽經濟區; pinyin: hǎixiá jīngjì qū) is a proposed economic zone by the People's Republic of China which includes economic linkages between the three coastal provinces of mainland China and Taiwan. This includes coastal cities along Fujian, Guangdong, Zhejiang provinces such as Xiamen, Quanzhou, Fuzhou, Wenzhou and Shantou. In Taiwan, this would include Taipei, Taichung, Tainan and Kaohsiung. The proposed zone aims to increase economic ties between Taiwan and mainland China.

The ROC positions this Cross-Strait Economic Zone as an implementation of the proposed Economic Cooperation Framework Agreement (EFCA) between Taiwan and mainland China.

== History ==
This proposed zone also covers the Western Taiwan Straits Economic Zone which is the coastal economic zone located in Fujian province. The proposed economic zone was raised in the 2009 Second Session of the 11th National Committee of the Chinese People's Political Consultative Conference.

If implemented, the zone would cover the southern part of Zhejiang Province, eastern Guangdong, central and eastern Jiangxi, the entire Fujian Province, and Taiwan.

The rationale for the economic zone is to increase economic activity between the coastal cities of mainland China and Taiwan. The PRC Ministry of Commerce reported the trade volume between mainland China and Taiwan in the first 11 months of 2008 reached 122 billion U.S. dollars, an 8.4 percent increase from the previous year.
