= China Western Development =

Chinese economic policy

Eastern China
"Rise of Central China"
"Revitalize Northeast China"
"China Western Development"

China Western Development (西部大开发) (Note: also rendered in English as the Great Western Development program, the Great Western Development Strategy, or the Open Up the West Program) is an economic policy applied in Western China as part of the effort to reduce imbalances in development between China's coastal regions and its interior.

The policy covers six provinces (Gansu, Guizhou, Qinghai, Shaanxi, Sichuan and Yunnan), five autonomous regions (Guangxi, Inner Mongolia, Ningxia, Tibet and Xinjiang), and one municipality (Chongqing). Despite making up 71.4% of mainland China, this region holds only 28.8% of its population (as of 2002) and 19.9% of its total economic output (as of 2015).

== History ==
In 1978, under the leadership of Deng Xiaoping, the People's Republic of China began the reform and opening up by changing from a command economy to a market economy. The coastal regions of eastern China benefited greatly from these reforms, and their economies rapidly grew. In contrast, regions in the western half of China lagged behind economically. In 1988, Deng described the strategic concept of "two overall situations," stating that while coastal areas should speed their economic development, once they reached a sufficient level of development, they should help the interior regions develop.

Jiang Zemin sought to address the regional imbalances, holding the belief that underdevelopment made the western region at risk for social discontent and foreign interference. In March 1999, he proposed a developmental strategy for the western region at the 9th National People's Congress. He would elaborate on the plan in June 1999, during which the phrase great western development was used, marking the start of the policy. In a development symposium in Xi'an that month, Jiang stated that increasing development in the western and central regions of China was a matter of political and social significance, as well as economic significance.

Premier Zhu Rongji visited the western region to gather the view of officials from Western China on the plan. Consequently, the State Planning Commission drafted an early plan for the proposal before submitting it to the Politburo Standing Committee of the Chinese Communist Party in November 1999. A Leadership Group for Western China Development (西部地区开发领导小组) was created by the State Council in January 2000, led by Zhu. The plan for western development was formally put forward during the fifth plenary session of the 15th Central Committee of the Chinese Communist Party.

For these purposes, the western region is defined as Sichuan, Gansu, Guizhou, Yunnan, Qinghai, Shaanxi, the municipality of Chongqing, Ningxia, Xinjiang, Inner Mongolia, Guangxi and Tibet.

=== Timeline of events ===
- 1999: the Western Development guidelines are clarified
- 2000: the Western Development plan begins
- 2001: the official website of the Western Development program is launched
- 2002: construction of the West-East Gas Pipeline begins
- 2003: the policy of "Returning Grazing Land to Grassland" comes into effect
- 2004: the Law on Promoting Western Development is listed on the legislative plan of the 10th National People's Congress
- 2005: compulsory education tuition and fees become exempt in western areas
- 2006: the Qinghai-Tibet railway begins operation
- 2007: the Ministry of Finance invests 280 billion yuan in the west to support key projects
- 2009: Formation of the West Triangle Economic Zone

== Strategy ==
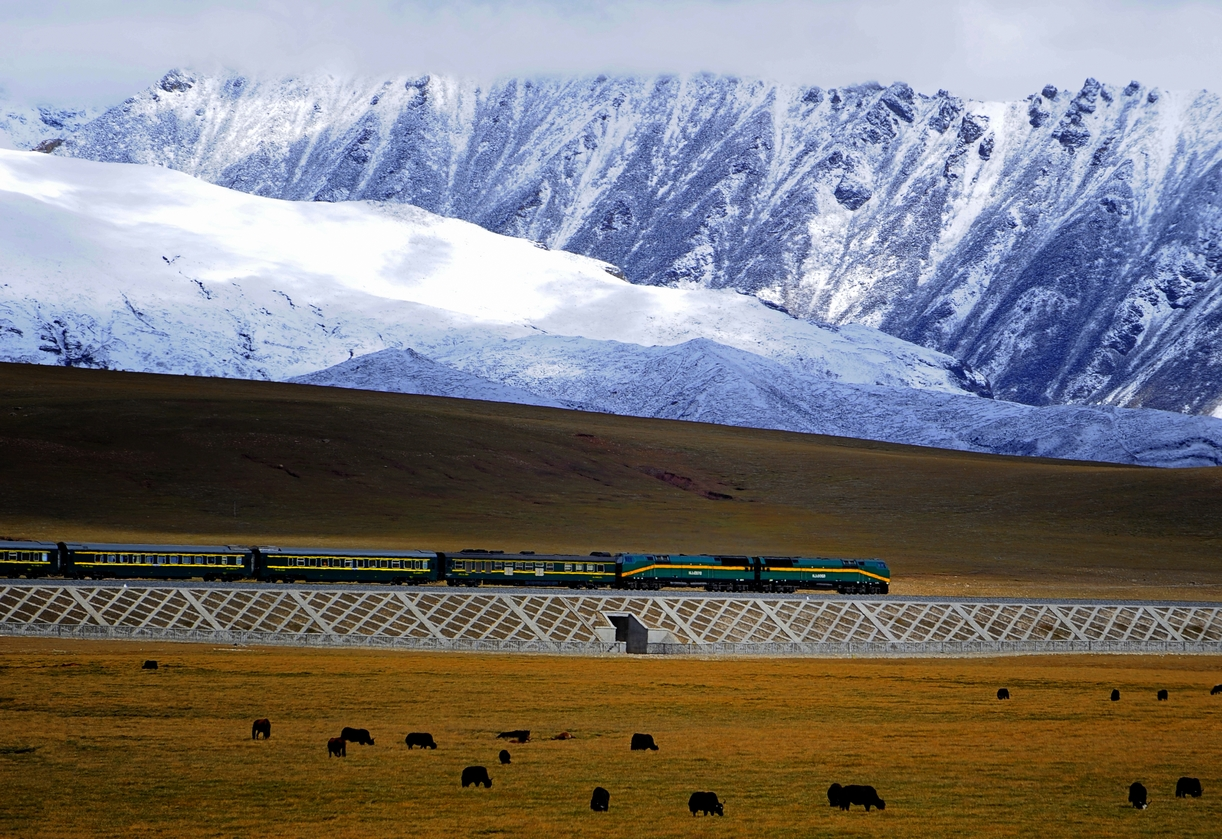
Qinghai–Tibet railway

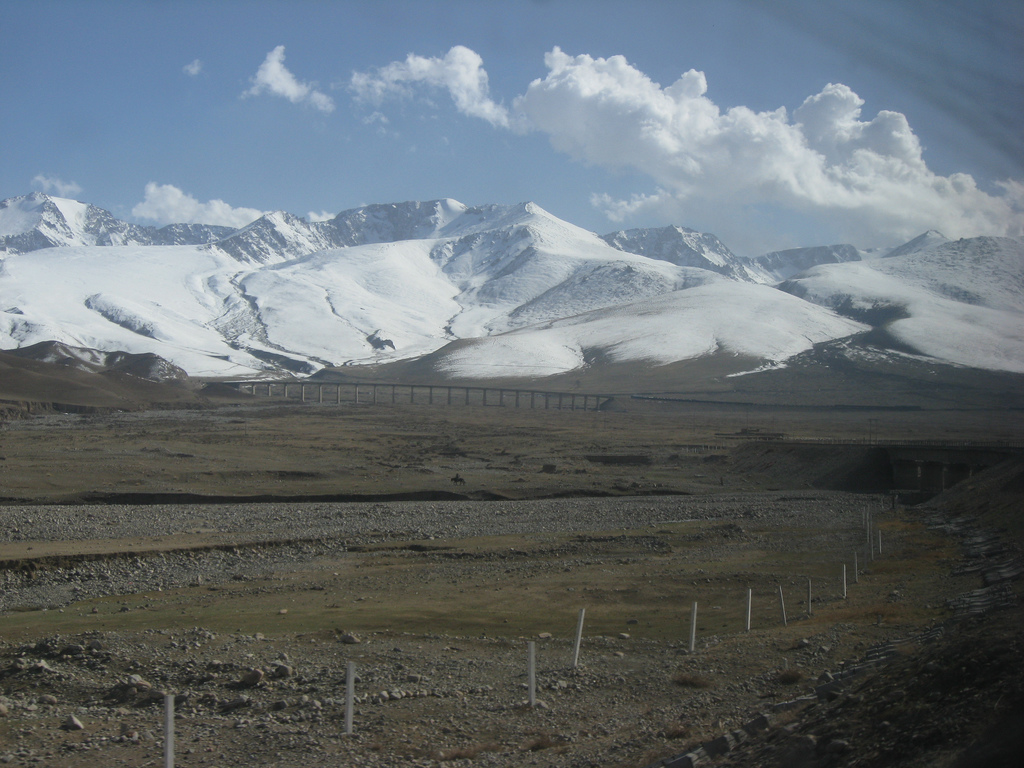
Southern Xinjiang railway

The main components of the strategy include the development of infrastructure (transport, hydropower plants, energy, and telecommunications), enticement of foreign investment, increased efforts on ecological protection (such as reforestation), promotion of education, and retention of talent flowing to richer provinces.

In the first decade of the policy, China allocated more than USD 100 billion to fund infrastructure development projects in the west, including regional highways, telecommunications, agricultural expansion, and energy-related infrastructure.

=== Energy ===
One of the major energy projects of was the West-East Gas Pipeline, which connected China's east to western gas reserves and facilitated access to gas from Central Asia.

=== Transportation ===
The western development bureau affiliated to the State Council released a list of 10 major projects to launch in 2008, with a combined budget of 436 billion yuan (64.12 billion U.S. dollars).

These projects included new railway lines connecting Guiyang and Guangzhou, Lanzhou and Chongqing, Kashgar and Hotan in Xinjiang; highways between Wanyuan and Dazhou in Sichuan Province, Shuikou and Duyun in Guizhou Province; airport expansion projects in Chengdu, Chongqing and Xi'an.

They also include the building of hydropower stations, coal mines, gas and oil transmission tube lines as well as public utilities projects in western regions.

The Qinghai-Tibet railway project set a milestone in Tibet's local development, connecting Tibet with central China. Prior to its completion, Tibet could not be reached by railway.

=== Hydraulic projects ===
The Big Western Line is a proposal for diverting water from the upstream sections of six rivers in southwestern China to the dry areas of northern China through a system of reservoirs, tunnels and natural rivers. Some of the southwestern rivers include the Mekong, the Yarlung Tsangpo and the Salween. The Big Western Line is a possible element of the South–North Water Transfer Project. The project was one of the most controversial proposals as of 2006.

=== Hydropower ===
As part of the program, China's five large state-owned hydropower companies planned, underwrote, and built the majority of dams on the Lancang River and its tributaries.

=== Taxation ===
Foreign-invested enterprises in the west region operating in specified industries received a preferential corporate income tax rate of 15% as well as 50% for three years after graduating from the basic tax holiday. Foreign enterprises in transportation, electricity, water conservancy, mail services, and broadcasting had a full tax exemption for 2 years and 50% tax relief for an additional three years afterwards.

== Effects ==
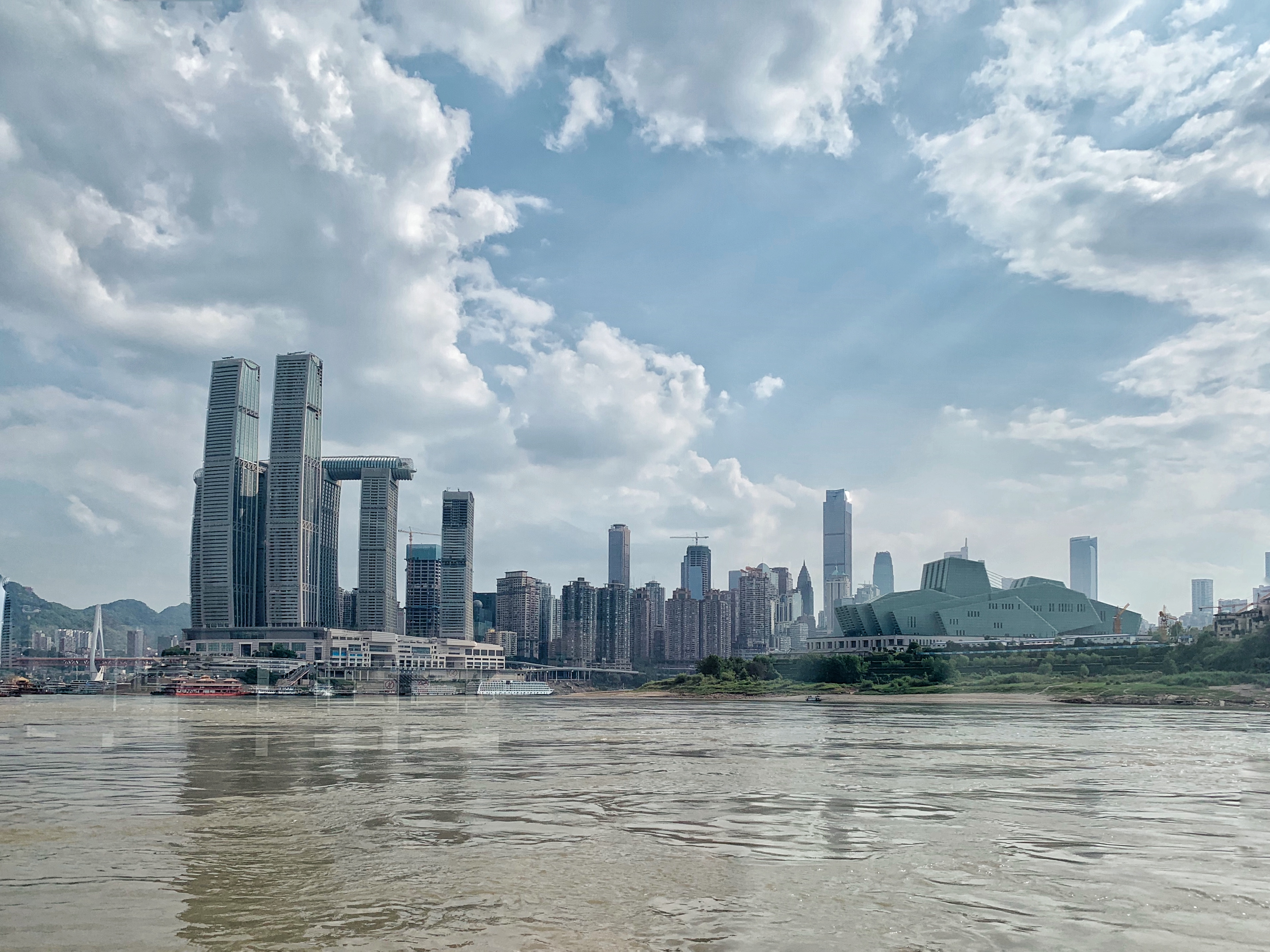
Central Chongqing, one of the nine national central cities

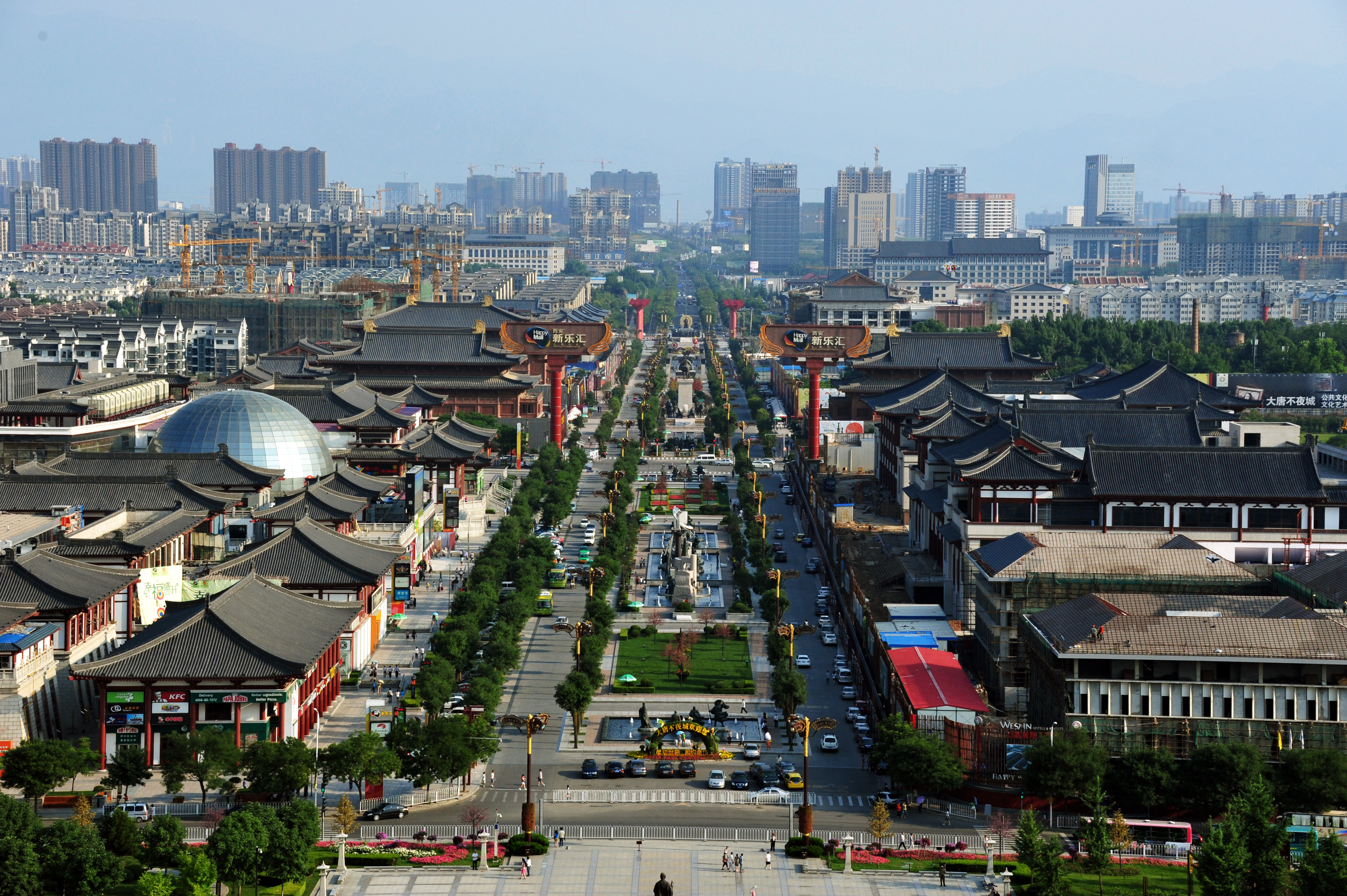
Xi'an, capital of Shaanxi province

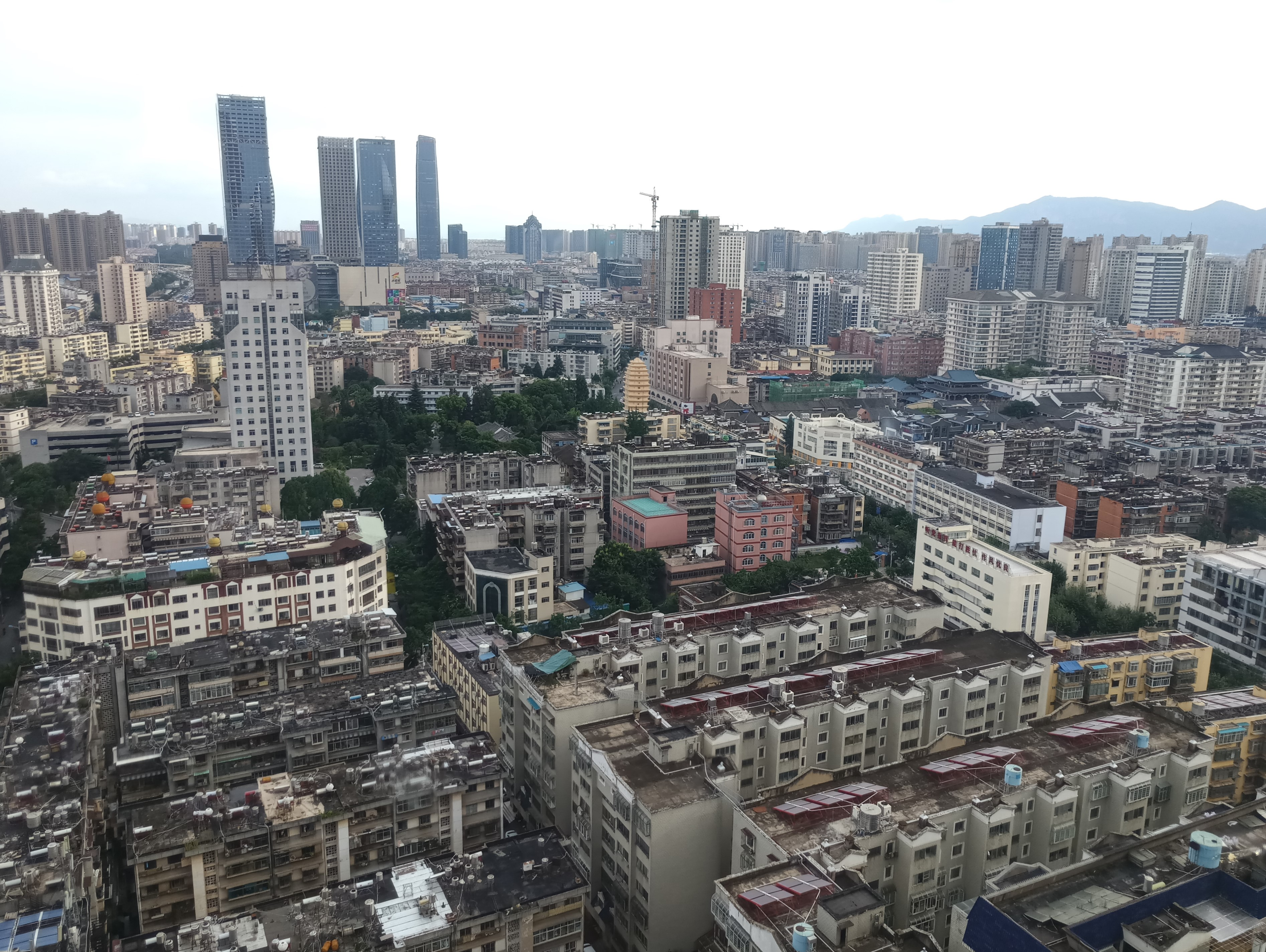
Kunming, capital of Yunnan province

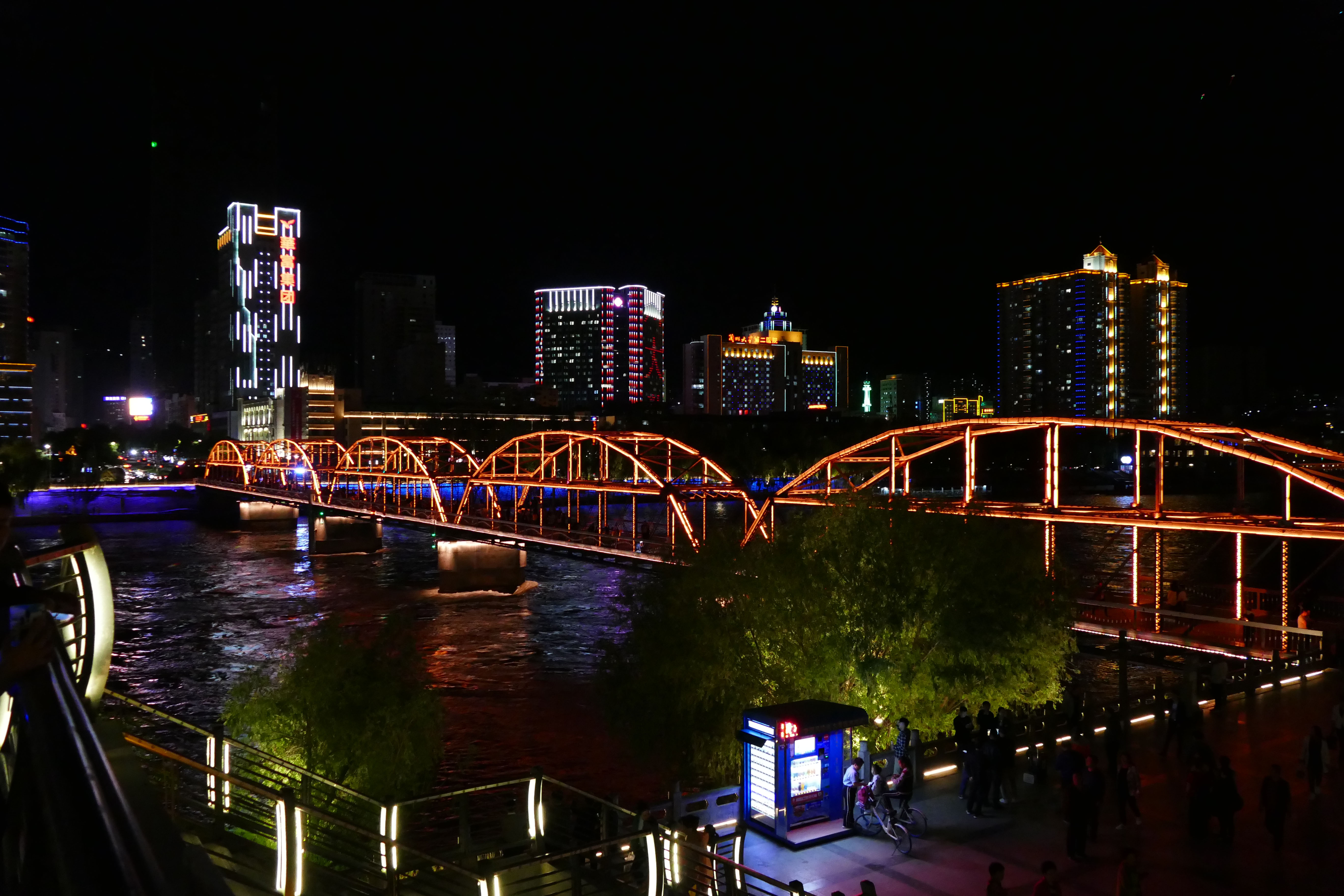
Lanzhou, capital of Gansu province

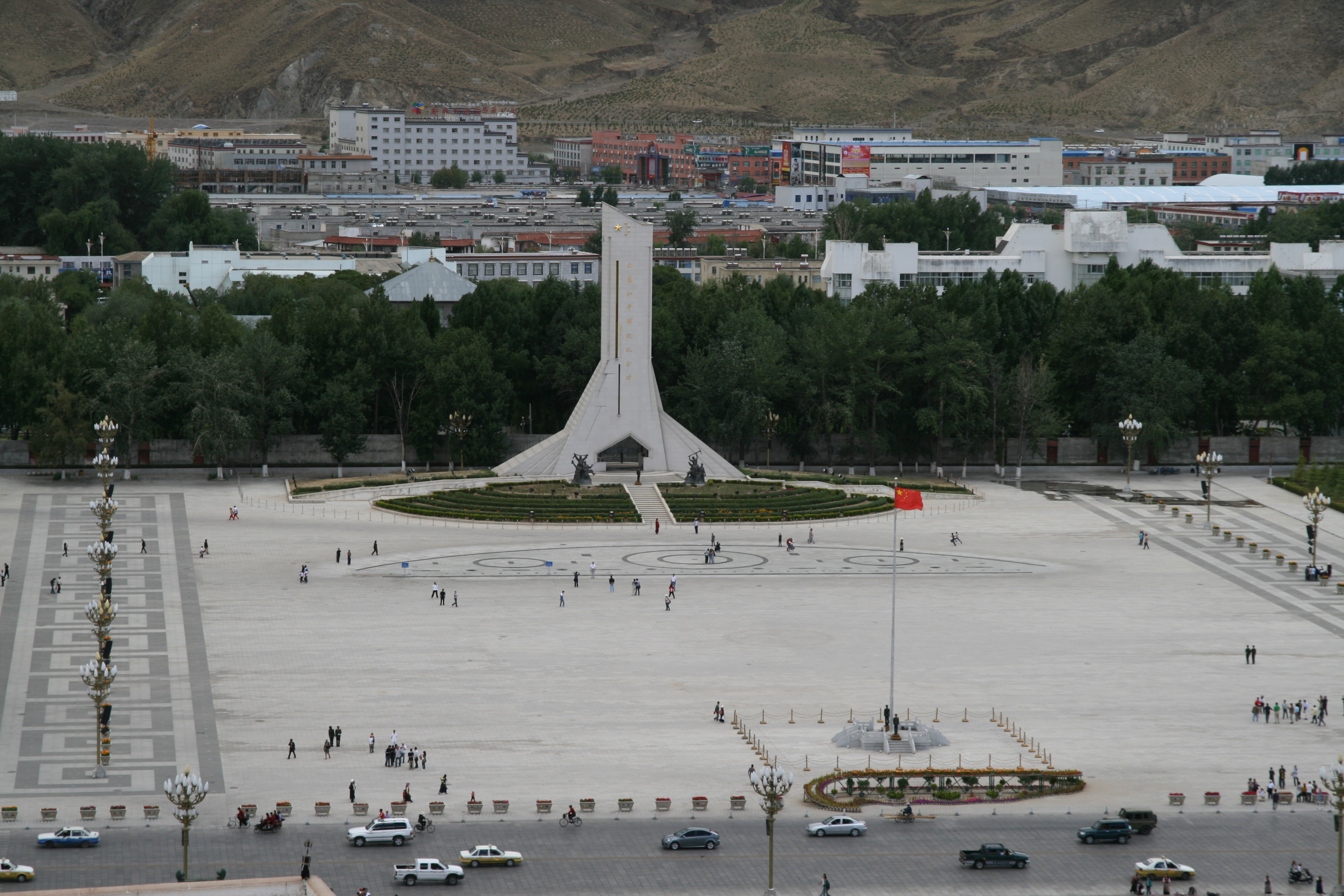
Lhasa, capital of Tibet autonomous region

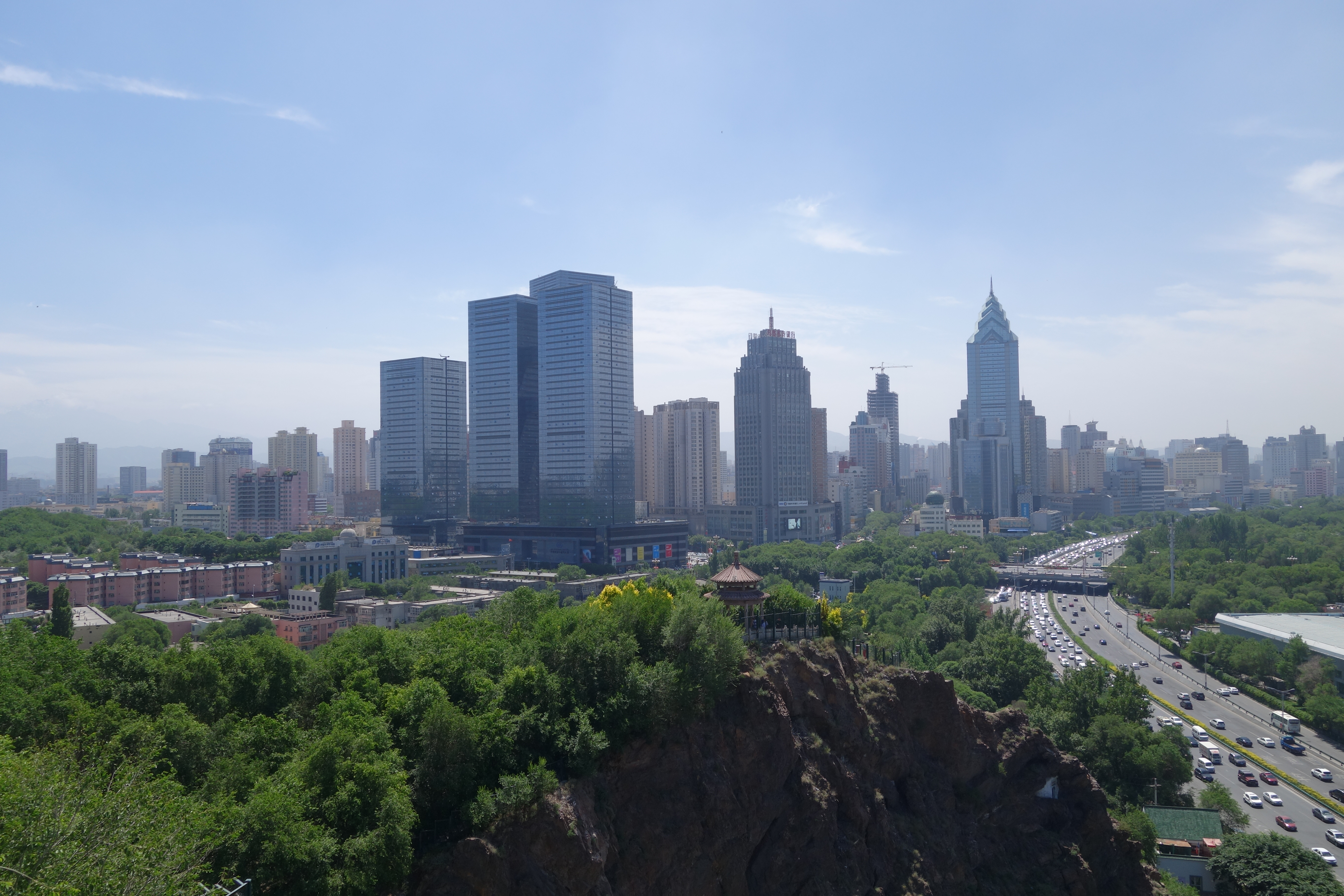
Ürümqi, capital of Xinjiang autonomous region

=== Economic developments ===
China's attempts to develop its western regions have had varied effects on the West's economic development. While massive investment has been accompanied by a boost in GDP across all western regions, the broader policy has failed to achieve its goal of eliminating the economic gap between China's East and West.

Initiatives encouraging Chinese from wealthier and more crowded regions of China to move to the less crowded western regions has resulted in population growth in several cities, most notably Qinghai with its increase of 12.6%.

Nevertheless, the economic growth rate of China's East continues to exceed that of the West, causing the western share of domestic product to continue to fall. The West's contribution to the GDP decreased from 20.88% in 1990 to 17.13% in 2000. Relative levels of GDP per capita in the West decreased from 73.30% in 1990 to 60.87% in 2000. In 1990, Shanghai's per capita GDP was 7.3 times that of Guizhou, the poorest province in China; by 2000, the figure had grown to 12.9 times. Evidence from the China Statistical Yearbook also confirms the increasing economic gap between China's West and East, indicating that the east-to-west GDP ratio increased from 2.98 in 1980 to 4.33 in 2000.

Xi Jinping's Belt and Road Initiative built upon the strategies of Jiang's Western development efforts.

=== Foreign investment ===
Since the introduction of economic reform and open-door policy in 1978, the western region has been in a disadvantageous economic position because it promises a less lucrative return to the investors than its eastern competitors. Therefore, one of the major objectives of the Open Up the West initiative was to bring in foreign investment by creating a more stable investing environment through infrastructure construction. This was a success for the western development project at some level, for statistics shows a substantial growth in foreign investment in the western regions, from US$1,837.35 million in 1999 to $1,922.19 million in 2001. However, not all areas in the western region shared in this progress. While foreign direct investment in Chongqing grew US$17.56 million between 1999 and 2001 (from US$238.93 million to $256.49 million), foreign investment in Guizhou, Guangxi and Ningxi declined significantly, dropping about US$19.71, $250.96 million, and $34.54 million respectively.

The situation in Guizhou reveals a particularly pernicious effect of the Western Development Program. Despite the fact that Guizhou received 53.3 billion yuan in infrastructure construction in 2001 alone, more than the total amount given by the Ninth Five-Year Plan (1995–2000), its foreign capital declined from US$40.9 million in 1999 to $29.29 million in 2001, an astonishing 31% decline, reaching its lowest point since 1997. Contrary to what the state had intended, the West-East Electricity Transfer Project in Guizhou only assured the continued increase in foreign investment on the coast, as most of the electricity generated in Guizhou was transmitted to Guangdong.

Tim Oakes, associate professor of geography at the University of Colorado at Boulder, argues that the decline of foreign investment in certain western regions is a consequence of Beijing's attempt to recentralize the province's economy through mega-projects such as Guizhou's west–east electricity transfer project. The strengthening of central control over the economy has eroded the trust of foreign investors. In the case of Guizhou, while the Chinese central government intended to attract foreign investment in the power sector through the West-East Electricity Transfer Project, only 5% of foreign investment entered the energy sector. About 75% of Guizhou's foreign investment was channeled into manufacturing and 15% to real estate development. Because the campaign's economic program is strongly central planned, the campaign has actually discouraged foreign investment, working against its original intent.

=== Environmental protection ===
Foreseeing significant environmental impacts in the massive infrastructure development program, the state highly publicizes environmental preservation in its campaign to open up the West. Farmland conversion to forest and grassland is the dominant strategy for this effort, targeting specifically the regions crucial to the Yangtze's protection. In Sichuan, the government aims to protect the 19.23 million hectares of existing forest and plant an additional 2.93 million hectares of new forest to diminish the amount of silt flowing into the Yangtze. Around 1,333 hectares (3,290 acres) of farmland was converted in Guizhou in 2001, a key region for Yangtze preservation. In Shaanxi, 571,000 hectares of farmland and 427,000 hectares of wasteland were converted to forest or grass between 1999 and 2002. Another 280,000 hectares of farmland and the same expanse of wasteland were converted in 2003. China's environmental program in the west has made China "one of a few countries in the world that have been rapidly increasing their forest cover," according to David Dollar, director of the World Bank in China.

Although the project seems to be going successfully, it creates a potential fiscal burden for the government. Massive farmland conversion requires a tremendous amount of funding for resettling the farmers. In addition, to compensate farmers for their loss in agricultural profit, the state has committed to supplying them with grains and funds for planting trees and grass. This results in a prescribed allotment of 60 yuan per mu by the central policy. A further complication is farmer dissatisfaction when the government fails to deliver on its contract, since the local government usually bases compensation on actual production value, resulting in compensation between 20 and 50 yuan, plus a 300 jin appropriation of grain.

Farmers who are temporarily benefiting from the compensation will soon rely on governmental subsidy once the tree-planting project is completed. 81,000 tons of grain, 154 million yuan in cash subsidies and 266 million yuan for tree saplings to almost 800,000 farming households have already been spent in Shaanxi. If the provincial government decides to honor its commitment for another 5–8 years, it will cost a total of 11.7 billion yuan in grain and cash subsidies. The heavy financial cost makes the sustainability of the environmental project questionable.

Furthermore, while the environmental project is critically emphasized in the campaign, very little has been discussed on the impact of intensified coal extraction, increased thermal plant operation, reservoir inundation, and transportation and transmission line construction, all of which create a more detrimental impact to the environment that the environmental program can compensate for.

== See also ==
- Bohai Economic Rim
- Yangtze River Delta Economic Zone
- Northeast China Revitalization
- Rise of Central China Plan
- Economy of China
- West Triangle Economic Zone
