= West Triangle Economic Zone =

West Triangle Economic Zone 西三角经济区
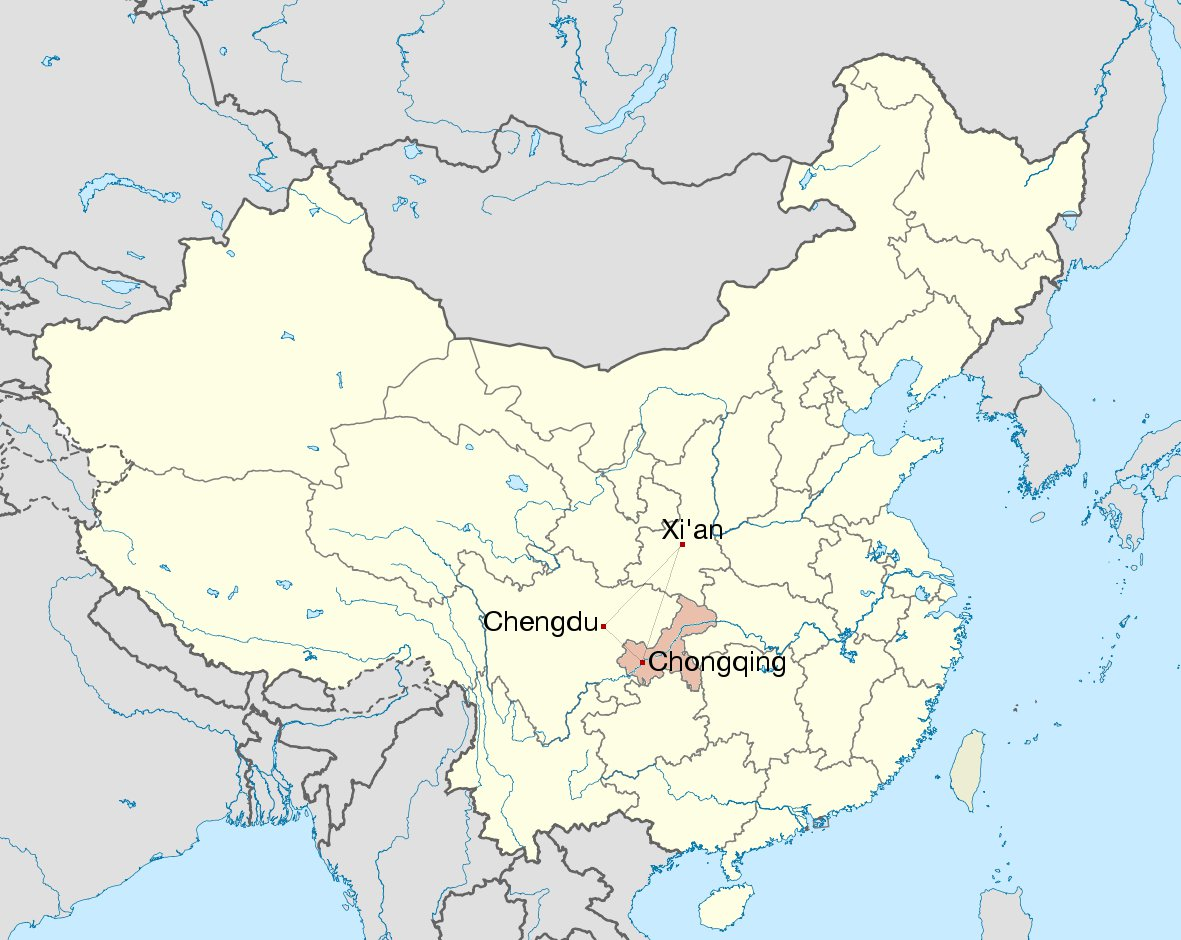
- The locations of the three cities which form the Economic Zone. Chongqing Municipality is shaded red.
- Province: Chongqing (municipality); Sichuan; Shaanxi
- Major Cities: Chongqing; Chengdu; Xi'an; Nanchong; Xianyang

Government
  - Mayor of Chongqing: Huang Qifan
  - Governor of Sichuan: Wei Hong
  - Governor of Shaanxi: Lou Qinjian
- Time zone: UTC+8 (CST)

West Triangle Economic Zone
- Traditional Chinese: 西三角經濟圈
- Simplified Chinese: 西三角经济圈
Transcriptions
Standard Mandarin
- Hanyu Pinyin: Xī sānjiǎo jīngjì quān

The West Triangle Economic Zone is an economic zone designated by the Chinese government comprising Chengdu, Chongqing and Xi'an. Created as part of China's Western Development strategy, the West Triangle Economic Zone contributes nearly 40% of Western China's GDP. Furthermore, Chongqing is one of China's five National Central Cities, while both Chengdu and Xi'an are Regional Central Cities.

The economies of all three cities are highly developed and serve as attractive investment locations within China. Many major international companies have factories or branches in the region, including Microsoft, Ford Motors, Citigroup, and over 200 other Fortune 500 companies.

Overall, the zone has a population of 118 million and covers 220,000 square kilometres. Various major expressways and railways run through the zone, and each of the three cities has a major international airport.

== Formation ==
The creation of the zone was originally proposed by Chongqing in 2009, as part of the 12th Chinese 5-year plan. Xi'an and Chengdu agreed to the proposal.

In September 2009, the proposal was submitted to the National Development and Reform Commission.

The creation of such an economic zone serves a larger part within the China Western Development policy. It was hoped that the consolidation of three major cities into one zone would accelerate the development of other areas in Western China.

Traditionally, the West of China has been weaker economically, as it promises a less lucrative return to the investors than its eastern competitors. Thus, the China Western Development policy aimed to attract foreign investment. This was to be done by creating a more stable investing environment through infrastructure construction. The creation of a new economic zone would encourage cooperation between cities, which would lead to greater rates of progress.

This was a success for the western development project at some level, for statistics show a substantial growth in foreign investment in the western regions. However, the rate of progress was not equal in all regions, partially due to the creation of the West Triangle Economic Zone, which sped up development in Chengdu, Chongqing, and Xi'an, but slowed down development in other areas of the West. For example, while foreign direct investment in Chongqing grew, foreign investment in other Western Chinese cities like Guizhou, Guangxi, and Ningxia declined significantly, dropping about US$19.71, $250.96 million, and $34.54 million respectively.

The federal government's strategy in both the West Triangle and Western China in general is to provide large amounts of monetary investment in order to provide an industrial and infrastructure base, which would then attract foreign investment. Areas which the government has invested heavily in include infrastructure, enticement of foreign investment, ecological protection, education, and retention of talent flowing to richer provinces or foreign nations. Over RMB 1 trillion has been spent on the West as a whole.

== Economy ==
=== Chengdu ===
Map of Chengdu showing infrastructures and land use, made by the CIA in 1989; about half of the city's current size.

Chengdu has been officially designated China's western center of logistics, commerce, finance, science and technology, as well as a hub of transportation and communication. It is also an important base for manufacturing and agriculture. It is a highly economically competitive city within China; according to a Taiwanese report, Chengdu is the second most attractive city for business in China, and the World Bank's 2007 survey report on global investment environments declared Chengdu "a benchmark city for investment environment in inland China". Important locally based companies include Chengdu Sugar and Wine Co. Ltd., Chengdu Food Group, Sichuan Medicine Co. Ltd., Chengdu Automobile Co. Ltd. etc., which support the city's food, medicine, machinery and information technology industries.

Many companies have invested in Chengdu. Among the world's 500 largest companies, 133 of them have subsidiaries or branch offices in Chengdu. These corporations include Intel, Cisco, Sony and Toyota that have assembly and manufacturing bases. Also, Motorola, LM Ericsson, and Microsoft have R&D centers in Chengdu.

Chengdu's foremost industry is information technology, and has long been established as a national base for the electronics and the IT industry. As one of the 8 major communication hubs of China, Chengdu is the node of the nationwide fiber-optic communication network.

Furthermore, Chengdu has also attracted many other major global corporations, including Citigroup, HSBC, Standard Chartered Bank, ABN AMRO, BNP Paribas, JPMorgan Chase and The Bank of Tokyo-Mitsubishi UFJ in the banking sector. It is expected that by 2012, value-added financial services will make up 14% of the added-value service industry and 7% of the regional GDP. By 2015, those figures are expected to grow to 18% and 9% respectively.

=== Chongqing ===
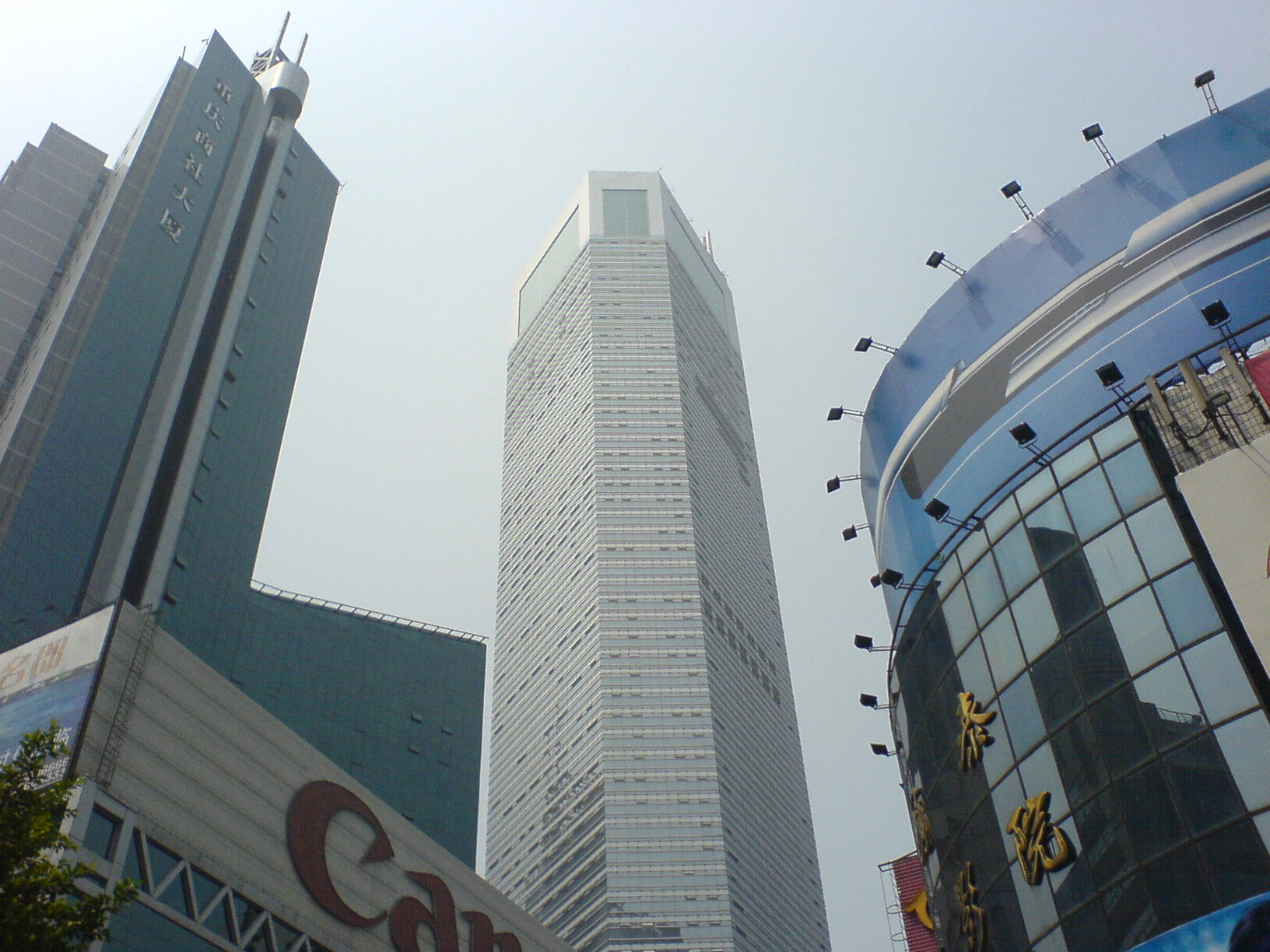
Commercial skyscrapers and high-rise buildings around the People's Liberation Monument in downtown Chongqing.

Chongqing was separated from Sichuan province and made into a province-level municipality in March 1997. in order to accelerate its development. It was also hoped that China's relatively poorer western areas would be further developed as well.

As well as being an important industrial area in western China, Chongqing is also rapidly urbanising. For instance, new construction added approximately 137,000 square meters (1.5 million square feet) daily of usable floor space to satisfy demands for residential, commercial and factory space. More than 1,300 people move into the city daily, bolstering the economy by approximately 100 million Yuan.

With an annual output capacity of 1.2 million automobiles, Chongqing produces 15% of China's total output. Changan Automotive Corp (China's fourth largest automaker), Lifan Hongda Enterprise, and Ford Motor Company all produce automobiles in Chongqing, with the US car giant having 3 plants.

The municipality is also one of the nine largest iron and steel centres in China and one of the three major aluminum producers. Important manufacturers include Chongqing Iron and Steel Company and South West Aluminum, Asia's largest aluminum plant. Manufacturing industries are supported by abundant natural resources including large deposits of coal, natural gas, and more than 40 kinds of minerals such as strontium and manganese. Coal reserves amount to approximately 4.8 billion tonnes, while Chuandong Natural Gas Field is China's largest inland gas field with deposits of around 270 billion m^{3} - more than 1/5 of China's total.

Chongqing was ranked among the top ten most attractive cities to investing by a Taiwanese report, and is also one of the National Central Cities.

=== Xi'an ===
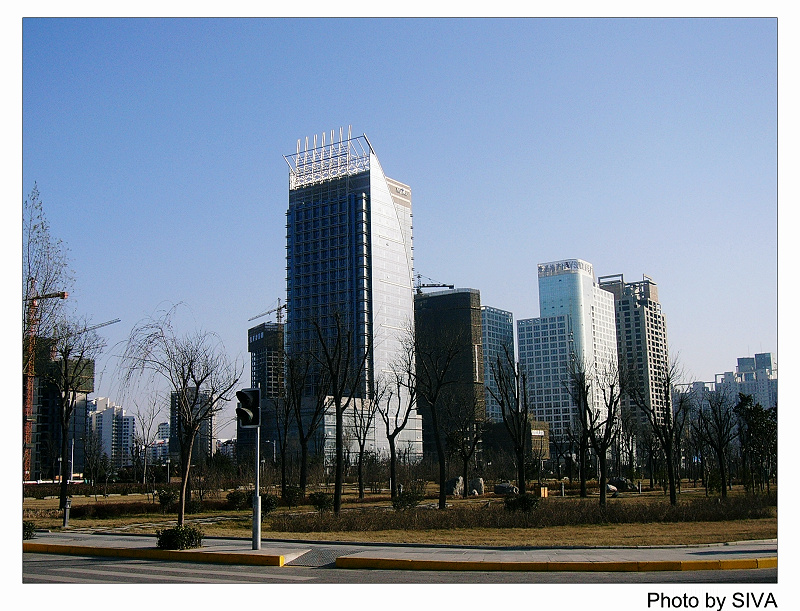
CBD, Tangyan Road, Xi'an.

Xi'an is the largest economy of Shaanxi province, with a GDP of 324.1 billion Yuan in 2010. On average this value increases by 14.5% annually, and accounts for approximately 41.8% of Shaanxi's total GDP. At least fifty-eight countries have established over 2,560 enterprises in Xian, including nineteen of the Fortune 500 enterprises. These include ABB, Boeing, Coca-Cola, Fujitsu, Mitsubishi and Toshiba. As part of the Western Development policy, Xi’an became a major target for accelerated attention. From 1997 to 2006, the industrial output value of Xi’an's service industry increased at an annual average rate of 13.74% representing a growth from US$8.113 billion to US$25.85 billion.

Xi'an is also one of the first service outsourcing cities in China, with over 800 corporations in the industry. The city's output value from this sector exceeded RMB 23 billion in 2008. Employment in the sector doubled from 1997 to 2006, from a base of 60,000, and computer consulting also doubled from 16,000 to 32,000. As a result of the importance of the software-outsourcing industry, the city planned construction of a Software New Town, which was scheduled to be completed in 2015 with an investment of 30 billion Yuan. Other major export goods include lighting equipment and automobile parts, while its major import goods are mechanical and electrical products. Internationally, Xi'an's largest trade partner is the United States.

Other important industries include equipment manufacturing and tourism. The manufacturing industry has an annual output of 36.5 billion Yuan, accounting for 44.5% of the city's total. Furthermore, as one of China's four ancient capitals, Xi'an's many cultural sites, including the Terracotta Army, the City Wall of Xi'an, and the Famen Temple, make tourism an important industry as well. In 2010, 52 million domestic tourists visited Xi'an, earning a total income of RMB 40.52 billion. On average, revenue increases by 36.4% per year, and foreign-exchange earnings (530 million in 2009) increase by around 35.8%.

== Government ==
=== Chengdu ===
The city of Chengdu is the capital of Sichuan province, and it has sub-provincial administrative status. It contains 9 districts, 4 county-level cities, and 6 counties. The mayor is Ge Honglin, and the CPC Committee Secretary (who is considered to be more powerful than the mayor) is Huang Xingchu.

=== Chongqing ===
Chongqing is the principal city in Southwest China being one of China's National Central Cities and the only such city in the interior west of China. As such, in 1997, Chongqing was separated from Sichuan province and made into a province-level municipality, the fourth in China after Beijing, Tianjin, and Shanghai. The mayor of Chongqing is Tang Liangzhi and the CPC Committee Secretary is Sun Zhengcai. Chongqing Municipality contains 19 districts, 19 counties, and 1259 towns, townships, and subdistricts.

=== Xi'an ===
Xi'an is the capital of Shaanxi province, and it has sub-provincial administrative status. Additionally, since ancient times, when it was known as Chang'an, it served as the capital of many dynasties. The mayor of Xi'an is Dong Jun, and the CPC Committee Secretary is Sun Qingyun.

== Transportation ==
=== Air ===
Major airports include:

- Chongqing Jiangbei International Airport
- Chengdu Shuangliu International Airport
- Xi'an Xianyang International Airport
- Chengdu Tianfu International Airport (u/c)

=== Land ===
Major highways and expressways passing through the West Triangle Economic Zone include:

- Sichuan-Tibet Highway
- China National Highway 055
- China National Highway 213
- China National Highway 317
- China National Highway 318
- China National Highway 319
- China National Highway 321
- China National Highway 210
- China National Highway 212
- Chongqing-Chengdu Expressway
- Chongqing-Dazhou-Xi'an Highway
- China National Highway 210
- China National Highway 211
- China National Highway 312

=== Rail ===
Stations include:

- Xi'an railway station
- Xi'an North railway station
- Chengdu railway station
- Chengdu East railway station
- Chongqing railway station
- Chongqing North railway station
- Shapingba railway station

Major rail lines include:

- Zhengzhou–Xi'an High-Speed Railway
- Datong–Xi'an Passenger Railway
- Xi'an–Baoji High-Speed Railway
- Xi'an–Chengdu High-Speed Railway
- Chengdu–Chongqing High-Speed Railway
- Chengdu–Dujiangyan High-Speed Railway
- Chongqing-Guiyang Railway
- Chongqing-Xiangyang Railway
- Chongqing-Huaihua Railway
- Chongqing-Suining Railway
- Chongqing-Lichuan Railway
- Chongqing-Lanzhou Railway

== Statistics ==
The zone occupies 220,000 square kilometers and has a population of 118 million, contributing nearly 40% of Western China's GDP.

City	Administrative Area	City Population	GDP	Annual GDP growth rate
Chengdu	12,132 km^{2}	4,266,000	RMB 813.89 billion	13%
Chongqing	82,401 km^{2}	6,690,000	RMB 1,146 billion	13.6%
Xi'an	9983 km^{2}	4,178,000	RMB 386.4 billion	24%

The figure above for Chongqing's Administrative Area includes the entire Municipality of Chongqing whereas the City Population only counts the urbanized districts making up Chongqing city. Thus the population of the administrative area shown will be significantly larger. Chengdu is similar.

== See also ==
- Bohai Economic Rim
- China Western Development
- National Central City
- Pearl River Delta Economic Zone
- Yangtze River Delta Economic Zone
- Chengdu-Chongqing Economic Circle
