= Zhongyuan Economic Zone =

Proposed economic development zone

Zhongyuan Economic Zone (Chinese: 中原经济区; pinyin: Zhōngyuán Jīngjì Qū) or Central Plain Economic Zone is the proposed economic development zone for the economic region in Henan Province and radiating to the surrounding areas by the Henan Provincial Government and the Chinese Central Government.

== See also ==
- Zhongyuan
