= Pearl River Delta Economic Zone =

Economic region in southeastern China

The Pearl River Delta Economic Zone (simplified Chinese: 珠江三角洲经济区; traditional Chinese: 珠江三角洲經濟區; pinyin: Zhūjiāng Sānjiǎozhōu Jīngjìqū) is a special economic zone on the southeastern coast of China. Located in the Pearl River Delta, it consists of the Chinese cities of Guangzhou, Shenzhen, Zhuhai, Foshan, Dongguan, Zhongshan, Jiangmen, and parts of Huizhou and Zhaoqing. Adjacent Hong Kong and Macau are not part of the economic zone.

The 2008–2020 plan, released by China's National Development and Reform Commission, was designed to boost the pan-Pearl River Delta as a "center of advanced manufacturing and modern service industries", and as a "center for international shipping, logistics, trade, conferences and exhibitions and tourism". Goals for that period included the development of two to three new cities in the Guangdong–Hong Kong–Macao Greater Bay Area, the development of 10 new multinational firms, the expansion of road, rail, seaport and airport capacities, and the construction of the 31-mile (50 km) Hong Kong–Zhuhai–Macau Bridge linking Hong Kong, Macau, and the Pearl River Delta. The construction of 1,864 miles (3,000 km) of highways in the region was to be completed by 2012, and rail expansions of 683 miles (1,099 km) by 2012 and 1,367 miles (2,200 km) by 2020.

== Scale ==
The zone is formed by 9 cities, namely Guangzhou, Shenzhen, Foshan, Zhuhai, Jiangmen, Zhongshan, Dongguan, four districts and counties of Huizhou, and four districts and counties of Zhaoqing.

== Population ==
A 2015 report concluded that, if taken as a single urban area, the zone is the largest such area in the world in both area and population, with a population exceeding 75 million inhabitants.

The population density of the Pearl River Delta region is quite high in China and even in the world. Its population growth mainly comes from immigrants, and the natural growth rate of the population does not have a major impact on population growth. The World Bank report uses satellite and geospatial information analysis technology to assess the urbanization progress in the eastern region of Asia, including Northeast Asia and Southeast Asia. It shows that as of 2010, the Pearl River Delta urban area, including Guangzhou, Shenzhen, Foshan and Dongguan, has a population of about 42 million, which is more than the total population of countries such as Argentina, Canada or Malaysia, and has surpassed the Tokyo area of Japan, becoming the world's largest urban area.

== See also ==
- Yangtze River Delta Economic Zone
- Bohai Economic Rim
- West Triangle Economic Zone
- Guangdong-Hong Kong-Macao Greater Bay Area
