= Running Man China season 1 =

Running Man China
- Season 1
- Poster for Season 1
- No. of episodes: 15

Release
- Original network: ZRTG: Zhejiang Television
- Original release: October 10, 2014 – January 16, 2015

Season chronology
- Next → Season 2

This is a list of episodes of the Chinese variety show Running Man in season 1. The show airs on ZRTG: Zhejiang Television.

== Episodes ==
List of episodes (episode 1–15)
(Series) Episode #	(Season) Episode #	Broadcast Date	Guest(s)	Landmark	Teams		Mission	Result
1	1/01 (Note: Chen He was unable to participate in the final mission as he was injured during filming hence his nametag was given to Zheng Kai.)	October 10, 2014 (August 29, 2014)	Dou Xiao, Kim Jong-kook, Ma Su	China Academy of Art (Hangzhou, Zhejiang)	White Jade Snake; Yellow Team (Deng Chao, Li Chen, Ma Su); Blue Team (Angelababy, Chen He, Zheng Kai); Red Team (Wang Baoqiang, Wong Cho-lam, Dou Xiao); Hunter (Kim Jong Kook) (Note: Kim Jong Kook only participated in the final task.)		Obtain number code to open treasure safe before the Hunter rips off your nametag or rip off his nametag (he has the full code on the inside)	Yellow TeamWins; Each receive a gold medal.
2	1/02 (Note: Chen He was unable to participate due to injury.)	October 17, 2014 (August 30, 2014)	Gülnezer Bextiyar, Evonne Hsieh, Tang Yixin, Zhang Lanxin,	Zhao Ming College (Wuzhen, Tongxiang, Zhejiang)	Magic Water; Yellow Team (Deng Chao, Gulnezer Bextiyar); Red Team (Zheng Kai, Angelababy); Pink Team (Wang Baoqiang, Tang Yixin); Green Team (Wong Cho-lam, Zhang Lanxin); Blue Team (Li Chen, Evonne Hsieh)		Choose the correctly colored flask of "memory potion"; the right (yellow) one will bring back memories of love	Yellow Team Wins; Obtain two gold rings.
3	1/03 (Note: Wong Cho-lam was unable to travel to South Korea to participate. His role was filled by Lin Gengxin.)	October 24, 2014 (September 13, 2014)	Lin Gengxin, Ou Han-Sheng, Wang Likun	Seoul Global Culture and Tourism Center (Myeong-dong, Jung, Seoul, South Korea)	Green Team (Deng Chao, Angelababy, Lin Gengxin); Red Team (Wang Baoqiang, Li Chen, Ou Di); Orange Team (Chen He, Zheng Kai, Wang Likun)		Find the missing passports (Note: The concept of the mission comes from Lost in Thailand.)	Green Team Wins
4	1/04	October 31, 2014 (September 14, 2014)	Lin Gengxin, Ou Han-Sheng, Wang Likun	SBS Tanhyeon-dong Production Center (Goyang, Gyeonggi, South Korea)	Green Team (Deng Chao, Angelababy, Lin Gengxin); Red Team (Wang Baoqiang, Li Chen, Ou Di); Orange Team (Chen He, Zheng Kai, Wang Likun)		Find the missing passports	Green Team Wins
5	1/05 (Note: Li Chen was unable to participate in the final task due to injury that occurred during filming.)	November 7, 2014 (September 15, 2014)	Lin Gengxin and cast of Running Man (Yoo Jae-suk, Ji Suk-jin, Kim Jong-kook, Gary, Haha, Song Ji-hyo, Lee Kwang-soo)	Jeju Aerospace Museum (Seogwipo, Jeju, South Korea)	Paper Boats River Crossing; Boat Chen He Brothers (Li Chen, Chen He); Boat Navigator Lord (Deng Chao, Angelababy, Lin Gengxin); Boat Zheng Wang #1 (Zheng Kai, Wang Baoqiang)	Running Man Team (China) (Deng Chao, Angelababy, Wang Baoqiang, Chen He, Lin Gengxin, Li Chen, Zheng Kai); Running Man Team (Korea) (Yoo Jae-suk, Ji Suk-jin, Kim Jong-kook, Gary, Haha, Song Ji-hyo, Lee Kwang-soo)	Defeat the other team and open the door to the magic oil	Running Man Team (Korea)Wins; Running Man Team (China) successfully open door with given keys.
6	1/06 (Note: Li Chen was unable to participate due to injuries sustained in Episode 5.)	November 14, 2014 (September 24, 2014)	Hu Haiquan (Yu Quan), Yi Yi	Xiushan Island (Zhoushan, Zhejiang)	Blue Team (Deng Chao, Angelababy, Zheng Kai, Chen He); Red Team (Wang Baoqiang, Wong Cho-lam, Hu Haiquan, Yi Yi)		Escape from Xiushan Island	Red Team Wins; Red Team escapes from Xiushan Island in a helicopter.
07	1/7 (Note: Angelababy was unable to travel to filming. Her role was filled by Yi Yi.)	November 21, 2014 (September 24, 2014)	Hu Haiquan (Yu Quan), Yi Yi	1933 Shanghai (Liyang, Hongkou, Shanghai)	Love Through the Centuries Battle; Zheng Kai and Yi Yi, everyone else for themselves		Defeat the other members	Zheng Kai Wins; Receives sapphire necklace which he gives to Yi Yi.
08	1/08	November 28, 2014 (October 14, 2014)	Angus Guo, Anthony Guo (2moro), Guan Zhe, Yu Zhen	Gansu Dunhuang Vocational Secondary School (Dunhuang, Gansu)	Dunhuang Robbery; Caravan Team (Deng Chao, Angelababy, Wong Cho-lam, Li Chen, Zheng Kai); Thieves Team (Guan Zhe, Yu Zhen, Anthony Guo, Angus Guo); Spy Team (Wang Baoqiang, Chen He)		Defeat the other teams	Caravan Team Wins; Team members receive eight jade glasses.
09	1/09 (Note: Wong Cho-lam was unable to travel to filming. Shen Ling filled his role.)	December 5, 2014 (October 15, 2014)	Shen Ling, Evonne Hsieh, Xiong Dailin	Crescent Lake (Dunhuang, Gansu)	Princess Desert Battle; Princess Lynn Team (Xiong Dailin, Deng Chao, Zheng Kai); Princess Baby Team (Angelababy, Wang Baoqiang, Shen Ling); Princess Yi-lin Team (Xie Yie-lin, Chen He, Li Chen)	Final Task; Princess Lynn Team (Xiong Dailin, Shen Ling, Li Chen); Princess Baby Team (Angelababy, Deng Chao, Wang Baoqiang); Princess Yi-lin Team (Sie Yi-lin, Chen He, Zheng Kai)	Defeat the other teams	Princess Lynn Team Wins; Xiong Dailin, Shen Ling, and Li Chen each receive gold badges and medals. Shen Ling and Li Chen gave their medals to Angelababy and Sie Yi-lin.
10	1/10 (Note: Wong Cho-lam was injured during the final task and was unable to continue in the mission. The production team agreed that Yuan Hong would receive his word.)	December 12, 2014 (October 27 & 28, 2014)	Guo Jingfei, Yuan Hong, Zhang Xinyi	Wuhan Movie Theme Park (Chu River and Han Street, Wuhan, Hubei)	Legend of Chu and Han; Chu Team (Marshal - Minister - Chariot - Cannon - Soldier) (Chen He - Angelababy - Zheng Kai - Deng Chao - Li Chen); Han Team (General - Minister - Chariot - Cannon - Pawn) (Wang Baoqiang - Wong Cho-lam - Guo Jingfei - Yuan Hong - Zhang Xinyi)		Defeat the other team	Han Team Wins; Receive silver ingots. Both teams agree to cash them and donate to a charity that provides running shoes to needy children.
11	1/11	December 19, 2014 (October 28 & 29, 2014)	Gui Gui, JJ Lin	Wuhan Iron and Steel (Qingshan, Wuhan, Hubei)	Three University Tournament; D University Team (Deng Chao, Wang Baoqiang, Wong Cho-lam); A University Team (Angelababy, Chen He, Zheng Kai); L University Team Team (Li Chen, JJ Lin, Gui Gui)		Defeat the other teams	L University Team Team Wins; L University Team receives gold abacuses. A University Team wins silver abacuses. D University Team wins authentic abacuses.
12	1/12	December 26, 2014 (November 8, 2014)	Blackie Chen, Sun Yang, Zhao Liying	Zhejiang University of Media and Communications (Xiasha, Hangzhou, Zhejiang)	Name Tag Elimination; No Teams	Sports Meet; Green Team (Deng Chao, Angelababy, Wong Cho-lam, Zheng Kai, Sun Yang); Red Team (Wang Baoqiang, Chen He, Li Chen, Zhao Liying, Blackie Chen)	Get R Money for lottery	Red Team Wins and agree to cash trip prize and donate to a charity that provides running shoes to needy children
13	1/13	January 2, 2015 (November 10, 2014)	No Guests	Zhejiang Xinyuan International Studios (Hangzhou, Zhejiang)	Mission Team (Angelababy, Wang Baoqiang, Chen He, Li Chen, Wong Cho-lam, Zheng Kai)	Mysterious Man (Deng Chao)	Find the mysterious man	Deng Chao Wins; Receives seven gold bars to keep. He decided to give one bar each to the six other members.
14	1/14	January 9, 2015 (November 20, 2014)	Bai Baihe, Chen Yufan, Hu Haiquan (Yu Quan)	Cathay Pacific Arts Center (Riverside Road, Yuzhong, Chongqing)	Hot Pot Recipe Battle; Brothers Family (Deng Chao, Angelababy, Zheng Kai, Chen Yufan, Hu Haiquan); Run Family (Wang Baoqiang, Chen He, Wong Cho-lam, Li Chen, Bai Baihe)	Final Task; Secret Partners (Angelababy, Chen He); Brothers Family (Deng Chao, Zheng Kai, Chen Yufan, Hu Haiquan); Run Family (Wang Baoqiang, Wong Cho-lam, Li Chen, Bai Baihe)	Find the secret partners from the two families	Secret Partners Win; Receives silver bowl, silver spoon, and ancestral hot pot recipe.
15	1/15	January 16, 2015 (November 22, 2014)	No Guests	Chongqing Science and Technology Museum (Jiangbeizui CBD, Jiangbei, Chongqing)	Super Powers Special; No Teams		Defeat the other members to be deemed the best of Running Man China	Angelababy Wins; Receives secret manual, gold prize and best player trophy for Season 1.
