= Grand Theater station (Chongqing Rail Transit) =

Train station in Chongqing, China

Grand Theater 大剧院
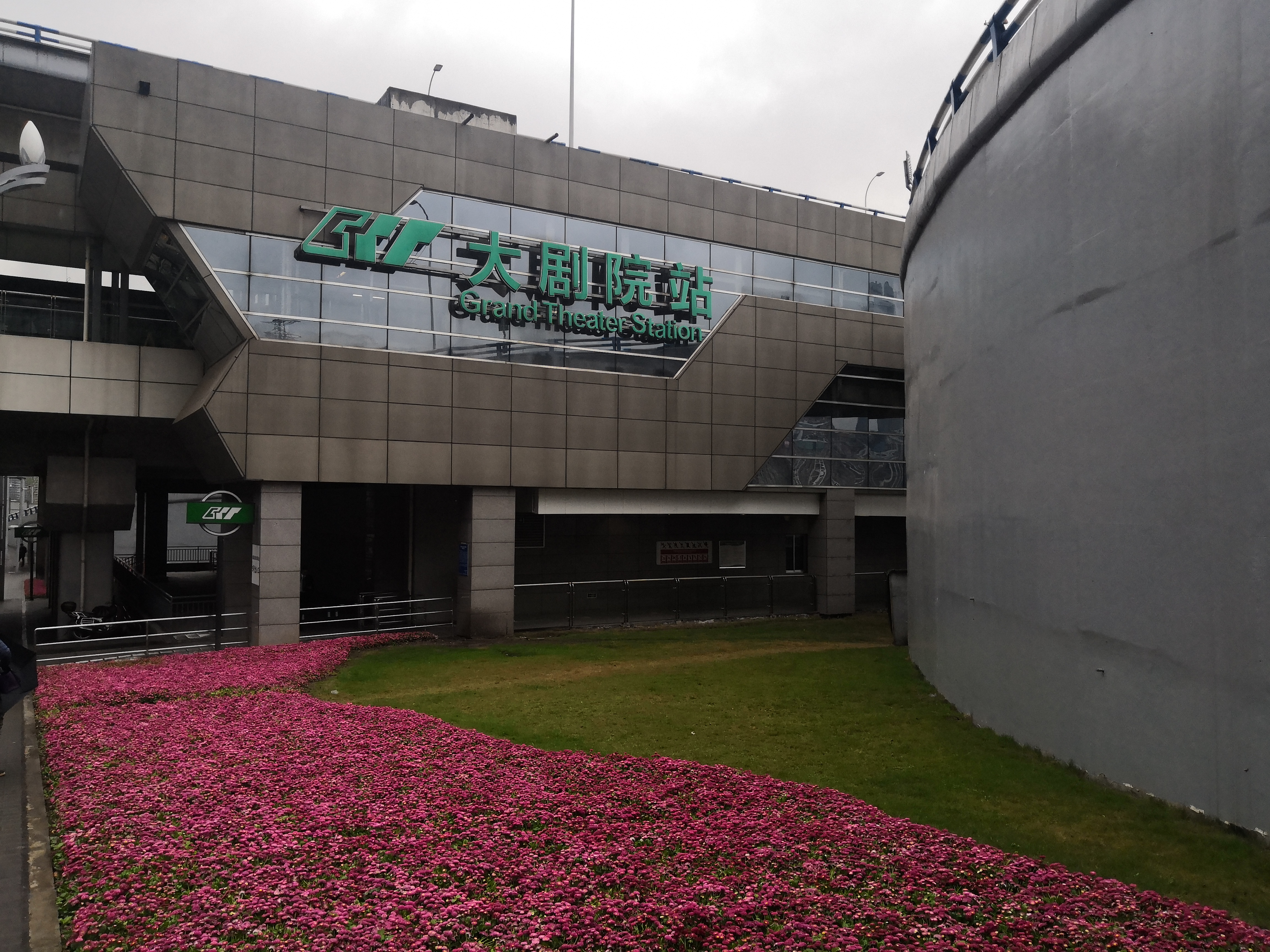

General information
- Location: Chongqing; China
- Operated by: Chongqing Rail Transit Corp., Ltd
- Line: Line 6
- Platforms: 2 (side platforms)

Construction
- Structure type: Elevated and underground
- Accessible: Yes

Other information
- Station code: 6/07

History
- Opened: 30 December 2014; 11 years ago

Services
Preceding station	Chongqing Rail Transit	Following station
Xiaoshizi towards Chayuan	Line 6	Jiangbeicheng towards Beibei
Location

Grand Theater is a metro station of Line 6 of Chongqing Rail Transit in Jiangbei District of Chongqing Municipality, China.

It serves the theater in which the station's name derived from (Chongqing Grand Theater) and its surrounding area, including the Chongqing Science and Technology Museum and office buildings in the Jiangbeizui CBD.

The station opened on December 30, 2014.

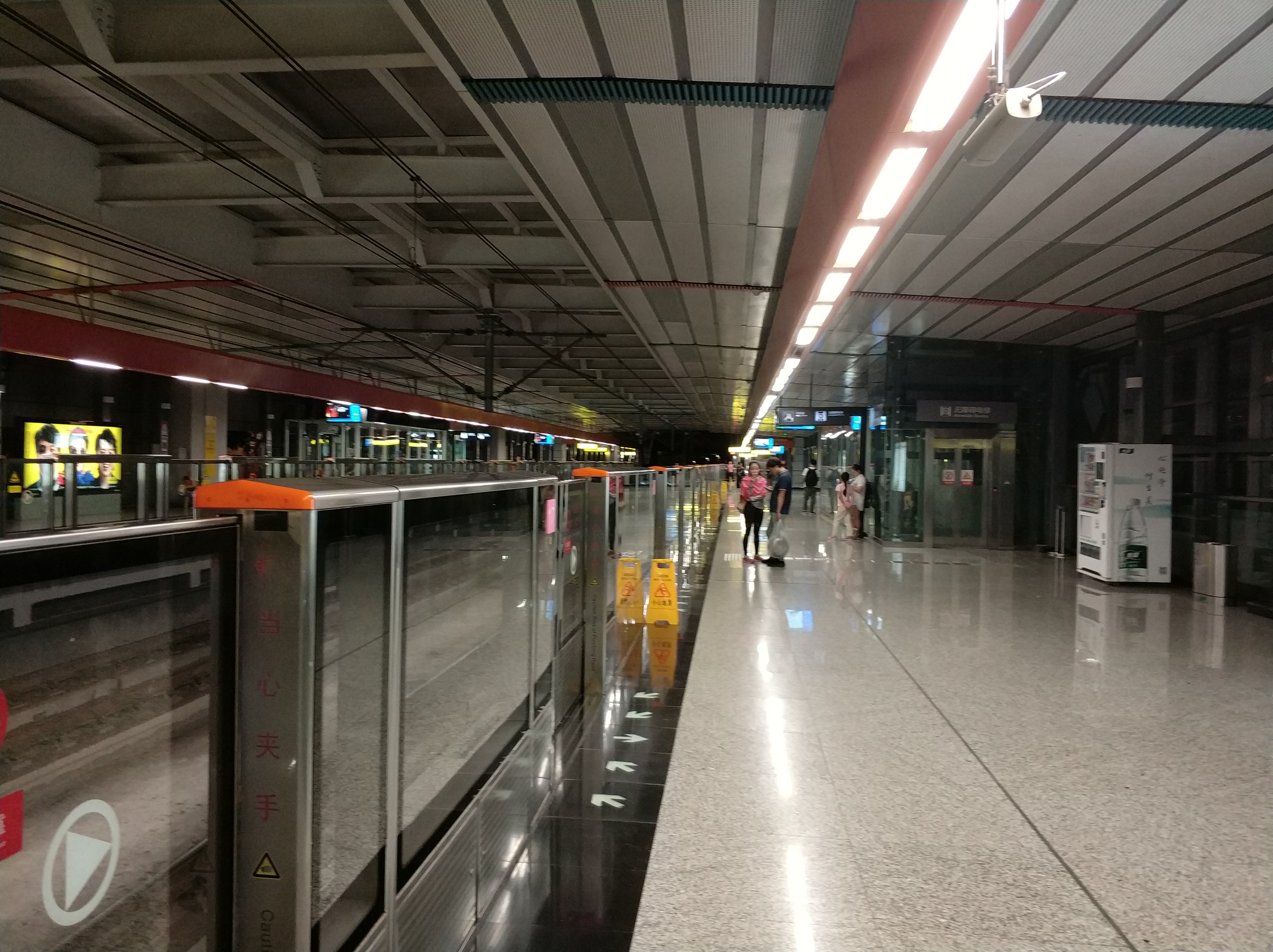
Station Platform

== Station structure ==
=== Floors ===
Due to its location below the car lanes of Qiansimen Jialing River Bridge and different elevations in its vicinity, the majority of the station is elevated, but just below the car lanes of the bridge, with the remainder being underground (2 exits of the station).

=== Line 6 platform ===
Platform Layout

A total of 2 side platforms are used for Line 6 trains travelling in both directions.

	Side Platform Doors open on the right
To Line 6 Beibei	←	6/07	←
	→	6/07	→	To Line 6 Chayuan
	Side Platform Doors open on the right

== Exits ==
There are a total of 4 entrances/exits for the station.

== Surroundings ==
- Chongqing Grand Theater

Nearby Places

- Qiansimen Jialing River Bridge
- Chongqing Science and Technology Museum
- Jiangbeizui CBD

Nearby Stations

- Jiangbeicheng station (a Line 6 & Line 9 station)
- Xiaoshizi station (a Line 1 & Line 6 station)

== See also ==
- Chongqing Grand Theater
- Chongqing Rail Transit (CRT)
- Line 6 (CRT)
