= Guida Moseley Brown Architects =

Guida Moseley Brown Architecture
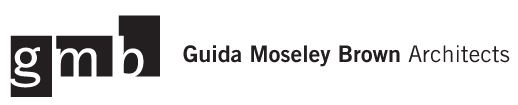
- Type: Private
- Industry: Architecture
- Founded: 1999; Canberra, Australian Capital Territory, Australia
- Founders: Harold Guida LFRAIA AIA
- Area served: Worldwide
- Key people: Harold Guida, Co-founder & Partner
- Services: Architecture; Consulting & Real Estate; Interior Design; Sustainability; Urban Strategies & Design
- Number of employees: 20+ (as of 2020)
- Website: www.gmbarchitects.com

Guida Moseley Brown Architects is an Australian international architectural, interior and urban design firm based in Canberra. The firm specializes in major public buildings, educational and research facilities, large scale residential developments, amongst other commercial and corporate projects.

It was founded in Canberra, in 1999 by a group of professionals involved in the design and construction of Australia's new Parliament House, and has since been involved in multiple urban design and master planning projects across the Asia Pacific.

== History ==
Guida Moseley Brown Architects dates its origins back to the year 1999 when the core group of professionals who had worked together on Australia's new Parliament House at Mitchell/Giurgola & Thorp Architects decided to restructure the firm to Guida Moseley Brown Architects. Harold Guida, the partner-in-charge of design co-ordination for the new Parliament House is a co-founder and senior partner of the firm. He received his Master of Architecture (Urban Design) from the University of California, Los Angeles, and had previously obtained a Bachelor of Architecture from Arizona State University.

== Architectural Style ==
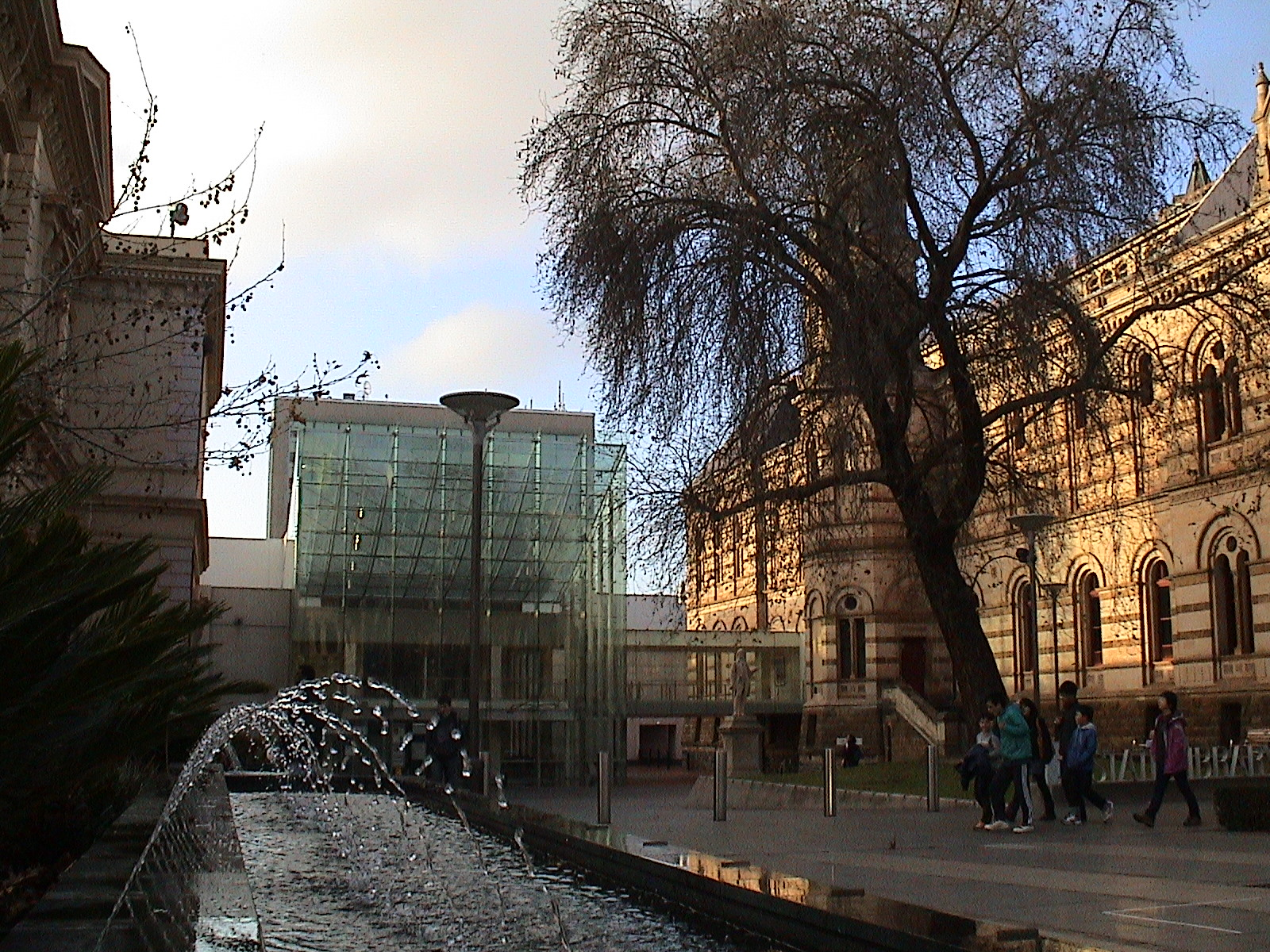
The modern Spence Wing entrance of the State Library of South Australia connects the Institute Building (1861, left) and the Mortlock Wing (1884, right)

Guida Moseley Brown Architects is widely known for projects that respond to heritage and culture, whilst focusing on sustainability and functionality. The redevelopment of the State Library of South Australia in Adelaide by the firm for example, helped bring in light and a sense of space to a library that was previously considered as a 'closed-in building'. The redevelopment helped open up the views to the previously visually inaccessible heritage buildings in the vicinity [refer to image]. The style was highly commended and celebrated by its stakeholders as the end result was a merge of indoor and outside environments alongside the preservation of the cultural heritage the library held. Similarly, the restoration of the Embassy of Sweden in Canberra, Australia is known for its noteworthy Nordic-style and ventilated substructure. The firm had replaced its worn-out floors with rare timbers that were hard waxed to provide a traditional Swedish ambience.

In regards to functionality, the firm was responsible for the urban design and master planning of the new Passenger Terminal at Canberra Airport. The terminal was designed to a high environmental standard as the firm had aimed for the airport to be the greenest in the country. The project intended to delight and decrease stress amongst fellow passengers by articulating space and introducing purpose-designed furniture. The airport also integrated a new lighting scheme to aid its passengers. The entire project was designed, documented and constructed in less than ten months. Similarly, Guida Moseley Brown is currently also part of the Leh Airport project, in Jammu Kashmir, India. The existing airport is the 23rd highest commercial airport in the world (situated at 10,682 feet above sea-level). Named after an Indian statesmen and monk, and situated in between the Himalayas, the Kushok Bakula Rimpochee Airport is known for its challenging environment and scenic approach. Apart from ensuring that the new airport integrates the local cultural and spirituality in the airport's architecture, Guida Moseley Brown also focused on the functionality of the airport as the surrounding area faces long winters and temperatures often being below zero. The construction of the terminal began in February, 2019 and is expected to finish by September, 2021. As of January 2020, 20% of the work is considered to be completed.

As of recent, the firm has focused on futuristic themes and designs. The proposed Canberra Convention Centre – Australia Forum has been dubbed as 'futuristic' and 'UFO like' in design. The design of the convention centre has brought in Guida Moseley Brown's traditional concept of bringing natural light to the neo-futuristic undulated structure. The centre has an unlikely aerodynamic form to stand out as a hyper-modern element in the architectural landscape of Canberra.

On 18 November 2018, Harold Guida spoke about the increase in the global interest of the "Univer-Cities" concept in a conference held at Nanyang Technological University, Singapore. The firm at the time was involved in the Campus Master Plan for the NTU. The master plan helped address issues such as the rise in student housing, environmental issues and sub-standard academic infrastructure. The firm ensured that the campus' immediate environment such as the established Chinese Garden values were incorporated throughout the entire campus via small group learning hubs and opening of the existing land-locked boundaries.

== Significant Projects ==
=== Completed Projects ===
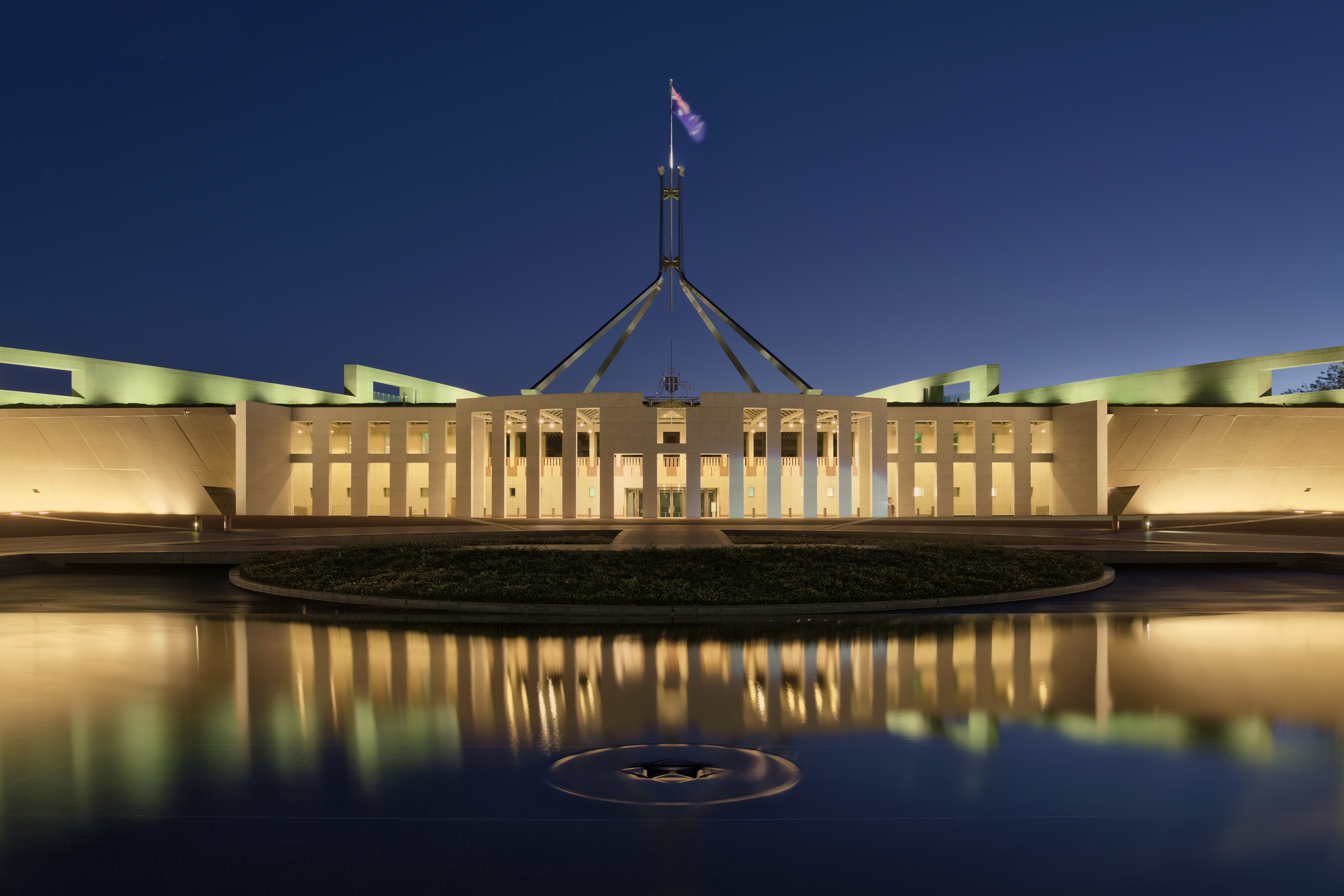
Spire and the Australian Flag, New Parliament House, Capital Hill.

In 1978, the Fraser government passed the proposal to build the new Parliament House on Capital Hill, Canberra. Out of the 329 entries that competed from around the world, Guida Moseley Brown (then Mitchell/Giurgola) was awarded the contract to masterplan, design, document and supervise the new Parliament House project. Construction commenced by 1981, and was inaugurated by Queen Elizabeth II on 9 May 1988. The project did not meet its deadline and was overbudgeted by A$800 million (final cost is estimated to be around A$1.1 billion to the proposed A$220 million). The design involved submerging most of the building under Capital Hill and mostly showcasing the huge spire that held the large Australian flag.

In Tamar, Hong Kong, Guida Moseley Brown joined forces with Hong Kong architects, Rocco Design to design the interior architecture of the centrepiece Chamber for the Legislative Council of Hong Kong. Guida Moseley Brown designed the interior in a way to accommodate the external building form and architectural character of its surroundings. The surrounding buildings were designed in order to symbolize the unity of the diverse functions of the Hong Kong government, which is why Guida Moseley Brown extensively used glass and vertical lines to signify the independence, openness and solemnity of the legislature. Considered as one of Hong Kong's iconic tourist attraction, visitors and tourists are known to take guided tours to learn about its architecture and work of the legislature.

Guida Moseley Brown Architects were also involved in the project to build the Chongqing Science and Technology Museum project in Jiangbeizui CBD, Chongqing, China, built 2006–09. The museum cost 567 million RMB to build. It is on a plot of 37 mu and the building has a floor area of 45,300 m^{2}.

=== Upcoming projects ===
The Australia Forum is one of the most highly anticipated Australian projects of the decade. In 2017, the ACT government in its mid-year budget withdrew the funding for the preparation of a business case of the forum. Reports suggest that the figure for constructing the forum would cross A$900 million (an increase of $417 million from the initially proposed A$433 million). At A$433 million, the centre was supposed to bring in a net benefit of A$2.40 for per dollar spent. Therefore, the following impact on the cost-benefit ratio could be one of the reasons behind the stall.

In China, Guida Moseley Brown have been invited multiple times to submit their designs in bid to contribute to China's rapid modernization plans. Guida Moseley Brown have designed several social and cultural infrastructure projects in megacities such as Chongqing and Suzhou. In Suzhou, Guida Moseley Brown along with the Suzhou Industrial Park Design & Research Institute are responsible for the upcoming Duke Kunshan University's Library. The upcoming five-floored library is estimated to have a floor area of 15,000 m2 which will also be host to cultural facilities such as a hall, theatre and numerous other retail areas. The library architecturally pays ode to traditional Chinese forms through its large glass frame that's fixed by strong stone elements.

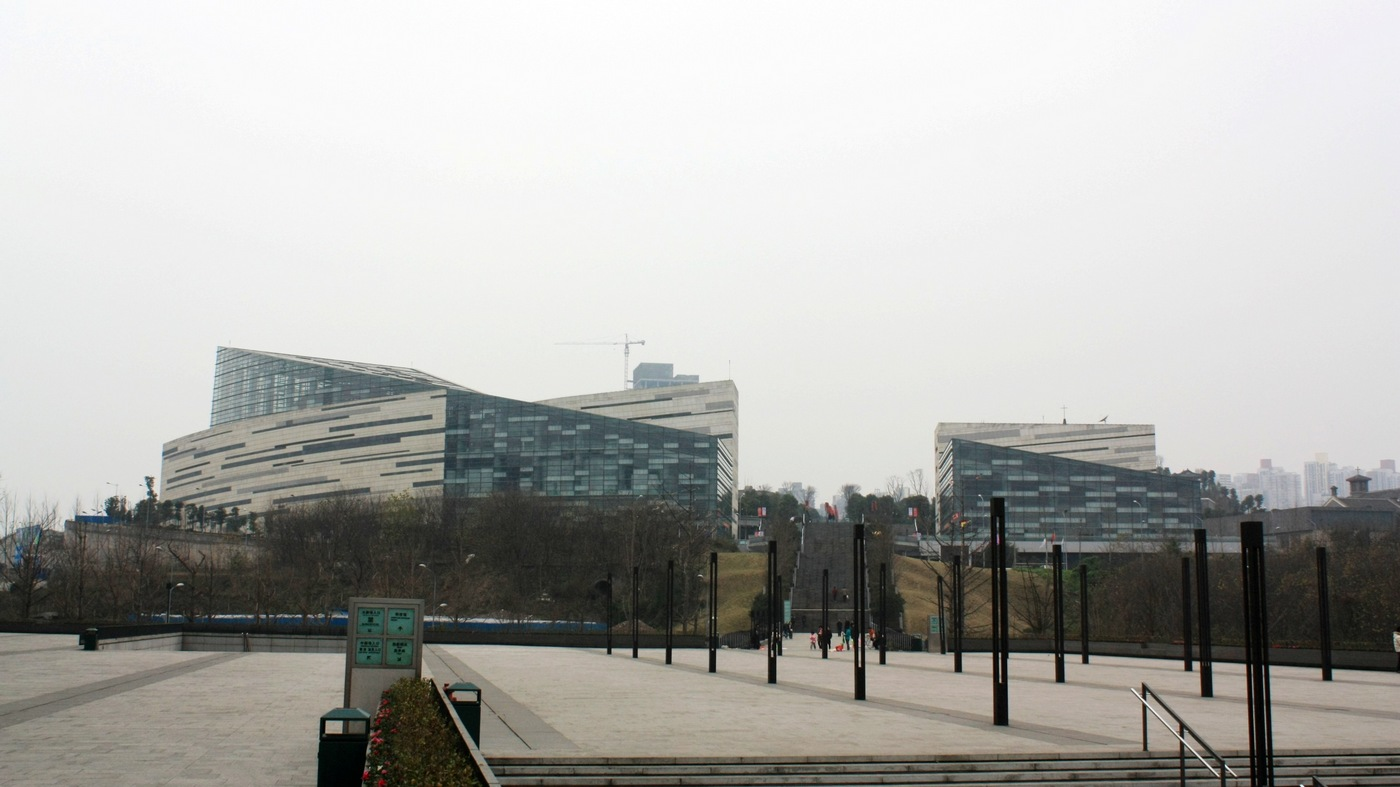
Chongqing Science and Technology Museum, a project of Guida Moseley Brown Architects

== People ==
As of present, the firm employs around thirty people, with three partners and four associates at the helm. Current partners and associates are: Harold Guida LFRAIA AIA, Paul Mutton RAIA, John Guida RAIA, Andrew Donnelly, William Gardner RAIA, Gayatri Pathare and Damian Roos.

== Controversies ==
Due to the 2014 shootings at Parliament Hill, Ottawa, the Australian Senate investigated their own security over at the Federal Parliament. After the investigation, the senate approved of a 2.6 metre steel fence to be developed and designed by Guida Moseley Brown Architects. While the entire security upgrade cost A$60 million, the Australian Institute of Architects lobbied against the plan and suggested that it was "undemocratic and ill-considered", despite having not viewed the design or consulted with the architect, relying largely on media reporting for their information. Canberra architect, Rodney Moss said that adding these fences will compromise the intent of the design which is the opposite to the way that the building was envisaged. The Australian Institute of Architects later consulted with the architect and withdrew their objections having seen the design.

== Awards ==
Since its inception, Guida Moseley Brown Architects have been recognized with over 250 awards for its contribution to the field of architecture and design, both locally and internationally. In 2009, Mr Guida was bestowed the status of Life Fellow of the Royal Australian Institute of Architects, and was also awarded the President's Medal in 2018. The firm has also been commended multiple times for its involvement and support to the environment and sustainability.
