= Grand Theater station =

Grand Theater station may refer to several metro stations in China:

- Grand Theater station (Chongqing Rail Transit)
- Grand Theater station (Shenzhen Metro)
- Guangzhou Opera House station
