= Yulu station =

Chongqing Rail Transit station

Yulu 渝鲁
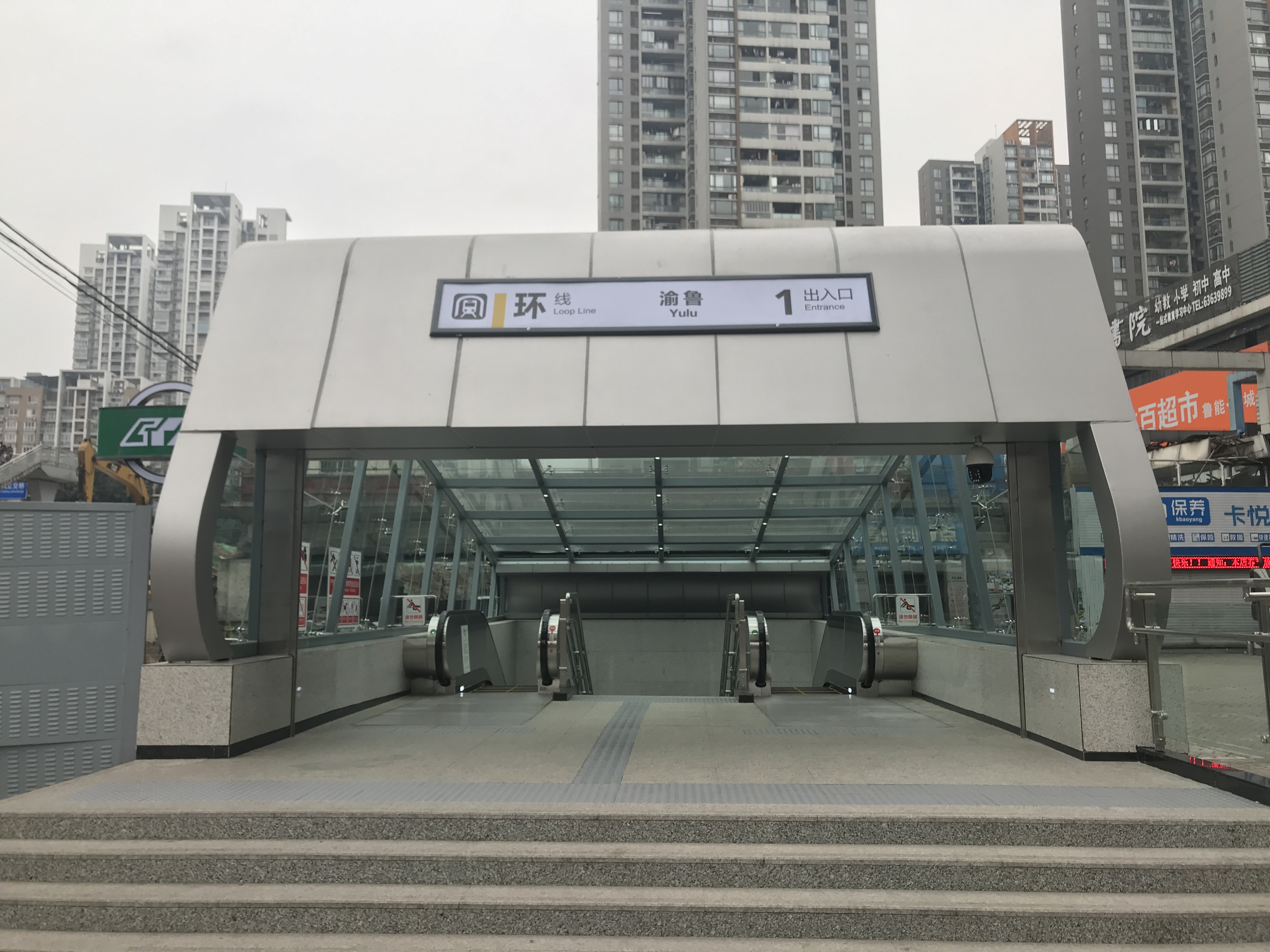

General information
- Location: Chongqing; China
- Coordinates: 29°35′54″N 106°33′22″E
- Operated by: Chongqing Rail Transit Corp., Ltd
- Line: Loop line
- Platforms: 2 (1 island platform)

Construction
- Structure type: Underground

Other information
- Station code: 环/16

History
- Opened: 28 December 2018; 7 years ago

Services
Preceding station	Chongqing Rail Transit	Following station
Chongqing N. Station S. Square Counter-clockwise	Loop line	Wulidian Clockwise
Location

Yulu Station is a station on Loop line of Chongqing Rail Transit in Chongqing municipality, China. It is located in Jiangbei District and opened in 2018.
