= Jiangbeicheng station =

Chongqing Rail Transit station

Jiangbeicheng 江北城
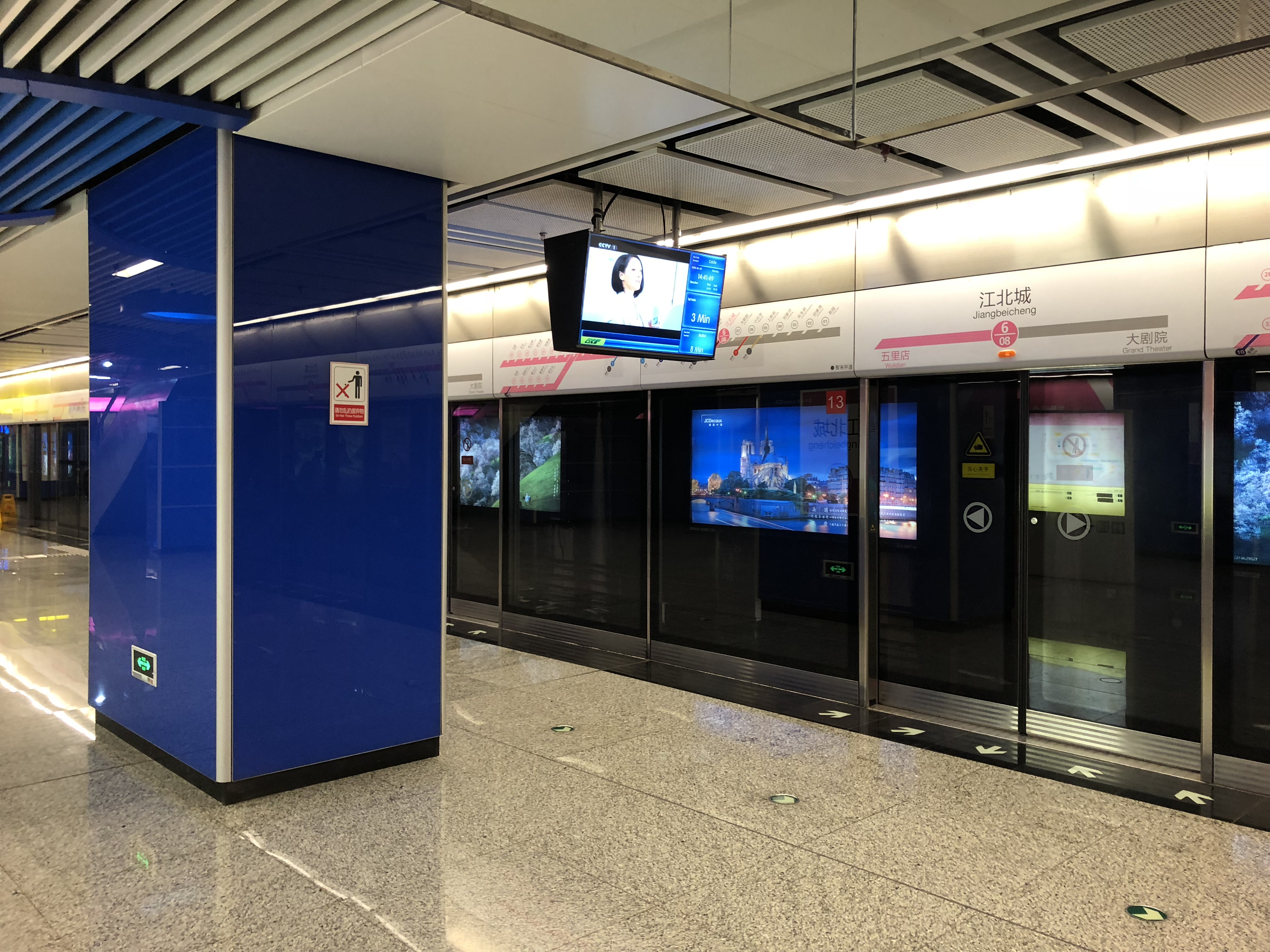
- Platform of Line 6

General information
- Location: Chongqing; China
- Operated by: Chongqing Rail Transit Corp., Ltd
- Lines: Line 6 Line 9
- Platforms: 4 (2 island platforms)

Construction
- Structure type: Underground

Other information
- Station code: / /

History
- Opened: 28 January 2016; 10 years ago (Line 6); 25 January 2022; 4 years ago (Line 9)

Services
Preceding station	Chongqing Rail Transit	Following station
Grand Theater towards Chayuan	Line 6	Wulidian towards Beibei
Liujiatai towards Gaotanyan	Line 9	Wulidian towards Huashigou
Location

Jiangbeicheng is a station on Line 6 and Line 9 of Chongqing Rail Transit in Chongqing Municipality, China, which opened in 2016. It is located in Jiangbei District.

== Station structure ==
An opposite direction cross-platform interchange is provided between Line 6 and Line 9.

B3; Concourse	Exits, Customer service, Vending machines
B4; Platforms	Line 6 to Chayuan (Grand Theater)
B4; Platforms	Island platform
B4; Platforms	Line 9 to Huashigou (Wulidian)
B5; Platforms	Line 6 to Beibei (Wulidian)
B5; Platforms	Island platform
B5; Platforms	Line 9 to Gaotanyan (Liujiatai)
