= Running Man China season 3 =

Running Man China
- Season 3
- Poster for Season 3
- No. of episodes: 12

Release
- Original network: ZRTG: Zhejiang Television
- Original release: October 30, 2015 – January 15, 2016

Season chronology
- ← Previous; Season 2 Next → Season 4

This is a list of episodes of the Chinese variety show Running Man in season 3. The show airs on ZRTG: Zhejiang Television.

== Episodes ==
List of episodes (episode 28–39)
(Series) Episode #	(Season) Episode #	Broadcast Date	Guest(s)	Landmark	Teams		Mission	Result
28	3/01	October 30, 2015	No Guests	(Luoyang, Henan)	One Year Anniversary Special; Fairchild; Luhan; Killer; Deng Chao, Li Chen, Zheng Kai, Wong Cho Lam, Chen He, Angelababy	Final Mission Team Mission	Fairchild; Rip off the killers' nametags Killers; Complete the task and rip off the fairchild's nametag Final Mission; With 66 Luoyang citizens, jump rope 10 times on a single rope	One Year Anniversary Special Episode; Killer Wins; Final Mission; Everyone Wins
29	3/02	November 6, 2015	Amber Kuo, Joe Chen, Ma Su, Song Jia, Zhang Huiwen	(Luoyang, Henan)	‘Working is Best' Competition; Deng Chao, Angelababy; Li Chen, Joe Chen; Wong Cho-lam, Ma Su; Zheng Kai, Amber Kuo; Chen He, Song Jia; Luhan, Zhang Huiwen		Find all tickets to complete a trip from Luoyang to Beijing and put it in the team's safe house	Wong Cho-Lam, Ma Su Wins; The pink team wins a mini model truck and an "R" badge; other teams win the "Three Family Items"
30	3/03	November 13, 2015 (28 September 2015)	Wang Tai Li, Xiao Yang (Chopstick Brothers), Wu Mochou, Xiao Ya Xuan	Shenzhen Bay Sports Center (Shen Zhen, Guangdong)	Idol-day Mission Battle; MEN IN BLACK; Deng Chao, Wang Cho Lam, Lu Han, Xiao Yaxuan, Xiao Yang, Wang Tai Li; A Block of White; Li Chen, Zheng Kai, Chen He, Angelababy, Wu Mo Cho	Final Task; Jury; Wang Cho Lam, Chen He, Wang Tai Li; MEN IN BLACK; Deng Chao, Lu Han, Xiao Yaxuan, Xiao Yang; A Block of White; Li Chen, Zheng Kai, Angelababy, Wu Mo Cho	Teams perform on stage against each other, and the team with most votes from a jury of 2000 spectators wins.	MEN IN BLACK Wins; Both teams get a trophy and a gold badge. Note:Yi Yi emceed.
31	3/04	November 20, 2015 (30 September 2015)	Xie Na	(Shen Zhen, Guangdong)	Deng Chao, Chen He; Li Chen, Lu Han; Wang Cho Lam, Angelababy; Zheng Kai, Xie Na			Xie Na and Wang Cho Lam Wins. Each of them receives a laptop and the other members receive a gold badge
32	3/05	November 27, 2015 (11 October 2015)	Huang Bo, Ruby Lin, Xia Yu	(Luoyang, Henan)	Deng Chao, Ruby Lin; Li Chen, Xia Yu; Wong Cho Lam, Chen He; Zheng Kai, Luhan; Angelababy, Huang Bo			Angelababy & Huang Bo Wins Both received a "R" Badge and a pair of chopstick and a spoon. Angelababy gave her "R" Badge and chopsticks and spoon gift to Ruby Lin and Xia Yu respectively.
33	3/06	December 4, 2015 (14 October 2015)	Ella Chen(S.H.E), Feng Shaofeng, Liu Yan	(Xi'an, Shaanxi)	Family Group; Deng Chao, Li Chen, Wong Cho Lam, Zheng Kai, Luhan, Angelababy, Feng Shaofeng, Liu Yan; Outsiders Pair; Chen He, Ella Chen			The ending carries onto the next episode.
34	3/07	December 11, 2015 (14 October 2015)	Ella Chen(S.H.E), Feng Shaofeng, Liu Yan	(Xianyang, Shaanxi)	Family Group; Deng Chao, Li Chen, Wong Cho Lam, Zheng Kai, Luhan, Angelababy, Feng Shaofeng, Liu Yan; Outsiders Pair; Chen He, Ella Chen			The family group wins. 8 members of the family group each received a tiger head gold ring. Deng Chao gave his to Ella.
35	3/08	December 18, 2015 (25 October 2015)	Sun Li	(Nanjing)	Initial Teams; Green Team; Luhan, Li Chen, Chen He, Sun Li; Orange Team; Angelababy, Zheng Kai, Wong Cho Lam, Deng Chao	Final Angels Teams; White Angels; Li Chen, Wong Cho Lam, Zheng Kai, Angelababy, Sun Li (Queen); Black Angels; Chen He, Deng Chao, Luhan		White Angels Wins
36	3/09	December 25, 2015 (7 November 2015)	Yang Mi	(Haikou, Hainan)	Deng Chao, Li Chen, Wong Cho Lam, Chen He, Zheng Kai, Luhan, Angelababy, Yang Mi			Chen He Wins
37	3/10	January 1, 2016 (9 November 2015)	Wang Baoqiang	(Nanjing)	Deng Chao, Li Chen, Wong Cho Lam, Chen He, Zheng Kai, Luhan, Angelababy, Wang Baoqiang			The Family group Wins
38	3/11	January 8, 2016 (23 November 2015)	Bea Hayden, He Sui, Leanne Li, Lynn Hung, Zhang Lanxin	(Melbourne, Australia)	Australia's Star Pairs'; Deng Chao, Angelababy; He Sui, Chen He; Lynn Hung, Zheng Kai; Wong Cho Lam, Leanne Li; Li Chen, Bea Hayden; Zhang Lanxin, Luhan			Lynn Hung & Zheng Kai Wins
39	3/12	January 15, 2016 (25 November 2015)	No Guests	(Adelaide, Australia)	Battle of the Strongest 3 No Teams		Defeat the other members to be deemed the best of Running Man for Season 3	Chen He Wins; Receives magic wand, gold prize and best player trophy for Season 3.
