= Danzishi station =

Metro station in Chongqing, China

Danzishi 弹子石
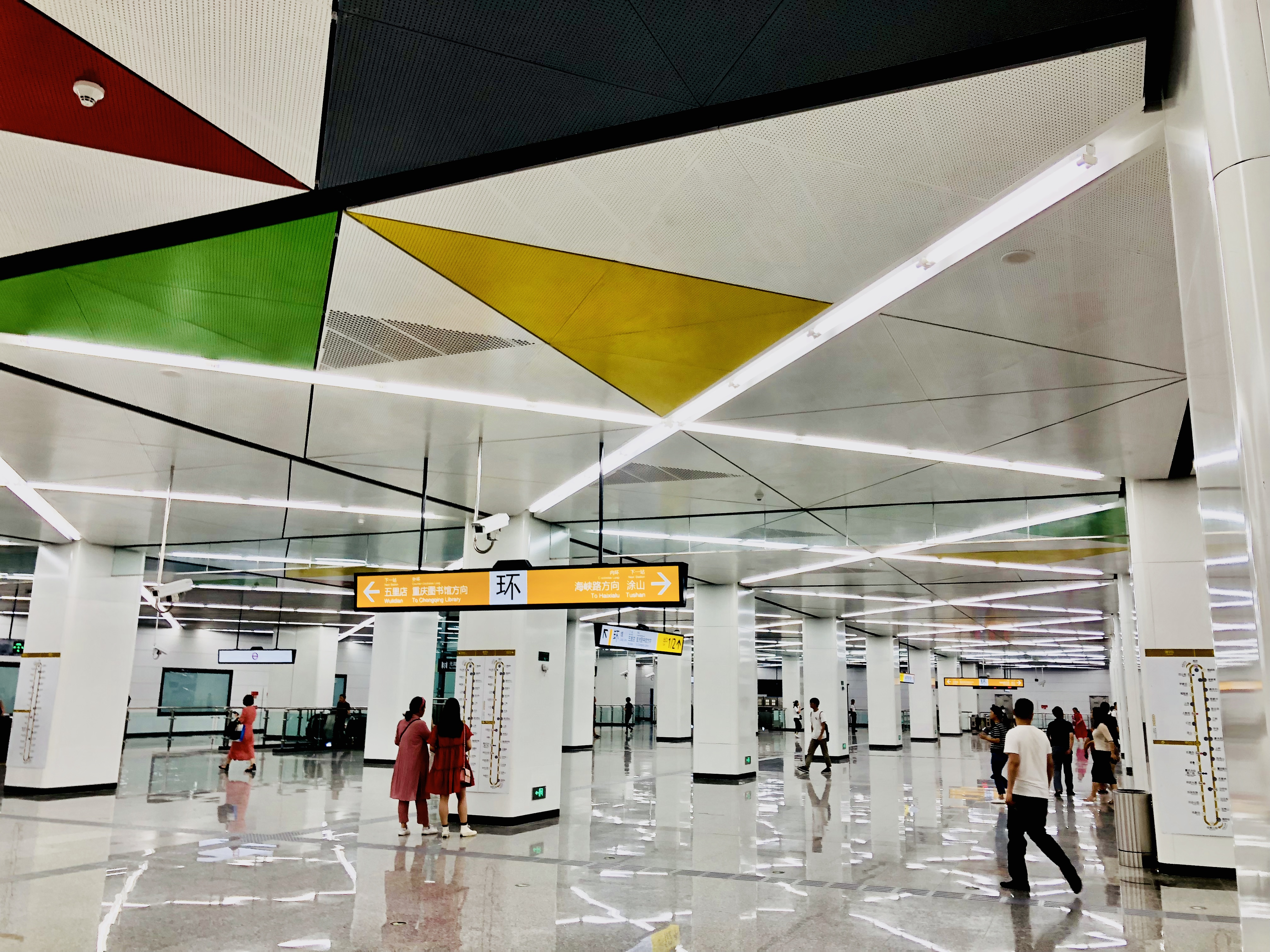
- Station Concourse

General information
- Location: Chongqing; China
- Coordinates: 29.58863°N 106.58953°E
- Operated by: Chongqing Rail Transit Corp., Ltd
- Line: Loop line
- Platforms: 2 (2 side platforms)

Construction
- Structure type: At-grade and underground
- Accessible: 3 accessible elevators (1 under construction)

Other information
- Station code: 0/18

History
- Opened: 1 July 2019

Services
Preceding station	Chongqing Rail Transit	Following station
Wulidian Counter-clockwise	Loop line	Tushan Clockwise
Location

Danzishi is a metro station on the Loop Line of Chongqing Rail Transit in Nan'an District of Chongqing Municipality, China.

It serves the area surrounding the Danzishi CBD, including nearby office buildings and residential blocks.

The station opened on 1 July 2019.

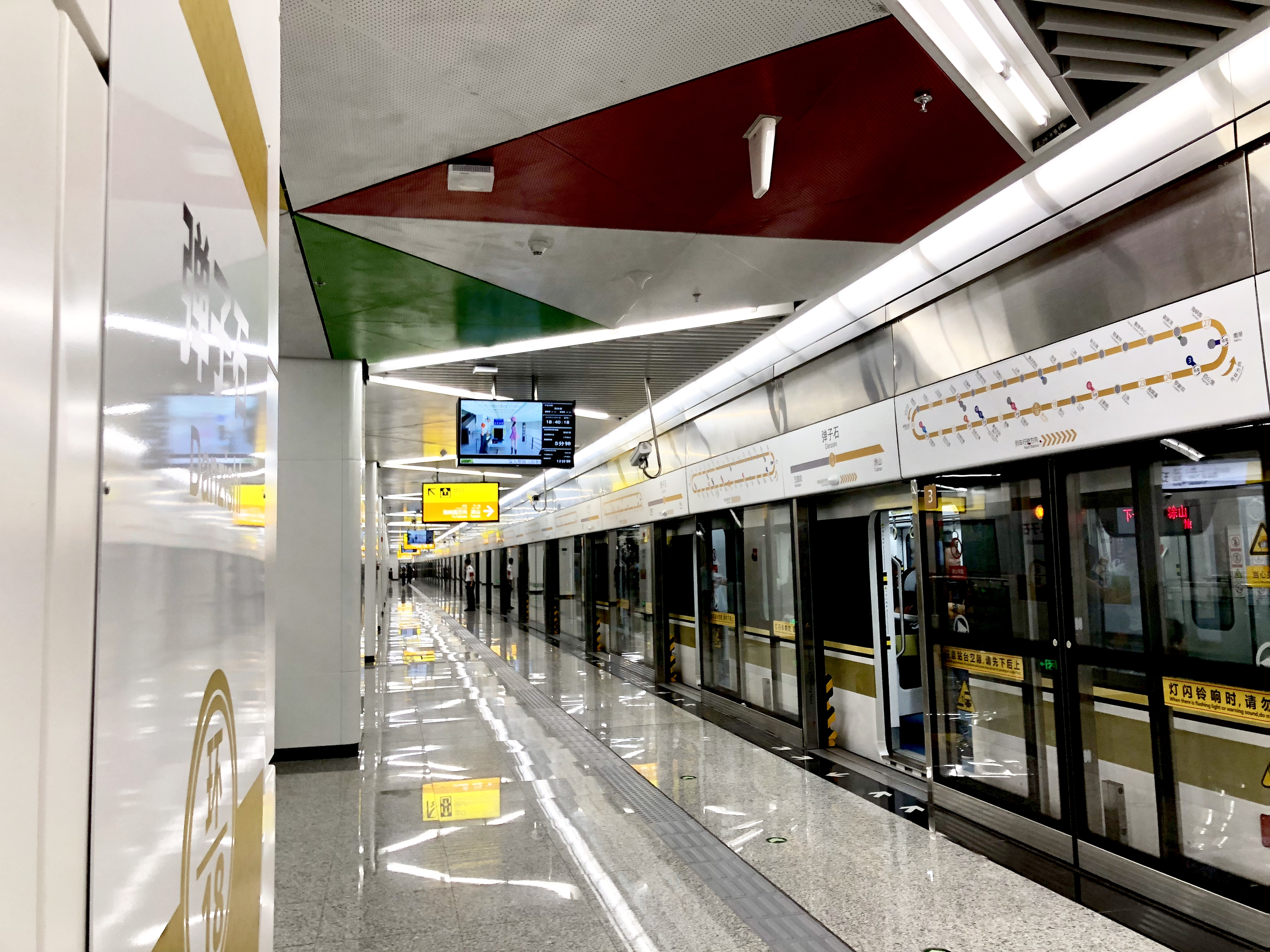
Station Platform

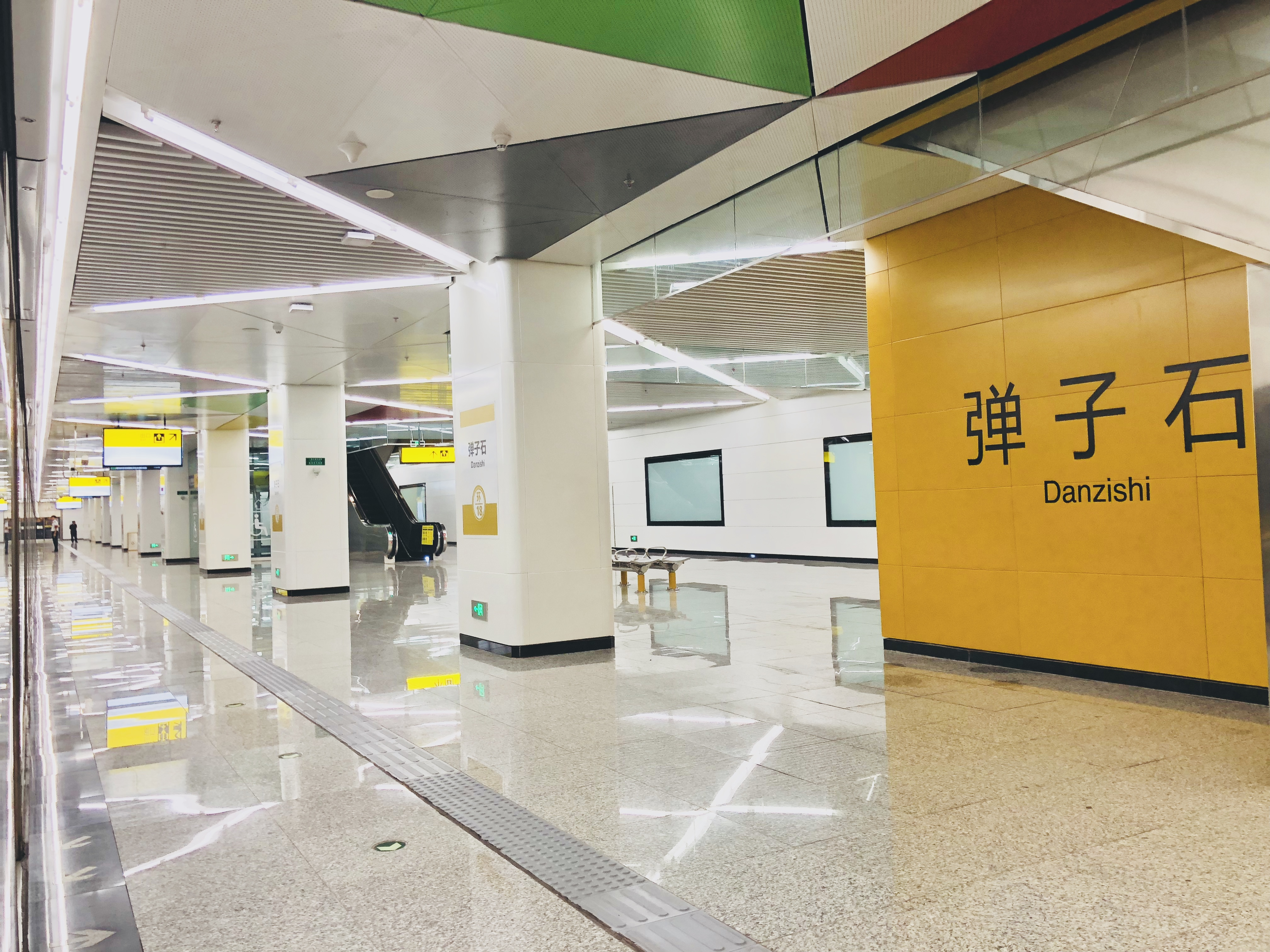
Station Platform

== Station structure ==
=== Floors ===
1F	Above ground	Entrance/Exits, Accessible elavator
	Entrance/Exit passageways	Exit 2
	Entrance/Exit passageways	Exit 3
B1	Loop line Line Station Concourse	Exit 4, Ticket machines, Ticket gates, Customer service center, Accessible elevators
B2	Loop line Line Platforms	Trains
	Interchange Channel	Underpass interchange between platforms

=== Loop Line Platform ===
Platform Layout

2 side platforms are in use for Loop Line trains travelling in both directions.

	Side platform Doors open on the right
To Loop lineChongqing Library	←	0/18	←	Anti-Clockwise Loop
Clockwise Loop	→	0/18	→	To Loop line Haixialu
	Side platform Doors open on the right

== Exits ==
There are a total of four entrances/exits for the station, with Exit 1 currently under construction.

Exit 2 opened with a makeshift passageway due to construction setbacks on the actual exit.

Exit	To
2	Tenglong Avenue, Chaotianmen Bridge
3	Qunhui Road, Weiguo South Road
4	Tenglong Avenue, Qunhui Road, Chongqing No.11 Middle School

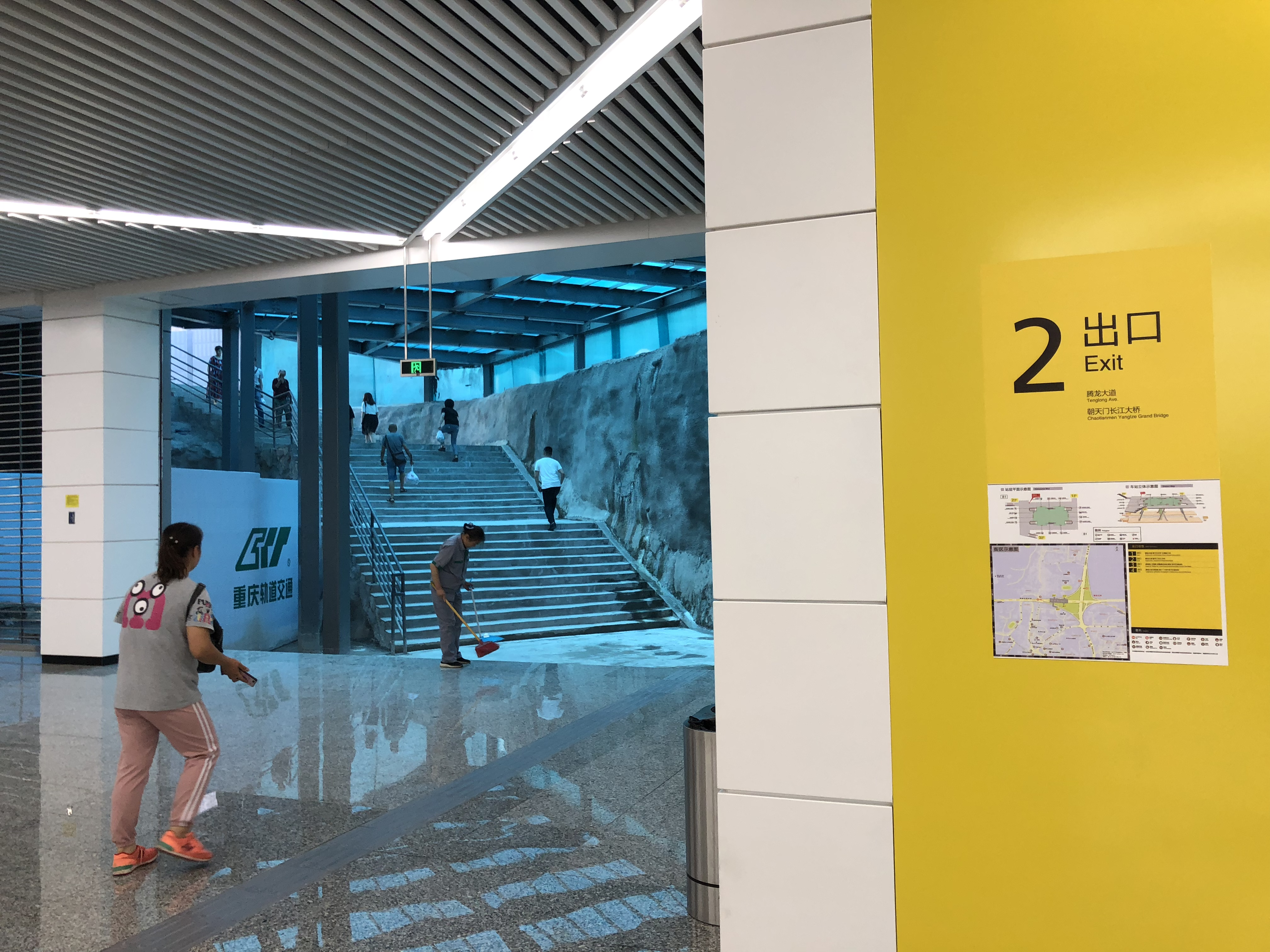
The makeshift passageway temporarily substituting the actual Exit 2

== Surroundings ==
=== Nearby places ===
- Chaotianmen Bridge
- Danzishi Middle School
- Chongqing No.11 Middle School
- Dafoduan Primary School
- Tenglong Avenue
- Qunhui Road
- Weiguo Road

=== Nearby stations ===
- Tushan station (a Loop Line station)
- Wulidian station (a Loop Line & Line 6 station)

== See also ==
- Chongqing Rail Transit (CRT)
- Loop Line (CRT)
- Chaotianmen Bridge
