= Tushan station =

Chongqing Rail Transit station

Tushan 涂山
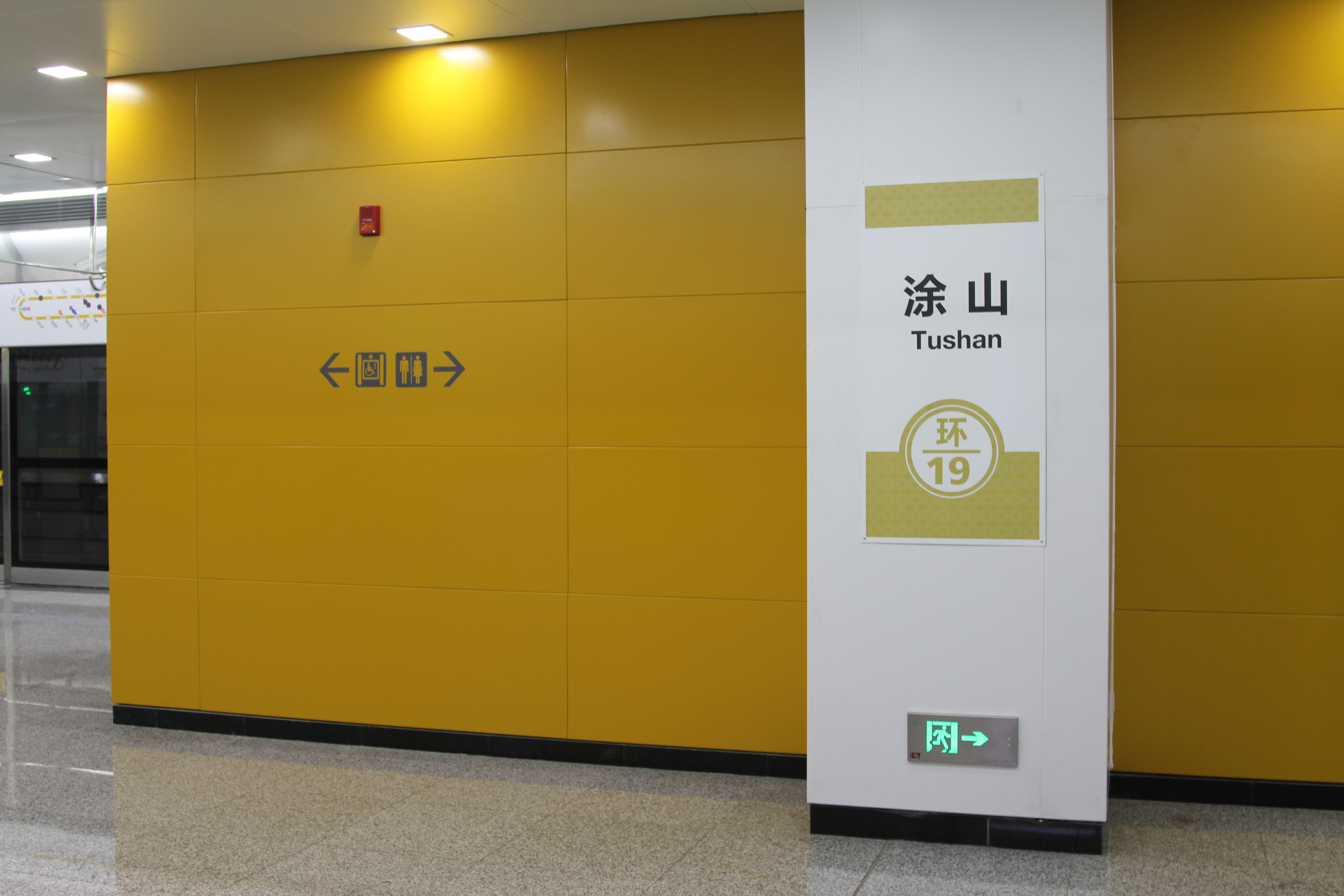

General information
- Location: Chongqing; China
- Operated by: Chongqing Rail Transit Corp., Ltd
- Line: Loop line
- Platforms: 4 (2 island platforms)

Construction
- Structure type: Underground

Other information
- Station code: 环/19

History
- Opened: 28 December 2018

Services
Preceding station	Chongqing Rail Transit	Following station
Danzishi Counter-clockwise	Loop line	Renji Clockwise
Location

Tushan Station is a station on the Loop line of Chongqing Rail Transit in Chongqing municipality, China. It is located in Nan'an District and opened in 2018.

There are two island platforms at this station, but only two inner ones are currently in use and the other two outer ones are reserved.
