= Running Man China season 2 =

Running Man China
- Season 2
- Poster for Season 2
- No. of episodes: 12

Release
- Original network: ZRTG: Zhejiang Television
- Original release: April 17 – July 3, 2015

Season chronology
- ← Previous; Season 1 Next → Season 3

This is a list of episodes of the Chinese variety show Running Man in season 2. The show airs on ZRTG: Zhejiang Television.

== Episodes ==
List of episodes (episode 16–27)
| (Series) Episode # | (Season) Episode # | Broadcast Date | Guest(s) | Landmark | Teams | | Mission | Result |
|---|---|---|---|---|---|---|---|---|
| 16 | 2/01 | April 17, 2015 (March 9, 2015) | Fan Bingbing, Han Geng | Chengdu International Financial Center (Chengdu, Sichuan) | Knights of the Zodiac; Yellow Team (Deng Chao, Wong Cho-lam, Zheng Kai, Fan Bingbing, Han Geng); Blue Team (Li Chen, Angelababy, Chen He, Bao Bei'er) | | Defeat the other team | Yellow Team Wins; Yellow Team receives Athena Cloth and 6 gold laurel wreaths, which one is given to Angelababy. |
| 17 | 2/02 | April 24, 2015 (March 11, 2015) | Huang Xiaoming | Cymbidium Hangzhou High School (Hangzhou, Zhejiang) | Jailbreak Mission; Running Man Team (Deng Chao, Chen He, Bao Bei'er, Angelababy, Li Chen); Huang Xiaoming Team (Huang Xiaoming, Zheng Kai, Wong Cho-lam) | | Escape building in two hours or before everyone is eliminated | Running Man Team Wins; Each member receives a gold bar. |
| 18 | 2/03 | May 1, 2015 (March 13, 2015) | Ou Di, Song Jia | Zhejiang Provincial Television Broadcasting Building (Hangzhou, Zhejiang) | Mahjong Battle; Magic Math Sect (Deng Chao, Wong Cho-lam, Bao Bei'er); Magic Touch Sect (Zheng Kai, Angelababy, Ou Di); Magic Shuffle Sect (Li Chen, Chen He, Song Jia) | | Complete the Mahjong Set | Magic Shuffle Sect Wins; Each member receives a ring. |
| 19 | 2/04 | May 8, 2015 (March 25, 2015) | Aarif Lee, Jiang Jingfu, Lay (EXO), Lin Gengxin, Ye Zuxin | Zhejiang Provincial Television Broadcasting Building (Hangzhou, Zhejiang) | Flower Boys Team (Angelababy, Lin Gengxin, Lay, Aarif Lee, Ye Zuxin, Jiang Jinfu); Uncle Team (Deng Chao, Bao Bei'er, Li Chen, Chen He, Wong Cho-lam, Zheng Kai) | | Defeat the other team | Uncle Team Wins; Each member receives a golden rose which they give to the Flower Boys Team. |
| 20 | 2/05 | May 15, 2015 (March 27, 2015) | Du Chun, Joe Chen, Nicky Wu | Hengdian World Studios (Dongyang, Jinhua, Zhejiang) | Brocade Guard (Chen He, Li Chen, Zheng Kai, Joe Chen, Nicky Wu (spy)); Eastern Depot (Deng Chao, Bao Bei'er, Wong Cho-lam, Du Chun, Angelababy (spy)) | | Find all 4 gold plaques | Brocade Guard Wins; Members of Brocade Guard and their spy in Eastern Depot each receive a gold bar. |
| 21 | 2/06 | May 22, 2015 (April 10, 2015) | Dong Chengpeng, Jike Junyi, Jam Hsiao, Shin, Yao Chen | Guangzhou Library (Tianhe, Guangzhou, Guangdong) | X Music Hunt; Deng Chao Team (Deng Chao, Dong Chengpeng, Jike Junyi); Jam Hsiao Team (Jam Hsiao, Zheng Kai, Wong Cho-lam); Shin Team (Shin, Angelababy, Chen He); Yao Chen Team (Yao Chen, Li Chen, Bao Bei'er) | | Find 26 numbers to solve the mystery song | Jam Hsiao Team and Li Chen Win; Each receive a gold "R" badge which Li Chen gives to Yao Chen. |
| 22 | 2/07 | May 29, 2015 (April 12, 2015) | Liu Tao | Guangdong Science Center (Panyu, Guangzhou, Guangdong) | Saving Giant Babies; Li Chen Team (Li Chen, Bao Bei'er, Chen He, Liu Tao); Deng Chao Team (Deng Chao, Angelababy, Zheng Kai, Wong Cho-lam) | | Find four correct color balls | Li Chen Team Wins; Each receive a gold lollipop and get to "change" back to adults. |
| 23 | 2/08 | June 5, 2015 (April 21, 2015) | No Guests | Beijing Capital International Airport Terminal 3 (Chaoyang, Beijing) | Traitor of Traitors (Li Chen, Angelababy, Chen He, Zheng Kai, Wong Cho-lam, Bao Bei'er); Traitor (Deng Chao) | | Fool Deng Chao until the end of recording | Li Chen, Angelababy, Chen He, Zheng Kai, Wong Cho-lam and Bao Bei'er Win; Winners receive a giant plane model. Deng Chao receive a small plane model. |
| 24 | 2/09 | June 12, 2015 (April 23, 2015) | Ada Choi, Huo Siyan, Jiang Xin, Jiang Yiyan, Rain Lee | Changyou Building (Shijingshan, Beijing) | Sassy Girlfriends; Orange Team (Zheng Kai, Angelababy); Green Team (Li Chen, Huo Siyan); Blue Team (Deng Chao, Jiang Yiyan); Yellow Team (Chen He, Jiang Xin); Purple Team (Wong Cho-lam, Ada Choi); Gold Team (Bao Bei'er, Rain Lee) | | Defeat the other teams | Purple Team Wins; Obtain two jade pendants and an "R" badge. |
| 25 | 2/10 | June 19, 2015 (April 25, 2015) | Bai Baihe, Jing Boran, Wallace Chung | Gubei Water Town (Miyun, Beijing) | Nanyang Merchants (Chen He, Bao Bei'er, Wallace Chung, Bai Baihe, Jing Boran); Xiyu Merchants (Deng Chao, Li Chen, Angelababy, Zheng Kai, Wong Cho-lam) | No Teams | Obtain keys and defeat the other members | Nanyang Merchants Win; Nanyang Merchants receives the goods of both Nanyang and Xiyu Merchants. Also, for being the last person standing, Bai Baihe receives a gold "R" badge. |
| 26 | 2/11 | June 26, 2015 (May 5, 2015) | Liu Yan, Tiffany Tang | Saipan (Saipan, Northern Mariana Islands) | Happy Vacation? Nightmare Vacation? Yellow Team (Deng Chao, Bao Bei'er, Liu Yan); Red Team (Li Chen, Wong Cho-lam, Tiffany Tang); Blue Team (Chen He, Zheng Kai, Angelababy) | | Have the most USD left after one day | Red Team Wins; Each receives a gold prize. They also get to enjoy BBQ food which they share with other teams. |
| 27 | 2/12 | July 3, 2015 (May 6, 2015) | No Guests | Saipan (Saipan, Northern Mariana Islands) | Battle of the Strongest 2 No Teams | | Defeat the other members to be deemed the best of Running Man China for Season 2 | Zheng Kai Wins; Receives trophy and gold bar. |
