= Wulidian station =

Metro station in Chongqing, China

Wulidian 五里店
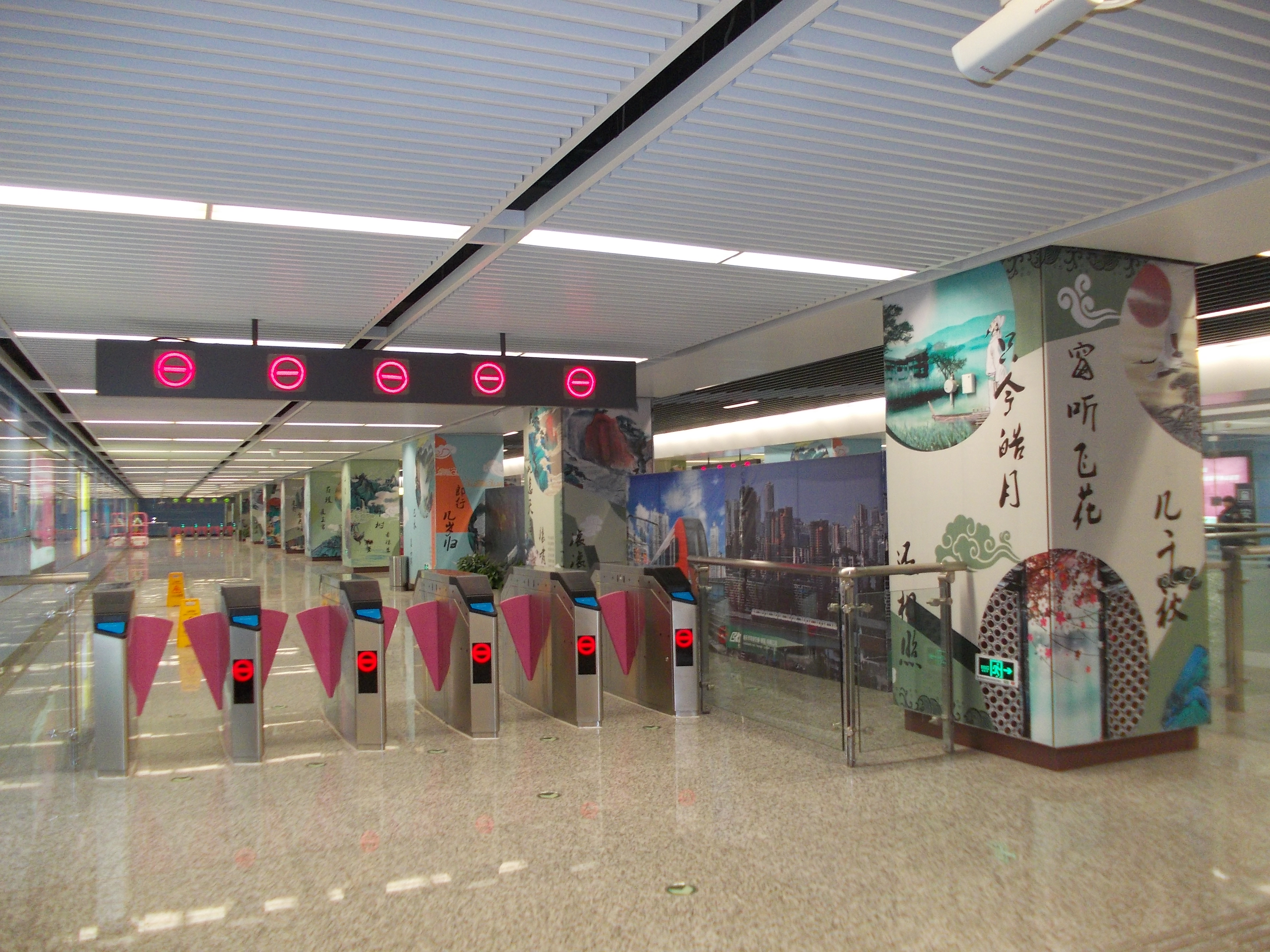

General information
- Location: Chongqing; China
- Operated by: Chongqing Rail Transit Corp., Ltd
- Lines: Line 6 Line 9 Loop line
- Platforms: 6 (3 island platforms)

Construction
- Structure type: Underground

Other information
- Station code: / / /

History
- Opened: 28 September 2012; 13 years ago (Line 6); 28 December 2018; 7 years ago (Loop line); 25 January 2022; 4 years ago (Line 9)

Services
Preceding station	Chongqing Rail Transit	Following station
Jiangbeicheng towards Chayuan	Line 6	Hongtudi towards Beibei
Jiangbeicheng towards Gaotanyan	Line 9	Gailanxi towards Huashigou
Yulu Counter-clockwise	Loop line	Danzishi Clockwise
Location

Wulidian is a station on Line 6, Line 9, and the Loop line of Chongqing Rail Transit in Chongqing Municipality, China. It is located in the Jiangbei District. It opened in 2012.

== Station structure ==
=== Line 6 and Loop line ===
B1; Concourse	Exits 1-4, Customer service, Vending machines, Transfer passage to Line 9
B2; Platforms	Loop line counterclockwise loop (Yulu)
B2; Platforms	Island platform
B2; Platforms	Loop line clockwise loop (Danzishi)
B3; Platforms	Line 6 to Beibei (Hongtudi)
B3; Platforms	Island platform
B3; Platforms	Line 6 to Chayuan (Jiangbeicheng)

=== Line 9 ===
B1; Concourse	Exits 5-8, Customer service, Vending machines, Transfer passage to Line 6 and Loop line
B2; Platforms	Line 9 to Gaotanyan (Jiangbeicheng)
B2; Platforms	Island platform
B2; Platforms	Line 9 to Huashigou (Gailanxi)

== Gallery ==
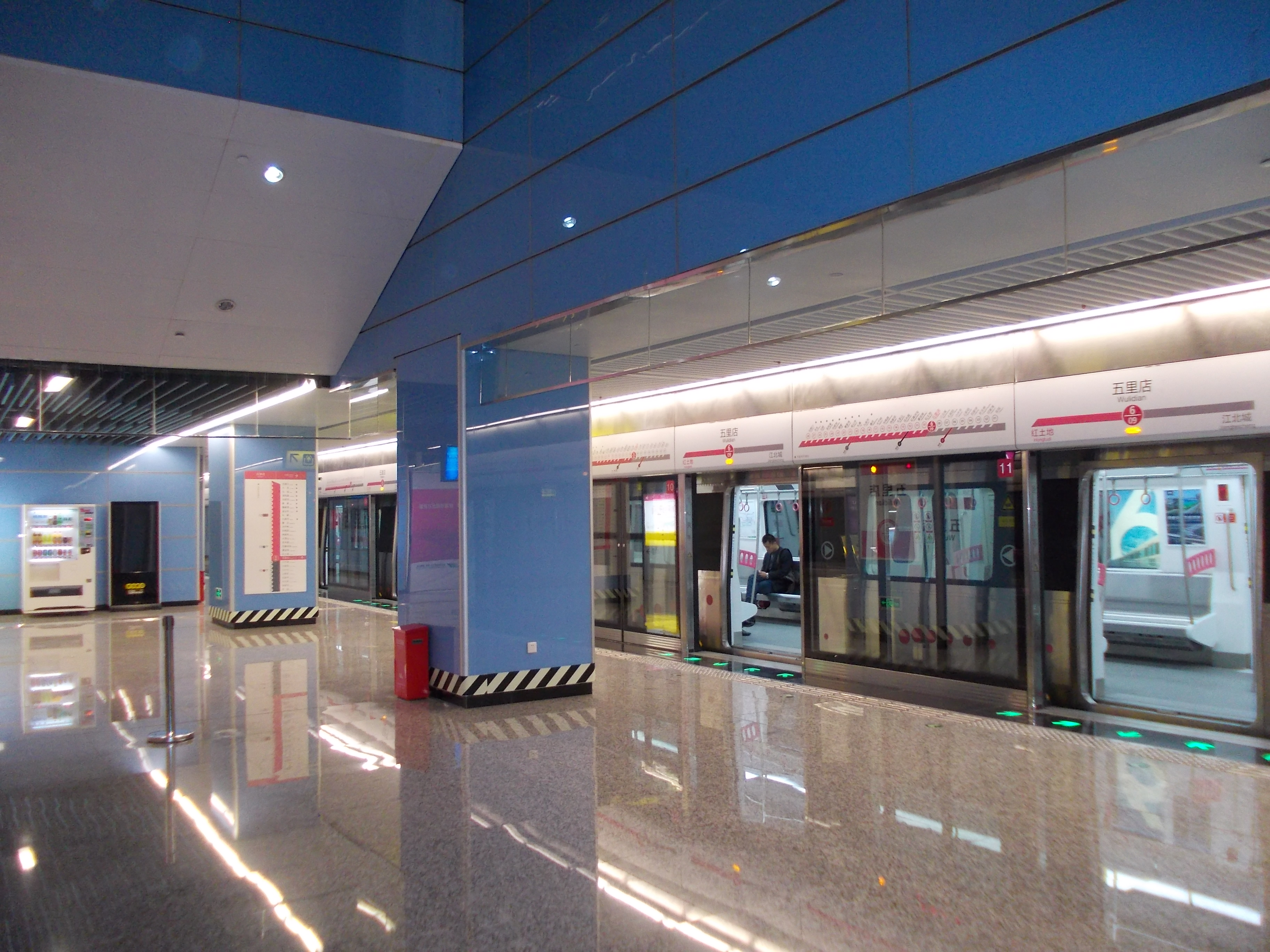
Platform of Line 6

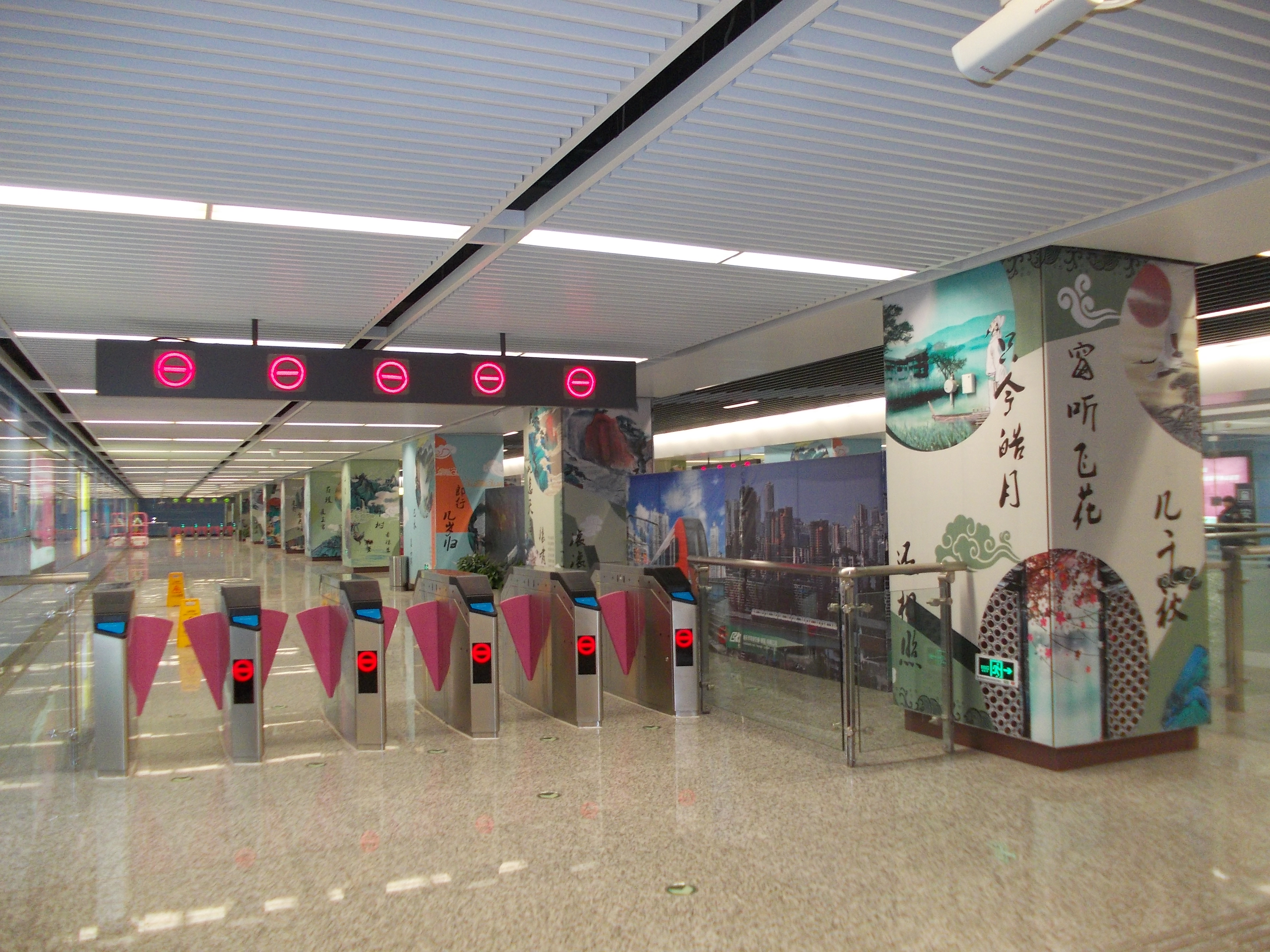
Concourse of both Line 6 and Loop line

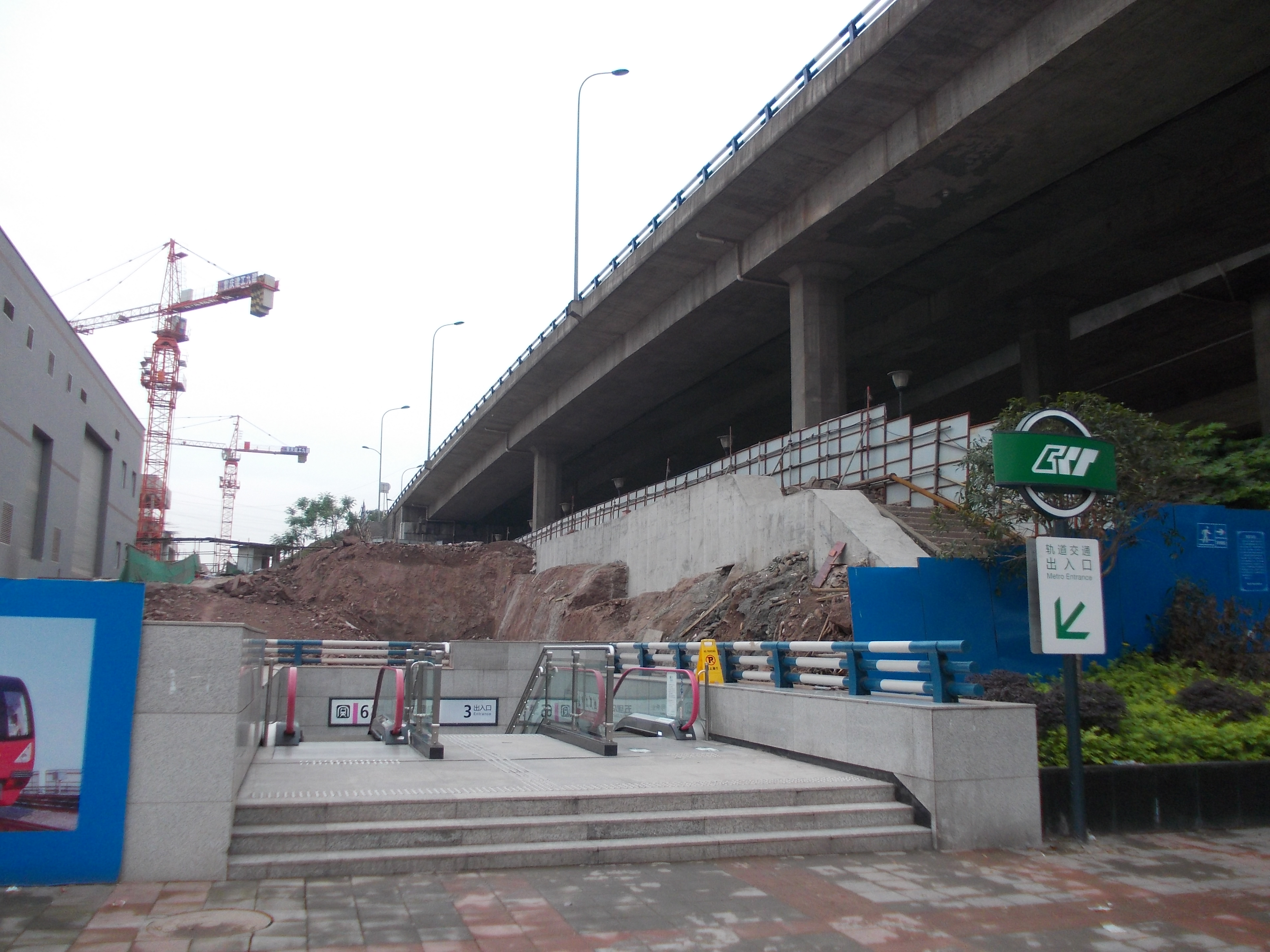
Exit 3
