= Chongqing Science and Technology Museum =

Science museum in Chongqing, China

Coordinates: 29°34′16″N 106°34′40″E

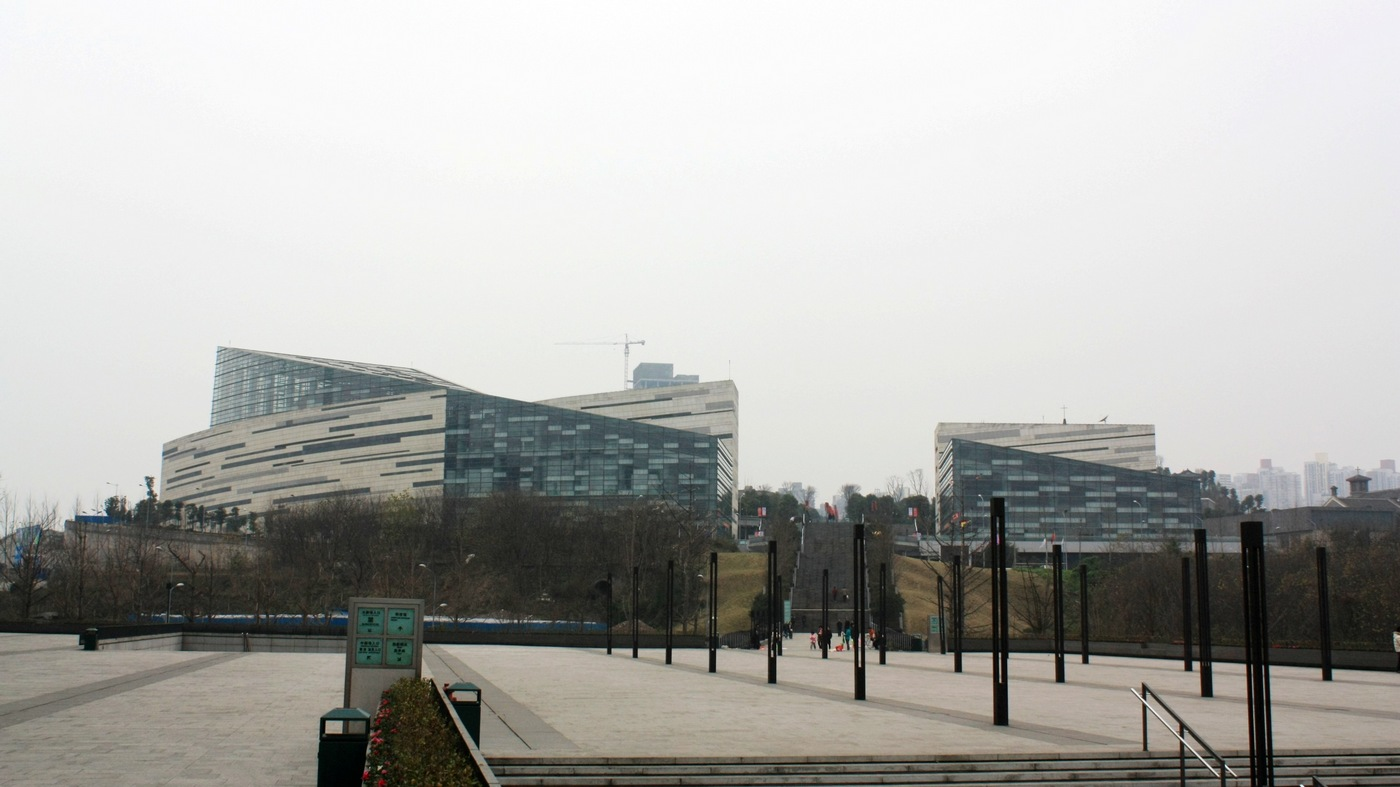
Chongqing Science and Technology Museum

The Chongqing Science and Technology Museum (simplified Chinese: 重庆科技馆; traditional Chinese: 重慶科技館) is a science museum in the Jiangbei District of Chongqing, China.

The ground-breaking ceremony for the museum was held on 7 January 2006 and construction started in October 2006. The museum was opened to the public on 9 September 2009. Guida Moseley Brown Architects were involved in the project. The museum cost 567 million RMB to build. It is on a plot of 37 mu and the building has a floor area of 45,300 m^{2}.

The museum is centrally located in Jiangbeizui CBD, near the Chongqing Grand Theatre and the confluence of the Jialing River and the Yangtze River. It has an IMAX theatre. The museum is free for school children.

== See also ==
- List of museums in China
- Three Gorges Museum
