= Chongqing Grand Theatre =

Chinese performance venue, opened 2009

- 重庆大剧院
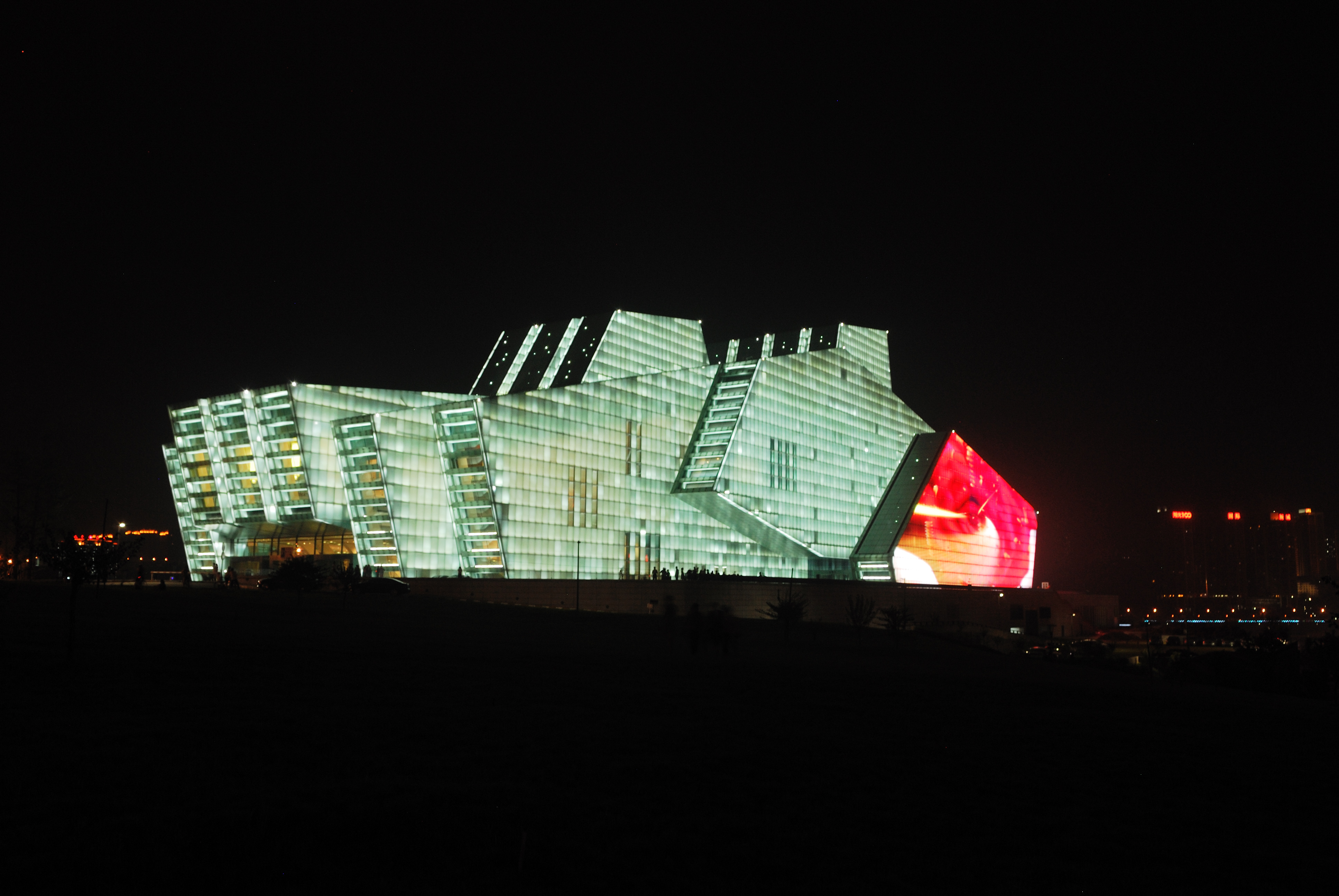
- Chongqing Grand Theatre at night
- Interactive map of the Chongqing Grand Theatre area
- Alternative names: Chongqing Opera House

General information
- Status: Completed
- Location: Confluence of the Yangtze and Jialing Rivers, Jiangbei, Chongqing, China
- Coordinates: 29.568623°N 106.580384°E
- Construction started: 2005
- Completed: 2009
- Cost: 1.595 billion yuan

Height
- Height: 64 metres (210 ft)

Dimensions
- Diameter: 220 metres (720 ft)

Technical details
- Floor count: 7
- Floor area: 103,307 square metres (1,111,990 sq ft)

Design and construction
- Architecture firm: Gmp Architekten

The Chongqing Grand Theatre (or Theater) is a performing arts venue in central Chongqing, People's Republic of China, located overlooking the Yangtze River. The 64-metre six-storey building was constructed from 2005 until 2009. Hassell, a design company, took part in a competition to decide how the building was constructed and laid out. The building contains two concert halls.

== Coliseum ==
The coliseum is a horseshoe shaped auditorium which can accommodate 1826 people, including an 88-member orchestra pit. The coliseum is intended for large-scale opera, ballet, symphony, musicals and other performances.

== Theatre ==
The audience hall is two floors and can accommodate 938 people, plus 65 in the orchestra pit. It is designed for small and medium-sized dance, opera, drama, vocal, small orchestra, chamber music, folk music and other performances.

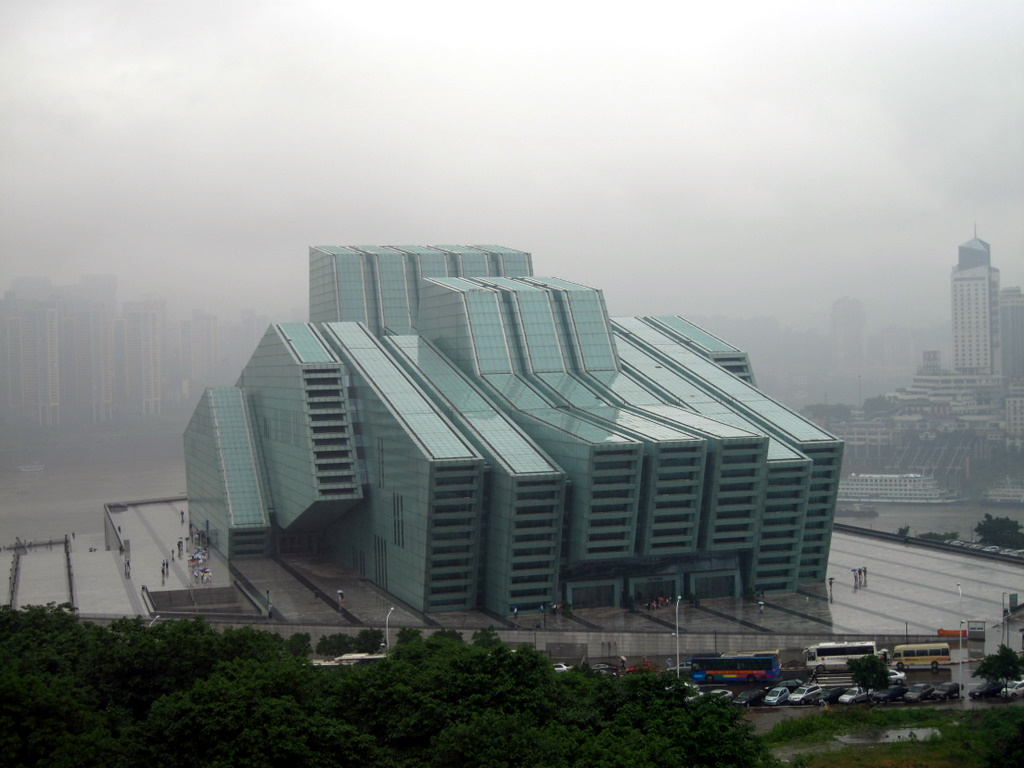
Chongqing Grand Theatre building.

== Performances ==
Since being built the Chongqing Grand Theater has hosted many performances: Shen Wenyu in August 2011; José Carreras on November 1, 2011; Quartet San Francisco on January 11, 2012; Shengyan on February 14, 2012; Phil Chang on March 12, 2012; Winnie Hsin Tour concert on May 13, 2012; Michael Wong on July 14, 2012; Chang Cheng-yue on August 29, 2012; Wangfan on September 9, 2012; Richard Clayderman on December 14, 2012; Bianca Wu on December 15, 2012; Qi Qin on December 24, 2012; Flymen on January 22, 2013; Wu shuang in March 2013; Flautando Kolin Recorder Quartet on March 23, 2013; Johnny Jiang on May 28, 2013; Li Yugang on July 21, 2013.

The design is different from what Hassel envisioned; a mix between a space center and a sailing ship.
