= Jiangbeizui CBD =

Central business district in Chongqing, China

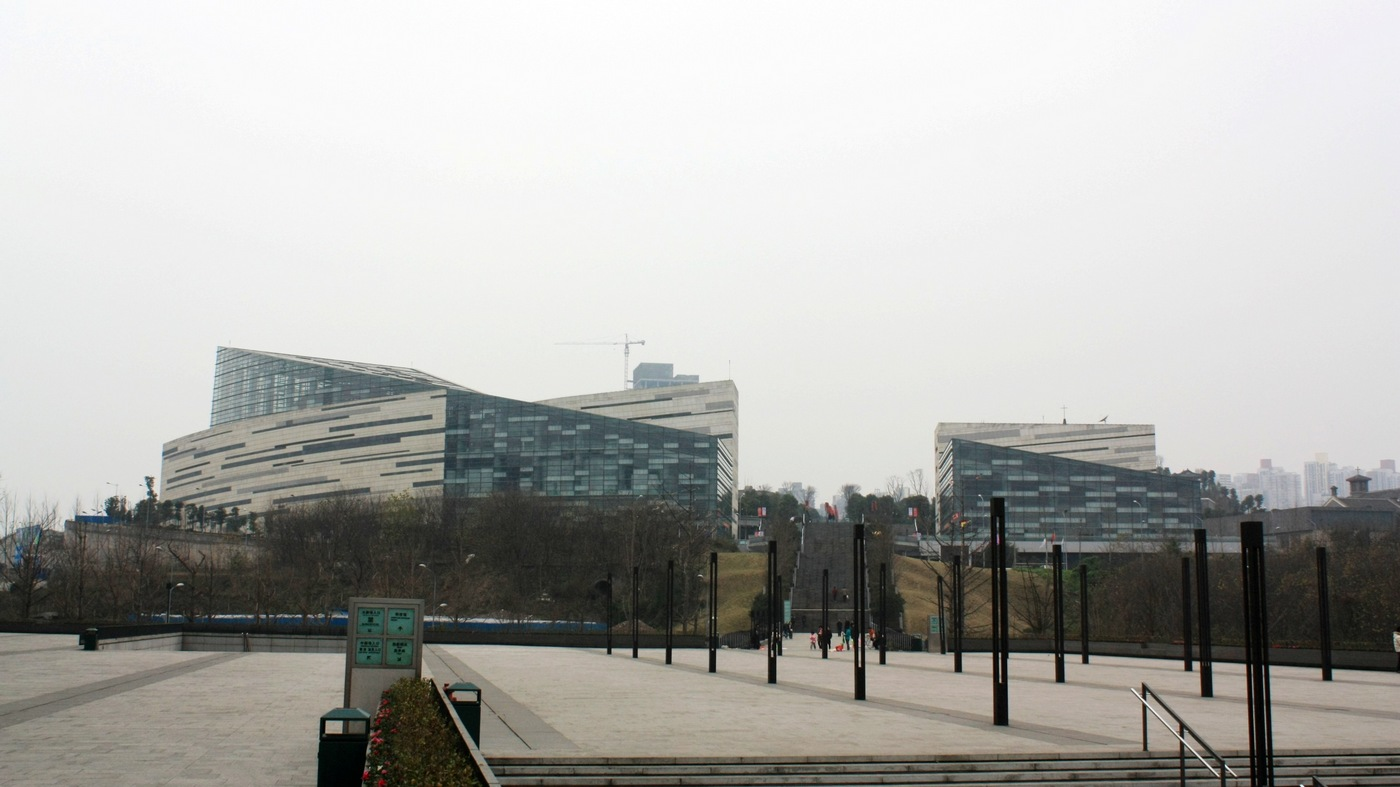
The Chongqing Science & Technology Museum in Jiangbeizui CBD.

Jiangbeizui CBD (Chinese: 江北嘴中央商务区; pinyin: Jiāngběizuǐ Zhōngyāng Shāngwùqū) is one of the central business districts and part of Liangjiang New Area in central Chongqing, China.

The CBD aims to attract financial institutions, making it a financial centre in the future.

Jiangbeizui CBD is located by the Yangtze River, near the confluence with the Jialing River immediately across Chongqing's primary downtown core of Jiefangbei CBD. The world class Chongqing Science and Technology Museum is located here.

== See also ==
- Jiefangbei CBD
