= List of Chinese provincial-level divisions by illiteracy rate =

According to the seventh population census in 2020 the overall literacy rate in the People's Republic of China was 96.74 per cent. In the different regions the illiteracy rate varies considerably, though. The following is a list of the first-level administrative divisions covered in the population census, including all provinces, autonomous regions and municipalities, in order of their officially reported illiteracy rate for people aged 15 and above in 2000, 2010, and 2020.

Figures from censuses conducted in Hong Kong (2021) and Macau (2021) are given for the two special administrative regions; these are not directly comparable as the methodologies used may differ.

== Mainland China ==
Color	Regions of China
	North China
	East China
	Southwestern China
	Northwestern China
	South Central China
	Northeast China

Name	Region	2000	2010	2020
Beijing	North China	4.93%	1.86%	0.89%
Jilin	Northeast China	5.74%	2.18%	1.51%
Liaoning	Northeast China	5.79%	2.18%	1.01%
Guangdong	South Central China	5.17%	2.41%	1.78%
Heilongjiang	Northeast China	6.33%	2.34%	1.53%
Tianjin	North China	6.47%	2.33%	1.42%
Shanxi	North China	5.68%	2.57%	1.45%
Xinjiang	Northwestern China	7.72%	3.01%	3.43%
Fujian	East China	9.68%	2.89%	2.89%
Hebei	North China	8.59%	3.14%	1.89%
Hunan	South Central China	5.99%	3.24%	2.12%
Guangxi	South Central China	5.30%	3.46%	3.10%
Shanghai	East China	6.21%	3.00%	1.79%
Jiangxi	East China	6.98%	4.02%	2.48%
Shaanxi	Northwestern China	9.82%	4.39%	3.33%
Jiangsu	East China	7.88%	4.36%	3.08%
Inner Mongolia	North China	11.59%	4.73%	3.83%
Hainan	South Central China	9.72%	5.07%	4.05%
Henan	South Central China	7.91%	5.37%	2.91%
Chongqing	Southwestern China	8.90%	5.08%	1.93%
Hubei	South Central China	9.31%	5.32%	2.77%
Shandong	East China	10.75%	5.89%	4.01%
Sichuan	Southwestern China	9.87%	6.55%	4.74%
Zhejiang	East China	8.55%	6.47%	3.14%
Yunnan	Southwestern China	15.44%	7.60%	5.77%
Ningxia	Northwestern China	15.72%	7.82%	5.07%
Anhui	East China	13.43%	9.90%	5.54%
Gansu	Northwestern China	19.68%	10.62%	8.32%
Guizhou	Southwestern China	19.85%	11.40%	8.77%
Qinghai	Northwestern China	25.44%	12.94%	10.01%
Tibet	Southwestern China	47.25%	32.29%	28.08%
Mainland China		9.08%	4.88%	3.26%

== Hong Kong and Macau ==
Rank	Name	%
—	Hong Kong	3%
—	Macau	1.9%
