= List of Chinese provincial-level divisions by disposable income per capita =

This is a list of the first-level administrative divisions of mainland China in order of their total disposable income per capita in 2023. The figures are given in Renminbi. Hong Kong SAR, and Macau SAR are excluded.

Chinese administrative divisions by disposable income per capita in 2014

Chinese administrative divisions by nominal GDP per capita in 2014

Disposable income is total personal income minus personal current taxes. In national accounts definitions, personal income, minus personal current taxes equals disposable personal income. Subtracting personal outlays (which includes the major category of personal (or, private) consumption expenditure) yields personal (or, private) savings.

In 2023, the average exchange rate between RMB (CNY) and USD is 7.0467:1.

Color	Regions of China
	North China
	East China
	Southwestern China
	Northwestern China
	South Central China
	Northeast China

2023 Rank	Province	Region	Disposable income per capita RMB¥	Disposable income per capita USD$	Nominal GDP per capita USD$	Average household size (Note: 2020 census data)	Disposable income per household RMB¥	Disposable income per household USD$
1	Shanghai	East China	84,834	12,039	27,001	2.32	196,815	27,930
2	Beijing	North China	81,752	11,601	28,421	2.31	188,847	26,799
3	Zhejiang	East China	63,830	9,058	17,745	2.35	150,001	21,287
4	Jiangsu	East China	52,674	7,475	21,356	2.60	136,952	19,435
5	Tianjin	North China	51,271	7,276	17,420	2.40	123,050	17,462
6	Guangdong	South Central China	49,327	7,000	15,182	2.63	129,730	18,410
7	Fujian	East China	45,426	6,446	18,429	2.68	121,742	17,276
8	Shandong	East China	39,890	5,661	12,881	2.70	107,703	15,284
—	China		39,218	5,565	12,681	2.62	102,751	14,581
9	Inner Mongolia	North China	38,130	5,411	14,571	2.35	89,606	12,716
10	Liaoning	Northeast China	37,992	5,391	10,233	2.29	87,002	12,346
11	Chongqing	Southwestern China	37,595	5,335	13,359	2.45	92,108	13,071
12	Hunan	South Central China	35,895	5,094	10,776	2.67	95,840	13,601
13	Hubei	South Central China	35,146	4,988	13,558	2.65	93,137	13,217
14	Anhui	East China	34,893	4,952	10,903	2.61	91,071	12,924
15	Jiangxi	East China	34,242	4,859	10,106	2.94	100,671	14,286
16	Hainan	South Central China	33,192	4,710	10,353	3.06	101,568	14,413
17	Hebei	North China	32,903	4,669	8,420	2.75	90,483	11,581
18	Sichuan	Southwestern China	32,514	4,614	10,194	2.51	81,610	11,581
19	Shaanxi	Northwestern China	32,128	4,559	12,126	2.53	81,284	11,535
20	Ningxia	Northwestern China	31,604	4,485	10,353	2.65	83,751	11,885
21	Shanxi	North China	30,924	4,388	10,499	2.52	77,928	11,059
22	Henan	South Central China	29,933	4,248	8,525	2.86	85,608	12,149
23	Jilin	Northeast China	29,797	4,229	7,762	2.34	69,725	9,895
24	Heilongjiang	Northeast China	29,694	4,214	7,317	2.22	65,921	9,355
25	Guangxi	South Central China	29,514	4,188	7,664	2.87	84,705	12,021
26	Tibet	Southwestern China	28,983	4,113	9,315	3.19	92,456	13,120
27	Xinjiang	Northwestern China	28,947	4,108	10,469	(Note: No data)	N/A	N/A
28	Qinghai	Northwestern China	28,587	4,057	9,069	2.79	79,758	11,318
29	Yunnan	Southwestern China	28,421	4,033	9,097	2.88	81,852	11,616
30	Guizhou	Southwestern China	27,098	3,845	7,688	2.81	76,145	10,806
31	Gansu	Northwestern China	25,011	3,549	6,793	2.77	69,280	9,832
