= South China (disambiguation) =

South China is a geographical region of China.

South China or Southern China may also refer to:

- One of the regions of China:
  - Southern China
    - Southeast China
      - East China (some geographers include the Taiwan Island, Penghu, Kinmen, Matsu Islands, and Senkaku Islands in this subregion)
    - South Central China
      - Central China
      - South China (including the Hainan Island, Paracel Islands, and Zhongsha Islands
    - Southwest China
- South China AA, a sports club best known for its football team which plays in Hong Kong
- South China (continent), an ancient continent studied in geology
- South China, Maine, a village in the town of China in Kennebec County, Maine, United States
- Southern China, an approximate geographical, culture and language region within China
- South China Mall
- South China Morning Post, a Hong Kong newspaper
- South China Sea
- South China tiger, a species
