= Central China =

Geographic region

- Region
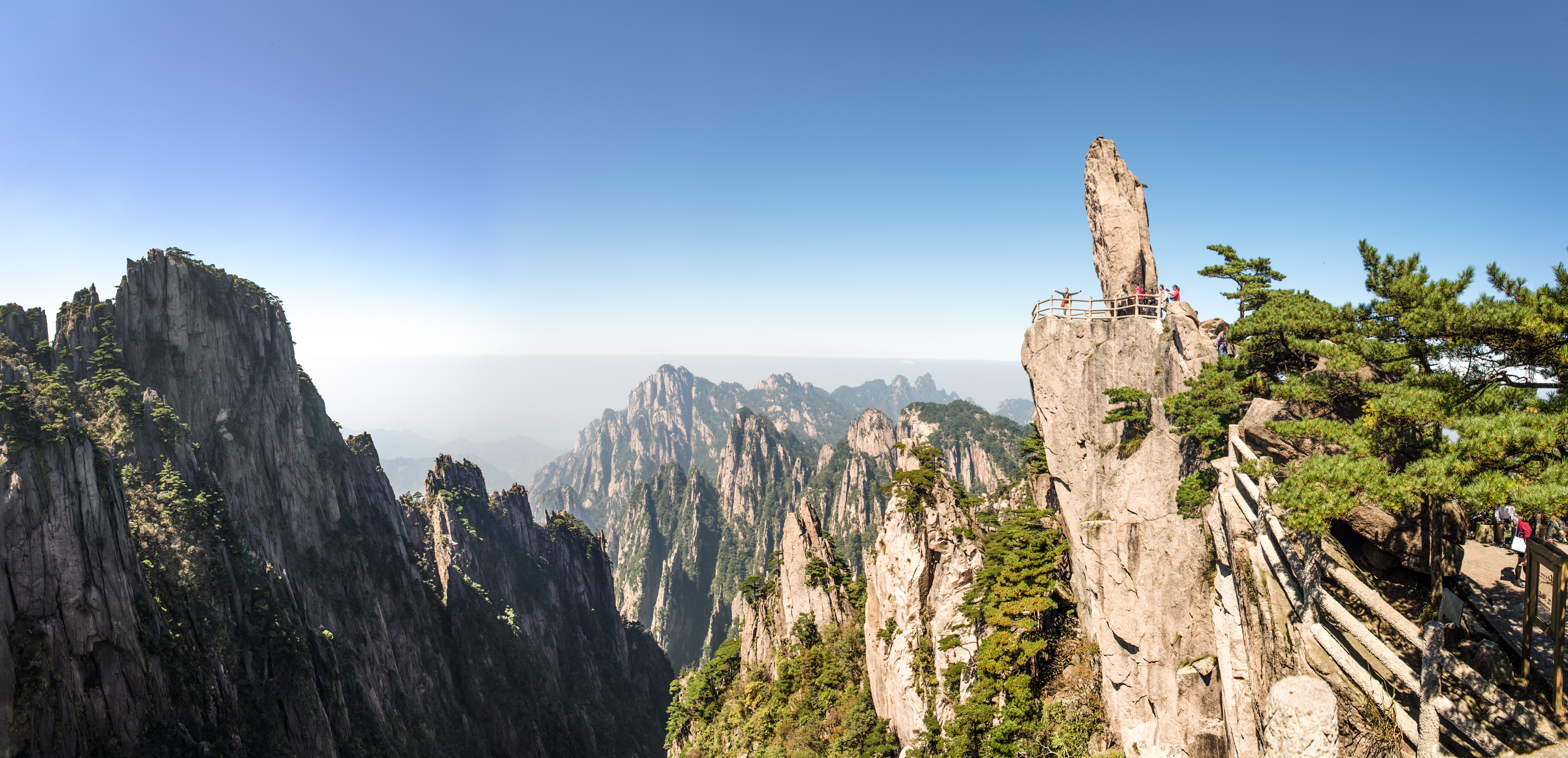
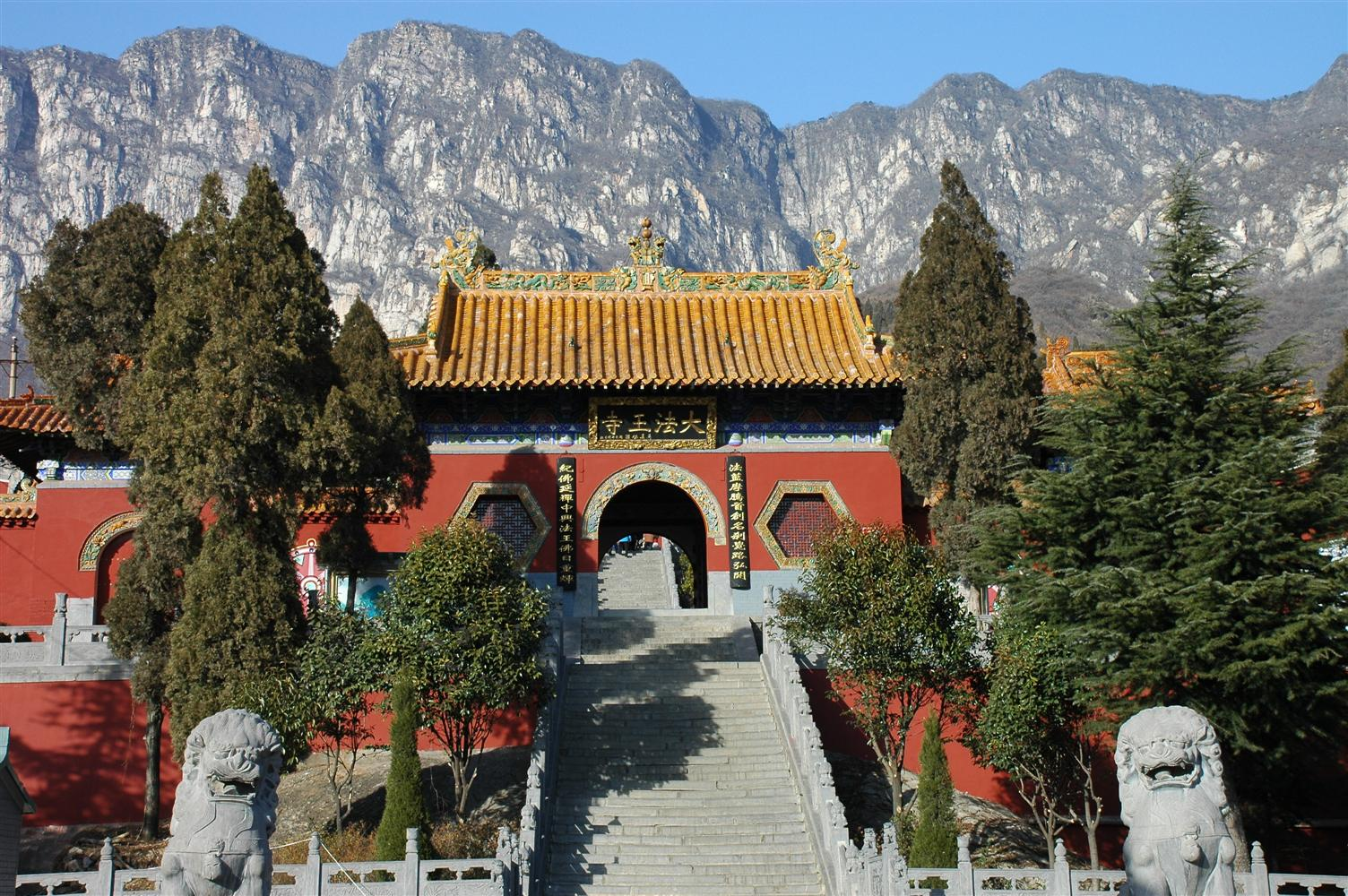
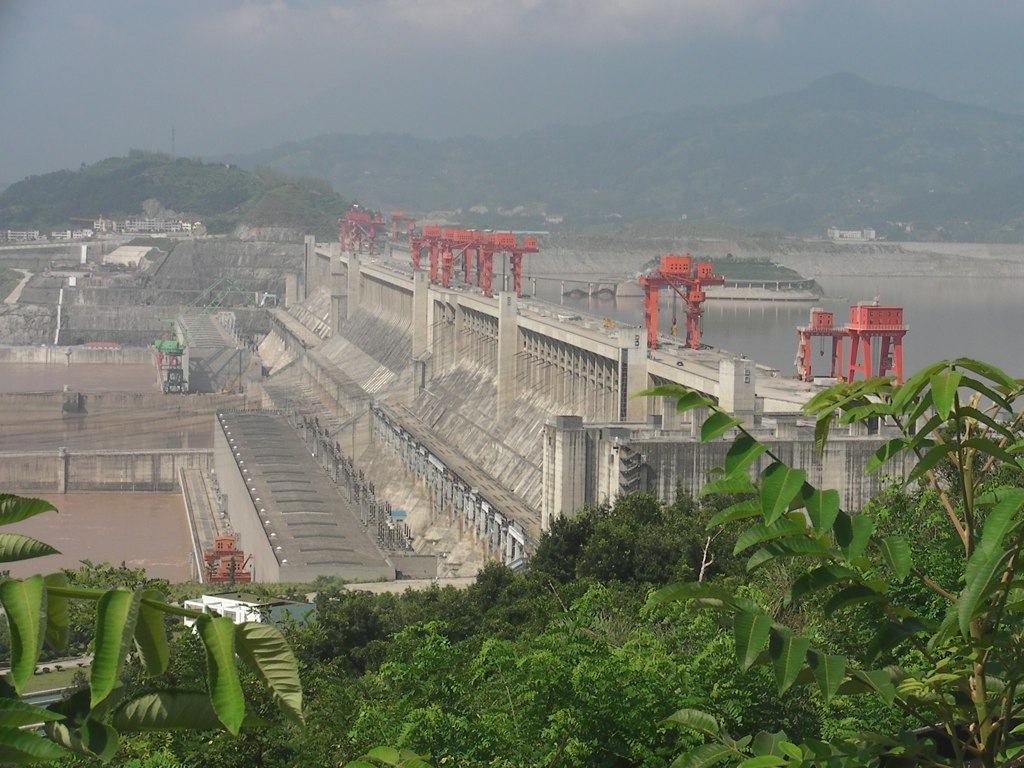
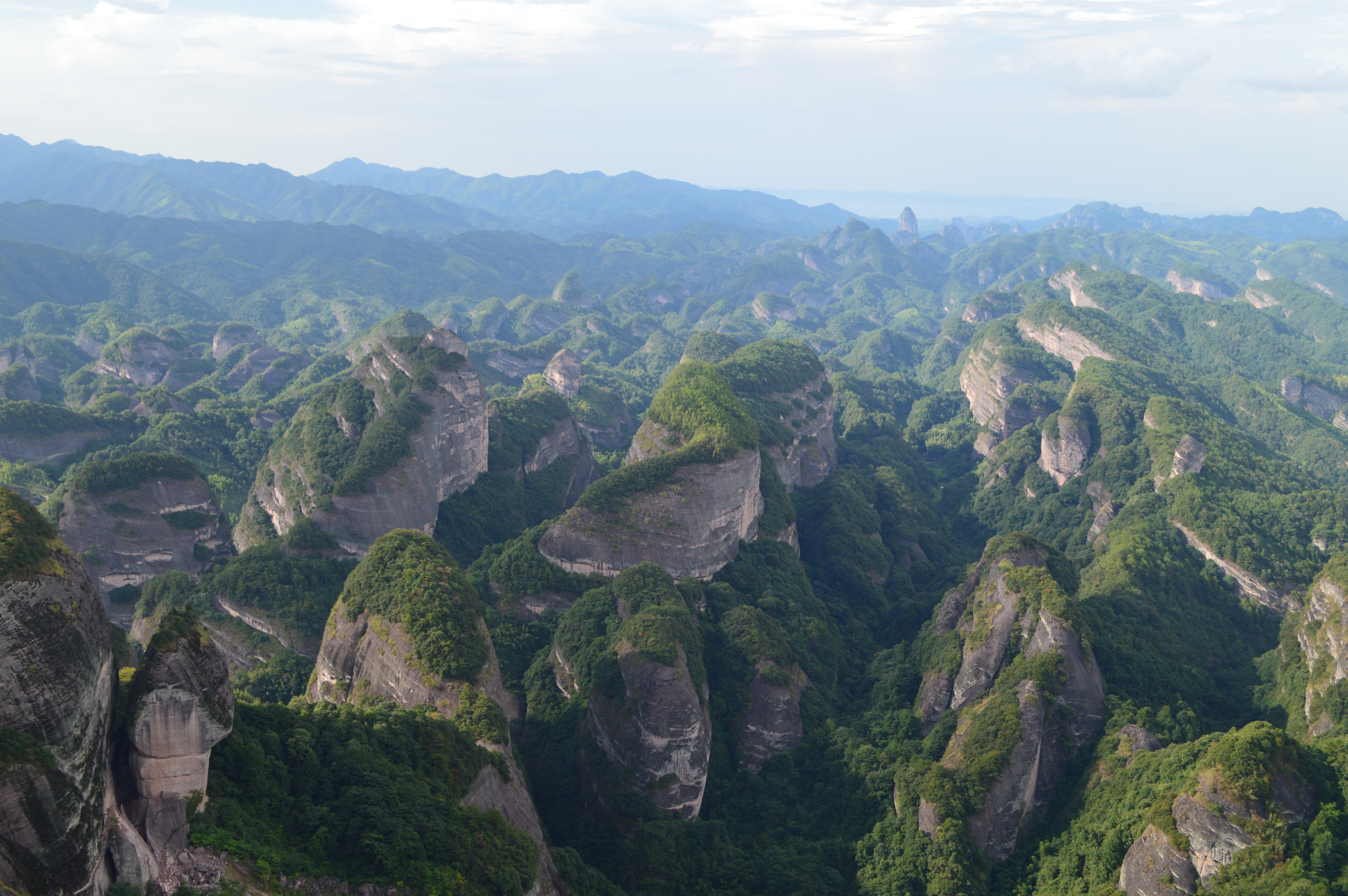
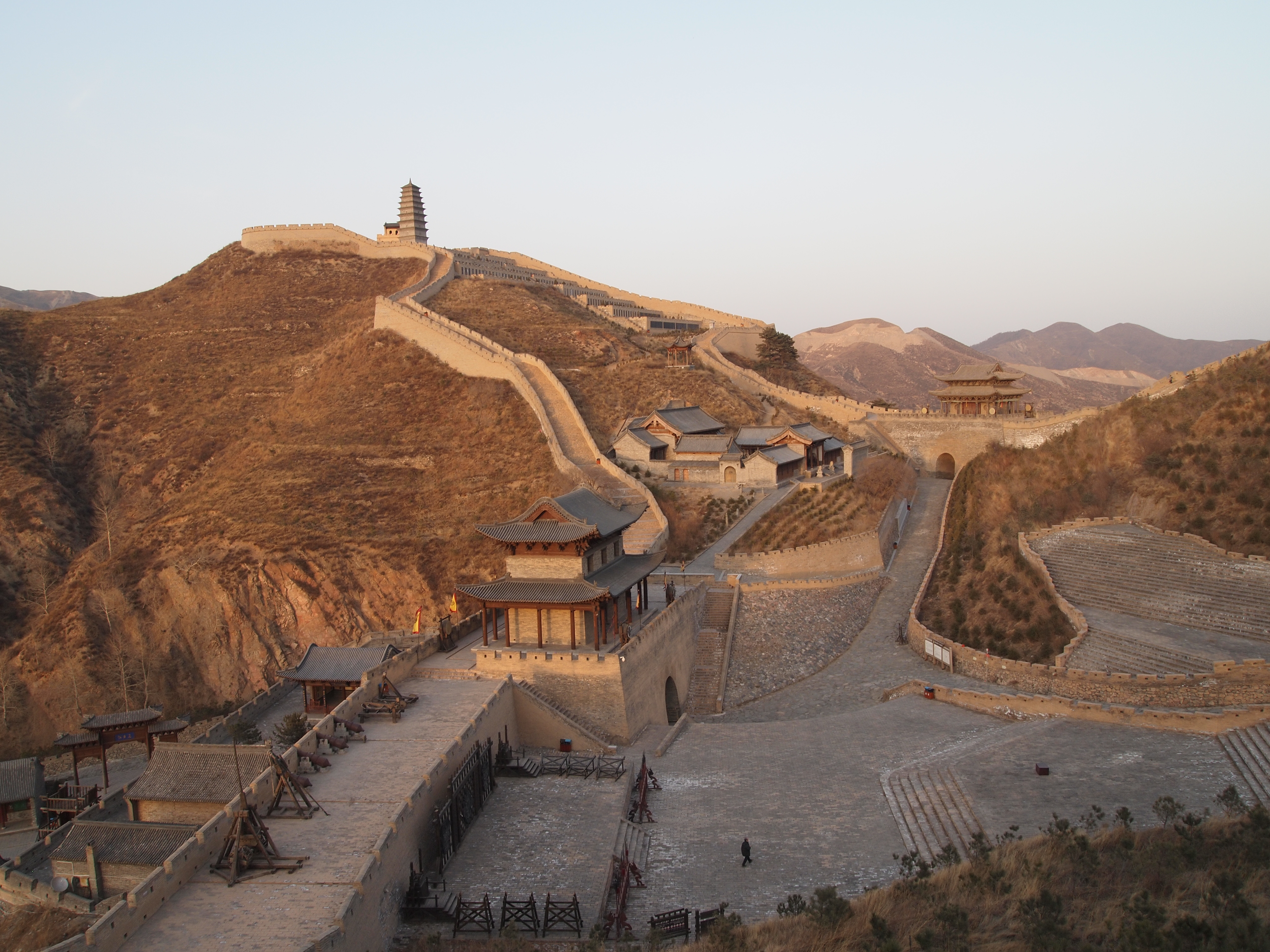
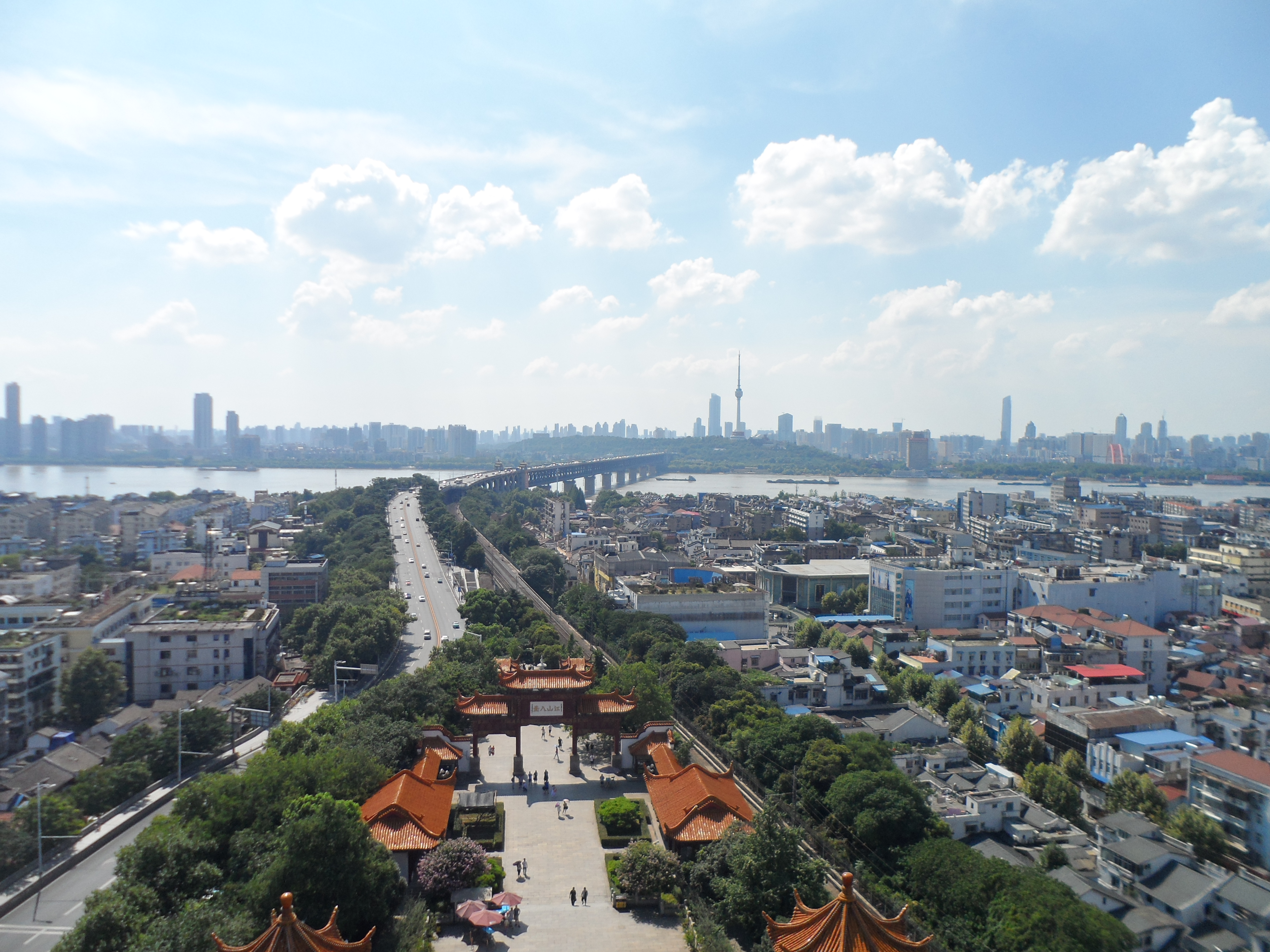
- Huangshan Fawang Temple Three Gorges dam Mount Langshan Yanmen Pass Yangtze River in Wuhan

- Central China in green
- Country: China
- Provinces: Anhui; Henan; Hubei; Hunan; Jiangxi; Shanxi
- Most populous cities: Wuhan; Zhengzhou; Changsha; Luoyang; Xiangyang

Area
  - Total: 1,026,431 km^{2} (396,307 sq mi)

Population (2020)
  - Total: 364,694,362
  - Density: 355.3033/km^{2} (920.2314/sq mi)

Central China (Chinese: 华中; pinyin: Huázhōng) is a region in China that includes the provinces of Anhui, Henan, Hubei, Hunan, Jiangxi, and Shanxi. Covering a land area of more than one million square kilometres (390,000 sq mi), the region is home to a population of more than 364 million people.

The Central China region has a long history of human inhabitation. Ancient Chinese civilization emerged between 2500 and 2000 BCE along the Yellow River. The Xia dynasty, considered as China's first dynasty came up in the Henan region. The earliest written Chinese records were found at Yinxu, the capital of Shang dynasty.

Subsequently, the region was then ruled over by various dynasties of China such as Tang, Song, Yuan, Ming, and Qing dynasties with capitals located elsewhere in China. After an uncertain period in the first half of the 20th century, the region became part of the People's Republic of China in 1949. Since the early 21st century, Central China has seen increased domestic investment.

The topography of the region consists of mountains interspersed with valleys around the Yangtze and Yellow rivers. The valleys drained by these rivers host fertile stretches of agricultural lands used for rice cultivation. The region has a temperate climate with four distinct seasons. With a gross domestic product of US$4,173.2 billion, the region contributed to about 22% of the national GDP in 2024.

== History ==
The ancient Chinese civilization developed in the Central China between 2500 and 2000 BCE along the Yellow River. The Xia dynasty considered as the first dynasty in China ruled the region between 2100 and 1600 BCE. The first attempts were made to unify the various tribes in the Henan region were made during the reign of the Xias. They were succeeded by the Shang and Zhou dynasties. The earliest written record of Chinese have been found at Yinxu (near modern Anyang, Henan), the site of the final Shang capital during the Late Shang period (c. 1250–1050 BC). The Zhou dynasty ruled over most of the central and lower Yellow River valley and had command over semi-independent states across the region. In 771 BC, King You was defeated in the Battle of Mount Li by rebel states and Quanrong barbarians, and King Ping became the new ruler, marking the beginning of the Eastern Zhou period.

While several artifacts have been recovered through archeological excavations from the later period up to 300 BCE, it does not provide definite evidence as to the organization of the settlements during the time. After the Warring States period, Ying Zheng established the Qin dynasty in 221 BCE, which effectively formalised the rule over the region. The region was then ruled over by various dynasties of China such as Tang, Song, Yuan, Ming, and Qing dynasties with capitals located elsewhere in China. After an uncertain period in the first half of the 20th century, the region became part of the People's Republic of China in 1949.

Since the turn of the 21st century, the central provinces have experienced a steady increase in domestic investment, particularly from coastal regions as a part of the Rise of Central China Plan. As a part of the government's plan to urbanize 250 million people by 2025, people from rural provincial towns have been pushed to re-settle in cities, and county-level towns in central China. The region was the center of the source of COVID-19 outbreak in 2020 that killed millions across the world.

== Geography ==
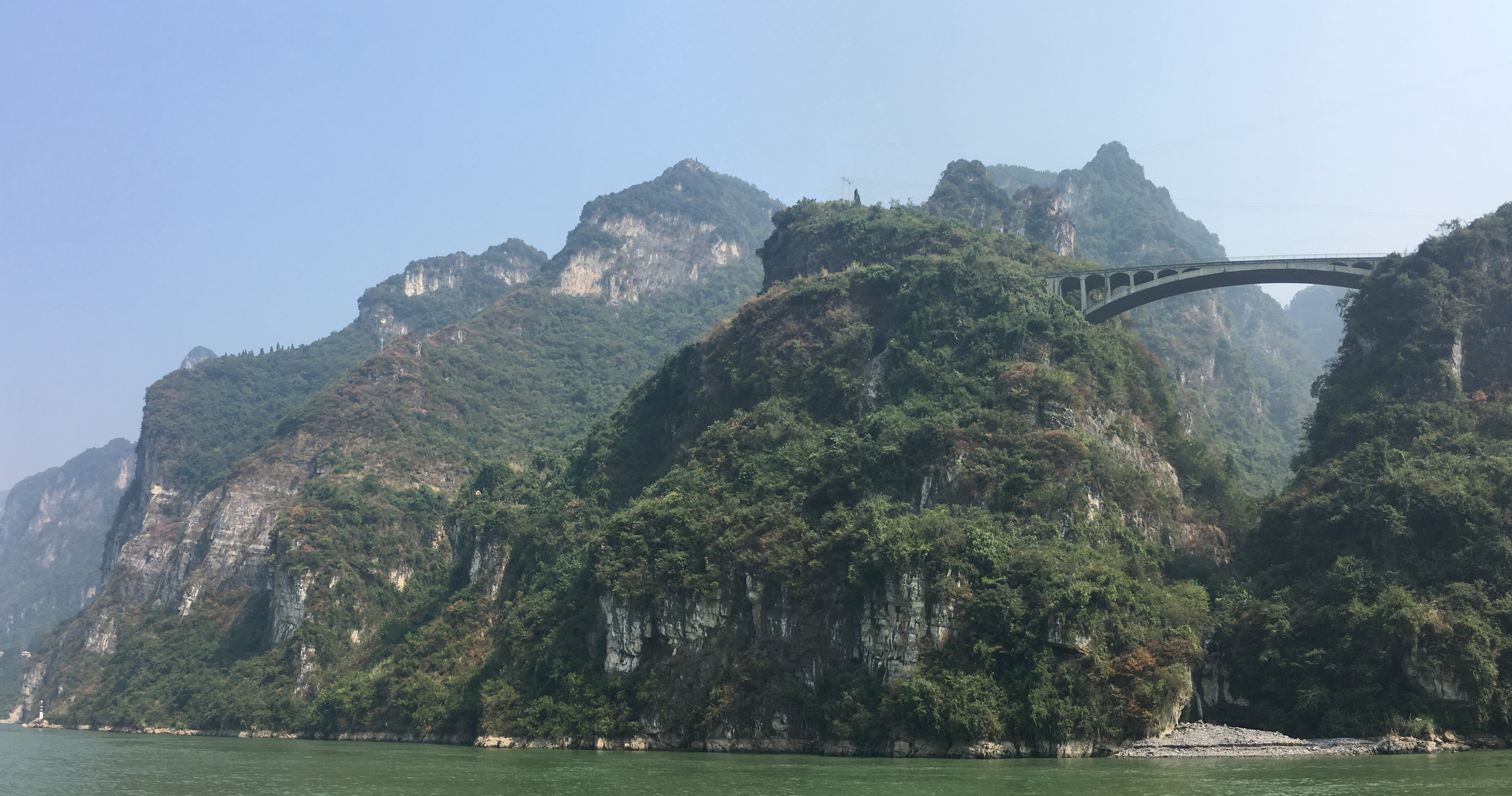
Yangtze River flowing through the Xiling Gorge in Hubei province

As per the Rise of Central China Plan by the State Council of the People's Republic of China in 2004, the provinces of Anhui, Henan, Hubei, Hunan, Jiangxi, and Shanxi are defined as part of Central China, one of the four developmental regions in China. The topography of the region consists of mountains interspersed with valleys. The region is spread across the upper and middle course of the Yangtze river, which drains an area of 1,127,000 km^{2} (435,000 sq mi). The Three Gorges Dam in Hubei province, resulted in the inundation of more than 630 km^{2} (240 sq mi) land in the region. It has the largest hydroelectric power production capacity in the world. The valleys drained by the Yangtze and Yellow rivers host fertile stretches of agricultural lands used for rice cultivation. The region has large metasomatite deposits formed during the Mesozoic era.

Studies indicate that the region experienced erratic climatic conditions before 3000 BCE, after which it stabilized. The region has a temperate climate with four distinct seasons. The region experiences hot summers and cold winters, with seasonal rainfall throughout the year.

=== Administrative divisions ===
Provinces in Central China
Province	Code	Capital	Area (km^{2})	Population
Anhui	AH	Hefei	139,879	61,027,171
Henan	HA	Zhengzhou	167,000	99,365,519
Hubei	HB	Wuhan	185,900	57,752,557
Hunan	HN	Changsha	210,000	66,444,864
Jiangxi	JX	Nanchang	166,939	45,188,635
Shanxi	SX	Taiyuan	156,713	34,915,616
Total			10,26,431	364,694,362

== Demographics ==
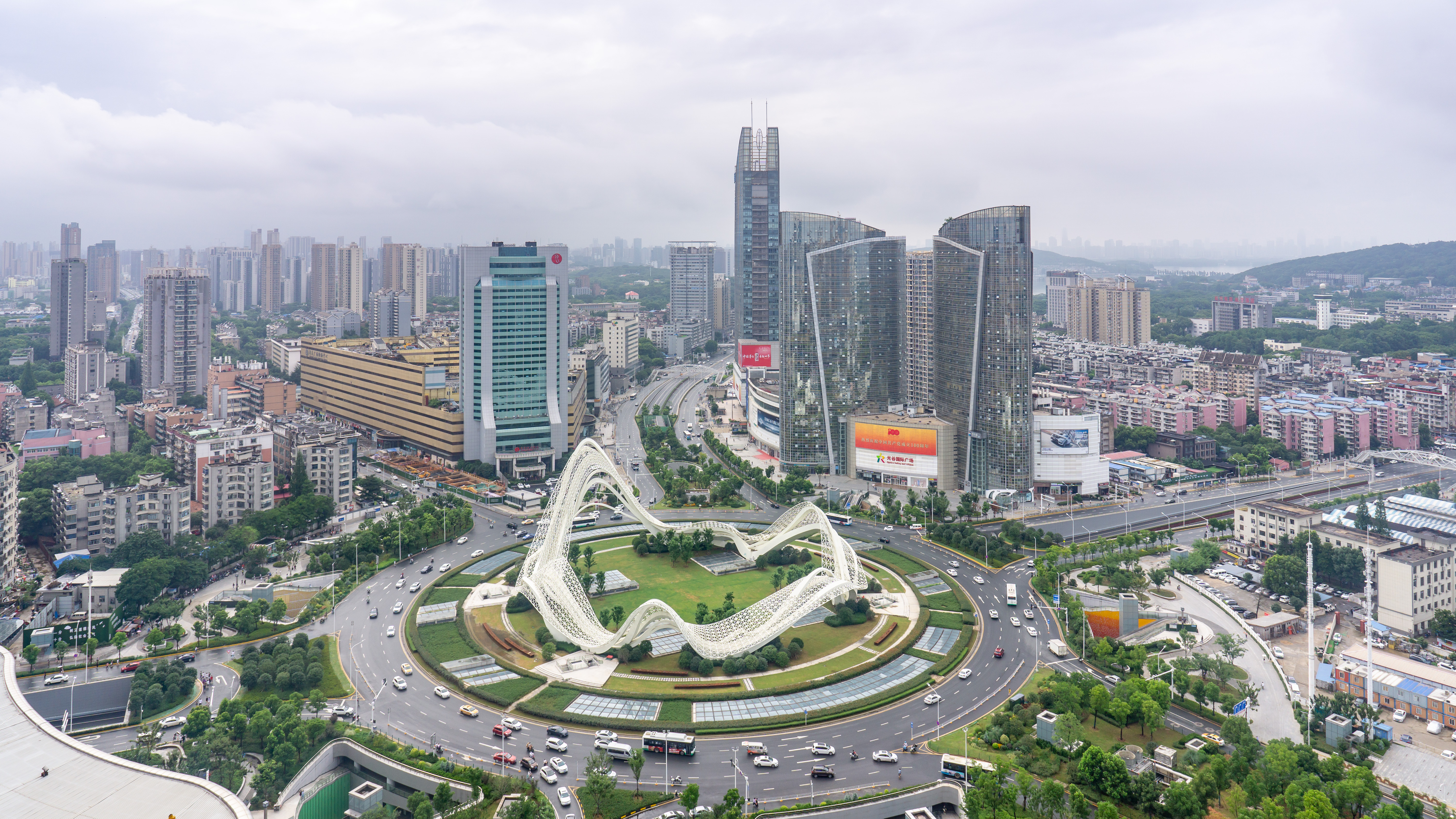
Wuhan, the largest city in the region

Central China is home to nearly 364.7 million people. Males constituted 50.9% of the population and females made up 49.1% of the population. About 20% of the population was below the age of 14 years, and 13.9% was over the age of 65 years. The region is urbanized, with 59% of the population living in urban areas. Central China has a literacy rate of 97% amongst the eligible age group (15 years and above). Han people made up almost 97% of the population, with Miao, Hui, Zhuang, Mongols, and Tibetans contributing to significant minorities.

=== Largest cities ===
City	Urban area	District area	City proper	Province
Wuhan	7,541,527	9,785,388	9,785,388	Hubei
Zhengzhou	3,677,032	4,253,913	8,627,089	Henan
Changsha	2,963,218	3,092,213	7,040,952	Hunan
Luoyang	1,584,463	1,926,079	6,549,941	Henan
Xiangyang	1,433,057	2,199,690	5,500,307	Hubei
Hengyang	1,115,645	1,133,967	7,148,344	Hunan
Yichang	1,049,363	1,411,380	4,059,686	Hubei

== Economy ==
While the economy of the Central China region developed in the 1960s, the growth was curtailed in the 1980s as the coastal China became the center of economic and political development. Only in the 21st century, the central provinces experienced a steady increase in economic activity focused around the Rise of Central China Plan. The plan provided support for industrialization of the region, and led to greater contribution of the region to the overall economy of the country. The Central China region is an important enabler for industries in other region especially the coastal region. In terms of mining, engineering, and industrial intermediate goods, the region contributes to the consumption of other regions. As of 2024, the Central China region had a gross domestic product of US$4,173.2 billion, which is about 22% of the national GDP. The presence of large tracts of arable land, has contributed to the growth of agricultural sector.

== See also ==
- Regions of China
  - East China and Western China
  - Northern and southern China
  - South Central China
  - Northeast China, Northwest China and South west China
- China proper
