= Carex capilliculmis =

Scientific classification
- Kingdom: Plantae
- Clade: Embryophytes
- Clade: Tracheophytes
- Clade: Angiosperms
- Clade: Monocots
- Clade: Commelinids
- Order: Poales
- Family: Cyperaceae
- Genus: Carex
- Species: C. capilliculmis

Binomial name
- Carex capilliculmis S.R.Zhang

Synonyms
- Carex filamentosa K.T.Fu

Species of sedge

Carex capilliculmis is a tussock-forming perennial in the family Cyperaceae. It is endemic to central parts of China in the North Central, South Central and Qinghai provinces.

== See also ==
- List of Carex species
