= Carex drepanorhyncha =

Scientific classification
- Kingdom: Plantae
- Clade: Tracheophytes
- Clade: Angiosperms
- Clade: Monocots
- Clade: Commelinids
- Order: Poales
- Family: Cyperaceae
- Genus: Carex
- Species: C. drepanorhyncha

Binomial name
- Carex drepanorhyncha Franch.

Species of plant

Carex drepanorhyncha is a tussock-forming species of perennial sedge in the family Cyperaceae. It is native to South-Central China. It has a Chinese common name of 镰喙薹草, or lián huì tái cǎo, meaning sicklebill.

== Description ==
The rhizome is woody, rigid, and stoloniferous. The tufted culms are between 20 and 45 centimeters in height, and has dark brown sheaths at the base. The leaves are longer than the culms, 3 to 5 millimeters wide, and flat. The bracts are shortly bladed and have a height of between 8 and 15 millimeters long. There are 4 or 5 spikes, with terminal male spikes and lateral female spikes. The female glumes are red-brown in color and around 3.5 millimeters long. The utricles are yellow-green and longer than the glumes. The nutlets are pale brown and ovate.

== See also ==
- List of Carex species
