= Northeast Area Revitalization Plan =

Chinese economic policy

Eastern China
"Rise of Central China"
"Revitalize Northeast China"
"China Western Development"

Revitalize The Old Northeast Industrial Bases (simplified Chinese: 振兴东北老工业基地; traditional Chinese: 振興東北老工業基地; pinyin: Zhènxīng Dōngběi Lǎo Gōngyè Jīdì), also Revitalize Northeast China or Northeast China Revitalization, is a policy adopted by the People's Republic of China to rejuvenate industrial bases in Northeast China.

The areas targeted once functioned as the center of heavy industry in China, first under Japanese-occupation (Manchukuo and Kwantung Leased Territory) and then under the state-led development of the People's Republic of China before reform and opening up. Since the 1980s, the region has been heavily affected by the economic reform, and widespread unemployments known in Chinese as Xiagang (下岗; lit. step down from the post) due to the closure of many heavy industry state-owned enterprises (SOEs).

It covers three provinces: Heilongjiang, Jilin, and Liaoning, collectively referred to as Dongbei, as well as the five eastern prefectures of Inner Mongolia: Xilin Gol, Chifeng, Tongliao, Hinggan and Hulunbuir.

== History ==
In the early years of the People's Republic of China, during the First (1953-1957) and Second Five-Year Plan (1958-1962), 56 of the 156 key national industrial projects were allocated in Northeast China. The Northeast also inherited the industrial base left over from the puppet regime of Manchukuo established by Imperial Japan, thus earning it the reputation of being the "cradle of socialist industrial construction." This economic attainment, together with its abundant oil, minerals, coal, and timber, had for much of the 20th century, turned the Northeast into the nation's most developed region in terms of industry and manufacturing output.

Since the 1990s, the reform and restructuring of state-owned enterprises (SOEs) have resulted in massive layoffs and unemployment among SOE workers, with a significant impact on Northeast, a region dominated by SOEs. Northeast China was called the "last bastion of the planned economy," reflecting both the glory and the drawbacks of the planned economy.

SOE reform was a major undertaking in the old industrial base of Northeast China. Due to prominent systemic and structural contradictions, the economic development of the Northeast stagnated, and a considerable number of SOEs fell into difficulties, with aging equipment and technology, declining competitiveness, and prominent employment problems—a situation known as the "Northeast Phenomenon" (东北现象).

=== Plans for Revival ===
In 10th September, 2003, the then Premier of China Wen Jiabao held a State Council meeting regarding the issue of reviving northeast China. The meeting saw the drafting of the document "Certain Opinions Regarding Implementing the Strategies of Reviving the Old Industrial Bases Including the Northeast", which would be jointly disseminated by the Central Committee of the CCP and the State Council in October 2003.

The State Council established a special Leading Group to define and adopt related strategies, which held its first meeting in August 2009 and the second in August 2010. The Chairman of the Leading Group is Premier Wen Jiabao.

Following the first meeting of the Leading Group, the revitalization strategy was affirmed and extended in a document of September 9, 2009. The State Council asked the Northeastern provinces to better coordinate their economic development strategies. As a result, the top party and government leaders of Liaoning, Jilin, Heilongjiang and Inner Mongolia met in Shenyang, capital of Liaoning for the first Northeast Summit in April 2010, and signed a framework agreement of 25 articles for cooperation and integrated regional development.

The core of the program is to revitalize the region's traditional industry, while speeding up development in aspects of structural regulation, regional cooperation, economic reform, the construction of an environment-friendly economy, and increased efforts in education, healthcare, and cultural projects.

In 2016, it was announced that 1.6 trillion RMB would be used to continue to revitalize the economy.

Cooperation with Russia, North and South Korea, and Mongolia, as well as securing natural gas supplies is also one of the important factors in this revitalisation program.

== See also ==
- Bohai Economic Rim
- Yangtze River Delta Economic Zone
- China Western Development
- Rise of Central China Plan
- Economy of China
- Dongbei renaissance
