= Qiongri'asang =

Qiongri'asang ཆིཨོང་རི་ཨ་སང་
- Location in China
- Coordinates: 32°50′N 89°00′E
- Country: China
- Region: Tibet
- Elevation: 16,883 ft (5,146 m)

Population
  - Total: 0
- Time zone: UTC+8 (China Standard)
- Area code: 0891

Qiongri'asang (Chinese: 窮日阿桑, Tibetan: ཆིཨོང་རི་ཨ་སང་) is a ghost town in the Tibet Autonomous Region of China. The town has not been populated since before 2010. To its north, it borders the Longren (陇仁) grazing area, and to its east, its borders the Suorikabao Dijiari'ai (索日卡保蒂加日埃) grazing area.

== See also ==
- List of towns and villages in Tibet
