= Rise of Central China Plan =

Chinese economic policy

| Eastern China |
| "Rise of Central China" |
| "Revitalize Northeast China" |
| "China Western Development" |

The Rise of Central China Plan (simplified Chinese: 中部崛起计划; traditional Chinese: 中部崛起計劃; pinyin: Zhōngbù Juéqǐ Jìhuà) also known as Six Central Provinces is a policy adopted by the People's Republic of China to accelerate the development of its central regions. It was announced by Premier Wen Jiabao on 5 March 2004 during his delivery of the Annual Work Report of the State Council. It covers six provinces: Shanxi, Henan, Anhui, Hubei, Hunan, and Jiangxi.

== See also ==
- Economy of China
- Bohai Economic Rim
- Beibu Gulf Economic Rim
- Pearl River Delta Economic Zone
- Yangtze River Delta Economic Zone
