= Northeast Summit =

The first China Northeast Summit (Chinese: 东北四省区合作行政首长联席会议) took place in Shenyang on April 16, 2010, and resulted in a framework agreement (Chinese: 东北四省区合作框架协议) between the provincial governments of Liaoning, Jilin, Heilongjiang, and Inner Mongolia. All top government and party leaders of the Northeast gathered with the purpose of coordinating and integrating their regional development strategies. The first Summit decided to hold future meetings once every year and with rotating presidency. The 2011 Summit was scheduled to be held in Changchun on July 25.

== Background ==
The Northeast Revitalization Plan (Chinese: 东北地区振兴规划), issued in August 2007 by the Office of the State Council Leading Group, mentioned for the first time the need to establish a high level coordination mechanism for consultation and decision-making on important issues of regional development.

In September 2009, the State Council issued a policy document about the further revitalization of Northeast China. In articles 24 and 25, the document called for deeper regional cooperation and economic integration in the region, and specifically suggested to establish a regular negotiation mechanism of the administrative chiefs of the four provinces to coordinate cross provincial infrastructure projects and regional development.

Similar top level regional economic development coordination and rationalization agendas or mechanisms of neighboring regions had earlier been established in the Pearl River Delta, the Yangtze River Delta, and the Bohai Economic Rim to improve the traditionally hesitant exchange between regions (or departments) on the same level.

== 2010 Framework Agreement ==
The agreement of the first Summit contains 25 articles on the conditions, the fields, and the mechanisms of cooperation. Accordingly, the Summit is the highest decision-making organ of cooperation between the four provinces. A coordinating secretariate meeting and supporting regular communication mechanisms are to be established under the Development and Reform Commissions of each province. Platforms for better exchange between government departments and sectors are to be provided. Fields of cooperation include economic planning, communications, energy, ecology, industry, agriculture, commerce, foreign trade and investment, logistics, tourism, financing, science and technology, education, health, and culture.
