= Beibu Gulf Economic Rim =

Economic region around Gulf of Tonkin

The Beibu Gulf Economic Rim or Beibu Economic Belt (simplified Chinese: 环北部湾经济圈; traditional Chinese: 環北部灣經濟圈; pinyin: Huán Běi bù wān jīng jì quān) also known as Gulf of Tonkin Economic Belt in (Vietnamese: Vành đai kinh tế vịnh Bắc Bộ) defines the economic region or rim surrounding around China's southwestern coastal region and cities around the Gulf of Tonkin. The region is part of Chinese government's "Go West" strategy, to boost its less developed western regions. The implementation of the campaign, has resulted in many construction projects in cities on the Beibu Gulf Rim, especially in Guangxi. The Beibu Gulf economic rim has emerged as a new highlight of China-ASEAN cooperation, especially with Vietnam, who is also cooperating in this economic zone. It covers Guangdong, Hainan and Guangxi, and northern and central Vietnam.

== Geography ==
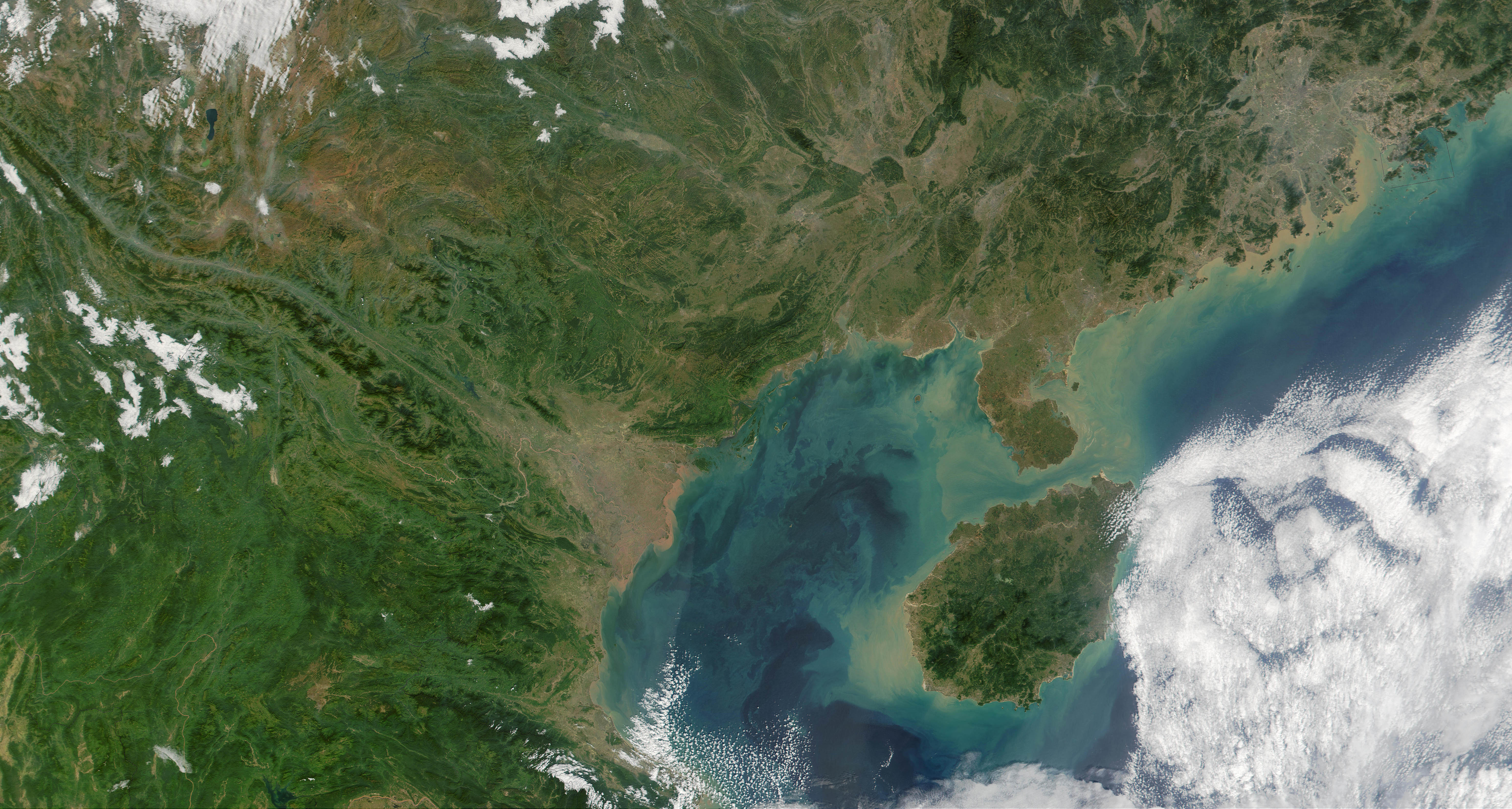
Beibu Gulf or Gulf of Tonkin

=== China ===
- Guangxi region: Nanning, Beihai, Yulin, Qinzhou, Chongzuo, and Fangchenggang
- Guangdong province: Zhanjiang (Lianjiang and Leizhou)
- Hainan province: Haikou, Danzhou, Dongfang, and Sanya

=== Vietnam ===
- Municipalities: Hanoi and Haiphong
- Northeastern Vietnam and Red River Delta
- North Central Vietnam: Hà Tĩnh, Quảng Bình, Thanh Hóa, Nghệ An, and Quảng Trị.

The cooperation scope includes trade, investment, exploitation of marine, tourism, and oceanic environmental protection.

== See also ==
- Sino-Vietnamese relations
