= South Central China =

Geographic region of China

- Statistical region
- Country: China

Area
  - Total: 1,014,354 km^{2} (391,644 sq mi)

Population
  - Total: 383,559,808
  - Density: 378/km^{2} (980/sq mi)

GDP (nominal, 2024)
  - Total: CN¥35.51 trillion (US$5.5 trillion)
- Largest city: Shenzhen

South Central China, South-Central China or Central-South China (Chinese: 中南; pinyin: Zhōngnán; lit. 'Central-South'), is a region of the People's Republic of China. It consists of eight provincial administrative regions, namely Henan, Hubei, Hunan, Guangdong, Guangxi, Hainan.

South Central China sometimes is further classified into regions of South China (华南) and Central China (华中).

== Administrative divisions ==
GB	ISO No.	Provincial-level division	Chinese Name	Capital	Population	Density	Area	Abbr.	
Yù	41	Henan Province	河南省; Hénán Shěng	Zhengzhou	94,023,567	563.01	167,000	HA	豫
È	42	Hubei Province	湖北省; Húběi Shěng	Wuhan	57,237,740	307.89	185,900	HB	鄂
Xiāng	43	Hunan Province	湖南省; Húnán Shěng	Changsha	65,683,722	312.77	210,000	HN	湘
Yuè	44	Guangdong Province	广东省; Guǎngdōng Shěng	Guangzhou	104,303,132	579.46	180,000	GD	粤
Guì	45	Guangxi Zhuang Autonomous Region	广西壮族自治区; Guǎngxī Zhuàngzú Zìzhìqū	Nanning	46,026,629	195.02	236,000	GX	桂
Qióng	46	Hainan Province	海南省; Hǎinán Shěng	Haikou	8,671,518	255.04	34,000	HI	琼

== Cities with urban area over one million in population ==
Provincial capitals in bold.

#	City	Urban area	District area	City proper	Prov.	Census date
1	Shenzhen	10,358,381	10,358,381	10,358,381	GD	2010-11-01
2	**Guangzhou**	9,702,144	11,071,424	12,701,948	GD	2010-11-01
3	**Wuhan**	7,541,527	9,785,388	9,785,388	HB	2010-11-01
4	Dongguan	7,271,322	8,220,207	8,220,207	GD	2010-11-01
5	Foshan	6,771,895	7,197,394	7,197,394	GD	2010-11-01
6	**Zhengzhou**	3,677,032	4,253,913	8,627,089	HA	2010-11-01
7	Shantou	3,644,017	5,329,024	5,389,328	GD	2010-11-01
8	**Changsha**	2,963,218	3,092,213	7,040,952	HN	2010-11-01
9	Zhongshan	2,740,994	3,121,275	3,121,275	GD	2010-11-01
10	**Nanning**	2,660,833	3,434,303	6,658,742	GX	2010-11-01
11	Huizhou	1,807,858	2,344,634	4,598,402	GD	2010-11-01
12	Luoyang	1,584,463	1,926,079	6,549,941	HA	2010-11-01
13	**Haikou**	1,517,410	2,046,170	2,046,170	HI	2010-11-01
14	Jiangmen	1,480,023	1,822,614	4,450,703	GD	2010-11-01
15	Xiangfan (Note: Xiangfan was renamed as Xiangyang on 2 December 2010.)	1,433,057	2,199,690	5,500,307	HB	2010-11-01
16	Liuzhou	1,410,712	1,436,599	3,758,704	GX	2010-11-01
17	Zhuhai	1,369,538	1,562,530	1,562,530	GD	2010-11-01
18	Hengyang	1,115,645	1,133,967	7,148,344	HN	2010-11-01
19	Yichang	1,049,363	1,411,380	4,059,686	HB	2010-11-01
20	Zhanjiang	1,038,762	1,611,868	6,994,832	GD	2010-11-01

== See also ==
- Regions of China
  - Central China
  - South China
  - East China
  - Northeast China
  - Southwest China
  - Northwest China
