= Northwestern China =

Geographical region of China

Coordinates: 36.8000°N 95.8000°E

Northwestern China 中国西北地区
- Region
- Country: China
- Largest city: Xi'an

Area
  - Total: 3,107,900 km^{2} (1,200,000 sq mi)

Population
  - Total: 103,528,786
  - Density: 31/km^{2} (80/sq mi)
- Demonym: Northwestern Chinese
- GDP: 2022
- Total: ¥7.040 trillion $1.047 trillion
- Per Capita: ¥68,000 $10,110

Northwestern China (Chinese: 中国西北地区) is a region in the People's Republic of China. It consists of five provincial administrative regions, namely Shaanxi, Gansu, Qinghai, Ningxia, and Xinjiang.

The region is characterized by a (semi-)arid continental climate. It has a diverse population including significant ethnic minorities such as Hui, Uyghurs and Tibetans. Culturally, the region has historically been influenced by the Silk Road.

== Historic security considerations ==
Chinese dynasties from the Qin (221 BC to 207 BC) to the Qing period (1644 CE to 1911 CE) placed high priority on maintaining stability and security in the region, motivated by concerns about potential threats from the Northwest.

Security concerns have continued under modern governments. During the Republic of China period, the government was only able to exercise loose control in the Northwest. In 1933, Pan-Islamic and Pan-Turkic separatists declared an Islamic Republic of East Turkestan based on constitutionally-enshrined Sharia law. The short-lived separatist Islamic Republic was not recognized by any other countries and was suppressed after three months of existence.

With Soviet Union backing, separatists declared a second short-lived East Turkestan Republic in 1944 based in Yining. The Soviet Union withdrew its support in June 1946. A separatist movement drawing on the legacy of the short-lived East Turkestan Republics continues today.

== During land reform movement ==
During China's land reform movement (which began after the defeat of the Japanese in the Second Sino-Japanese War and continued in the early years of the People's Republic of China), the Communist Party encouraged rural women in achieving a "double fanshen" - a revolutionary transformation as both a peasant and a feminist awakening as a woman. The progress of Hui women in Northwestern China was promoted as by the Party as an example of such a success. Through the rural movement, Hui women were said to have not just received land, but also "freedom over their own bodies." Hui women embraced political participation and the rural revolution. The land reform movement succeeded among Hui people because activists first won over elder generations.

== Industry ==
In the first half of the 20th century, industrial development in China's northwest was state-led.

== Administrative divisions ==
GB	ISO No.	Province	Chinese Name	Capital	Population	Density (per km^{2})	Area (km^{2})	Abbreviation/Symbol	
Shǎn (Qín)	61	Shaanxi Province	陕西省; Shǎnxī Shěng	Xi'an	39,530,000	190	205,600	SN	陕(秦)
Gān (Lǒng)	62	Gansu Province	甘肃省; Gānsù Shěng	Lanzhou	25,019,831	55	454,300	GS	甘(陇)
Qīng	63	Qinghai Province	青海省; Qīnghǎi Shěng	Xining	5,923,957	8.2	721,200	QH	青
Níng	64	Ningxia Hui Autonomous Region	宁夏回族自治区; Níngxià Huízú Zìzhìqū	Yinchuan	7,202,654	110	66,400	NX	宁
Xīn	65	Xinjiang Uyghur Autonomous Region	新疆维吾尔自治区; Xīnjiāng Wéiwú'ěr Zìzhìqū	Ürümqi	25,852,345	16	1,660,400	XJ	新

== Cities with urban area over one million in population ==
#	City	Urban area	District area	City proper	Prov.	Census date
1	Xi'an	11,904,805	12,283,922	12,952,907	SN	2020
2	Ürümqi	3,575,000		4,054,369	XJ	2020
3	Lanzhou	3,474,858	3,042,863	4,359,446	GS	2020
4	Yinchuan	1,901,793	1,901,793	2,859,074	NX	2020
5	Xining	1,954,795	1,954,795	2,467,965	QH	2020
6	Baoji	1,862,118	1,475,962	3,321,853	SN	2020
7	Tianshui	1,212,791	1,212,791	1,212,791	GS	2020

== See also ==
- Ma clique
- Tangut
- China Western Development
