= List of regions of China =

This is a list of traditional top-level regions of China.

== People's Republic of China ==
=== Statistical regions ===
This is a list of the 34 provincial-level divisions of the People's Republic of China grouped by its former greater administrative areas from 1949 to 1952.

North China
East China
Southwestern China
South Central China
Northeast China
Northwestern China

Region	Map	Area	Population (2010)	Population Density	Provinces/Region	Provincial/Regional Seat
North China 华北 (Huáběi)		2,185,105 km^{2}	164,823,136	75/km^{2}	Beijing	Tongzhou District
North China 华北 (Huáběi)		2,185,105 km^{2}	164,823,136	75/km^{2}	Tianjin	Hexi District
North China 华北 (Huáběi)		2,185,105 km^{2}	164,823,136	75/km^{2}	Hebei	Shijiazhuang
North China 华北 (Huáběi)		2,185,105 km^{2}	164,823,136	75/km^{2}	Shanxi	Taiyuan
North China 华北 (Huáběi)		2,185,105 km^{2}	164,823,136	75/km^{2}	Inner Mongolia	Hohhot
East China 华东 (Huádōng)		795,837 km^{2}	384,364,968	483/km^{2}	Shanghai	Huangpu District
East China 华东 (Huádōng)		795,837 km^{2}	384,364,968	483/km^{2}	Jiangsu	Nanjing
East China 华东 (Huádōng)		795,837 km^{2}	384,364,968	483/km^{2}	Zhejiang	Hangzhou
East China 华东 (Huádōng)		795,837 km^{2}	384,364,968	483/km^{2}	Anhui	Hefei
East China 华东 (Huádōng)		795,837 km^{2}	384,364,968	483/km^{2}	Fujian	Fuzhou (PRC); Kinmen (ROC-abolished)
East China 华东 (Huádōng)		795,837 km^{2}	384,364,968	483/km^{2}	Taiwan	Taipei (PRC-claimed); Zhongxing New Village (ROC-abolished)
East China 华东 (Huádōng)		795,837 km^{2}	384,364,968	483/km^{2}	Jiangxi	Nanchang
East China 华东 (Huádōng)		795,837 km^{2}	384,364,968	483/km^{2}	Shandong	Jinan
Southwestern China 西南 (Xīnán)		2,365,900 km^{2}	192,979,243	82/km^{2}	Chongqing	Yuzhong District
Southwestern China 西南 (Xīnán)		2,365,900 km^{2}	192,979,243	82/km^{2}	Sichuan	Chengdu
Southwestern China 西南 (Xīnán)		2,365,900 km^{2}	192,979,243	82/km^{2}	Guizhou	Guiyang
Southwestern China 西南 (Xīnán)		2,365,900 km^{2}	192,979,243	82/km^{2}	Yunnan	Kunming
Southwestern China 西南 (Xīnán)		2,365,900 km^{2}	192,979,243	82/km^{2}	Tibet	Lhasa
South Central China 中南 (Zhōngnán)		1,014,354 km^{2}	383,559,808	378/km^{2}	Henan	Zhengzhou
South Central China 中南 (Zhōngnán)		1,014,354 km^{2}	383,559,808	378/km^{2}	Hubei	Wuhan
South Central China 中南 (Zhōngnán)		1,014,354 km^{2}	383,559,808	378/km^{2}	Hunan	Changsha
South Central China 中南 (Zhōngnán)		1,014,354 km^{2}	383,559,808	378/km^{2}	Guangdong	Guangzhou
South Central China 中南 (Zhōngnán)		1,014,354 km^{2}	383,559,808	378/km^{2}	Guangxi	Nanning
South Central China 中南 (Zhōngnán)		1,014,354 km^{2}	383,559,808	378/km^{2}	Hainan	Haikou
Northeast China 东北 (Dōngběi)		791,826 km^{2}	98,514,948	124/km^{2}	Liaoning	Shenyang
Northeast China 东北 (Dōngběi)		791,826 km^{2}	98,514,948	124/km^{2}	Jilin	Changchun
Northeast China 东北 (Dōngběi)		791,826 km^{2}	98,514,948	124/km^{2}	Heilongjiang	Harbin
Northwestern China 西北 (Xīběi)		3,107,900 km^{2}	103,528,786	31/km^{2}	Shaanxi	Xi'an
Northwestern China 西北 (Xīběi)		3,107,900 km^{2}	103,528,786	31/km^{2}	Gansu	Lanzhou
Northwestern China 西北 (Xīběi)		3,107,900 km^{2}	103,528,786	31/km^{2}	Qinghai	Xining
Northwestern China 西北 (Xīběi)		3,107,900 km^{2}	103,528,786	31/km^{2}	Ningxia	Yinchuan
Northwestern China 西北 (Xīběi)		3,107,900 km^{2}	103,528,786	31/km^{2}	Xinjiang	Ürümqi

==== Other kinds of statistics ====
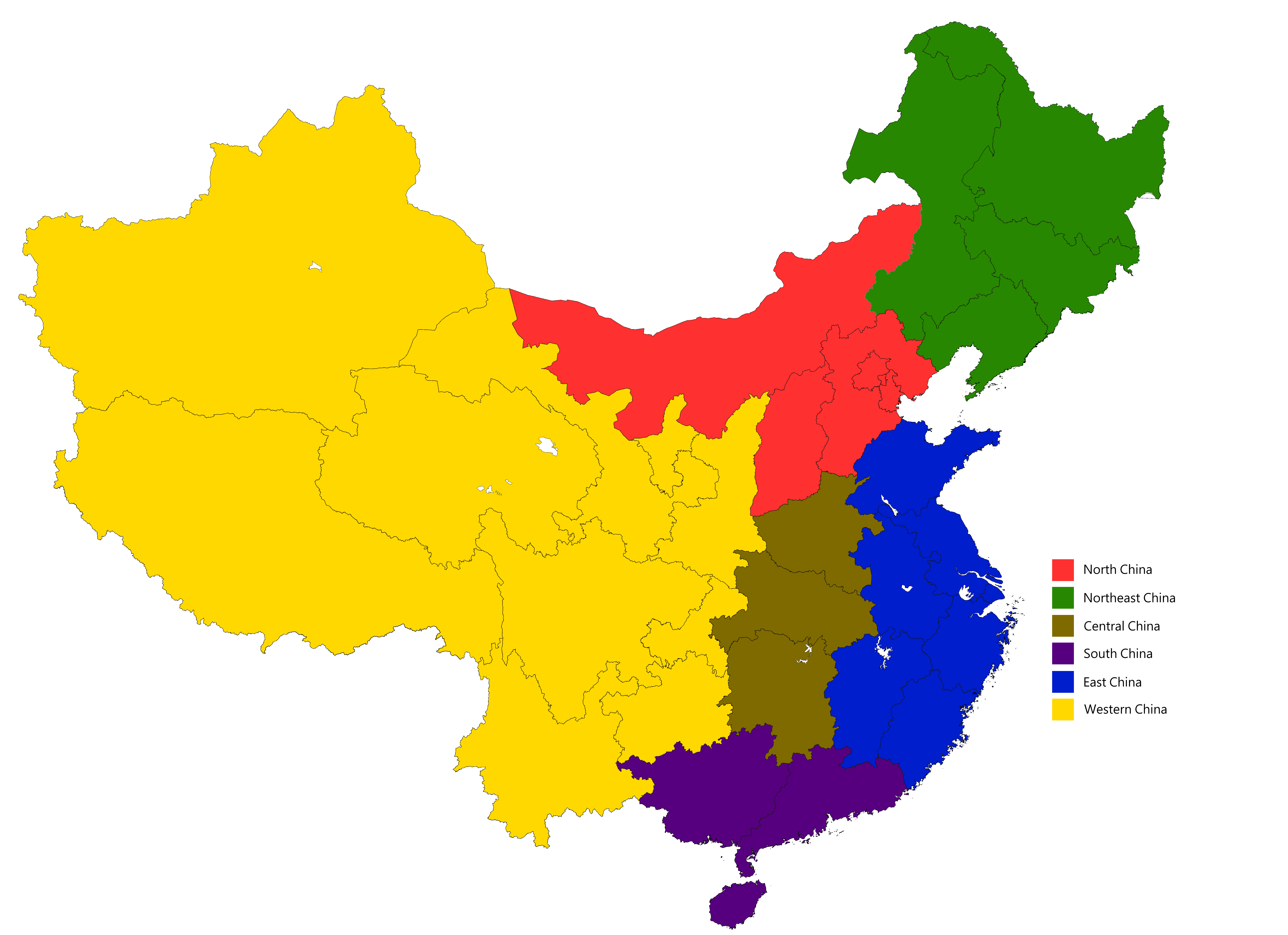

Region	Area	Population (2010)	Population Density	Provinces included & Notes
North China (without Eastern Inner Mongolia)	1,082,492 km^{2}	153,180,300	142/km^{2}	Beijing, Tianjin, Hebei, Shanxi, and Inner Mongolia (without Chifeng, Hinggan, Hulunbuir, and Tongliao)
Northeast China (with Eastern Inner Mongolia)	1,266,869 km^{2}	121,163,770	96/km^{2}	Liaoning, Jilin, Heilongjiang, and Eastern Inner Mongolia (Chifeng, Hinggan, Hulunbuir, and Tongliao)
East China	832,028 km^{2}	407,527,091	499/km^{2}	The above-mentioned seven entities plus the claimed Taiwan Province. Taiwan and its surrounding island groups are administered by the Republic of China but claimed by the People's Republic of China.
Central China	564,700 km^{2}	216,945,029	384/km^{2}	Henan, Hubei, and Hunan
South China	449,654 km^{2}	166,614,779	371/km^{2}	Guangdong, Guangxi, Hainan, Hong Kong, and Macau
Western China	3,978,700 km^{2}	289,623,281	73/km^{2}	Chongqing, Sichuan, Guizhou, Yunnan, Tibet, Shaanxi, Gansu, Qinghai, Ningxia, and Xinjiang

=== Economic regions ===

East Coast
Western China
Central China
Northeast China

=== PLA military regions ===
The five theater commands of the PLA

== See also ==
- Administrative divisions of China
- List of ecoregions in China
- Northern and southern China
- Physiographic macroregions of China
- Regional discrimination in China
- History of the administrative divisions of China (1912–1949)
