= Northeast China =

Geographical region

- Region
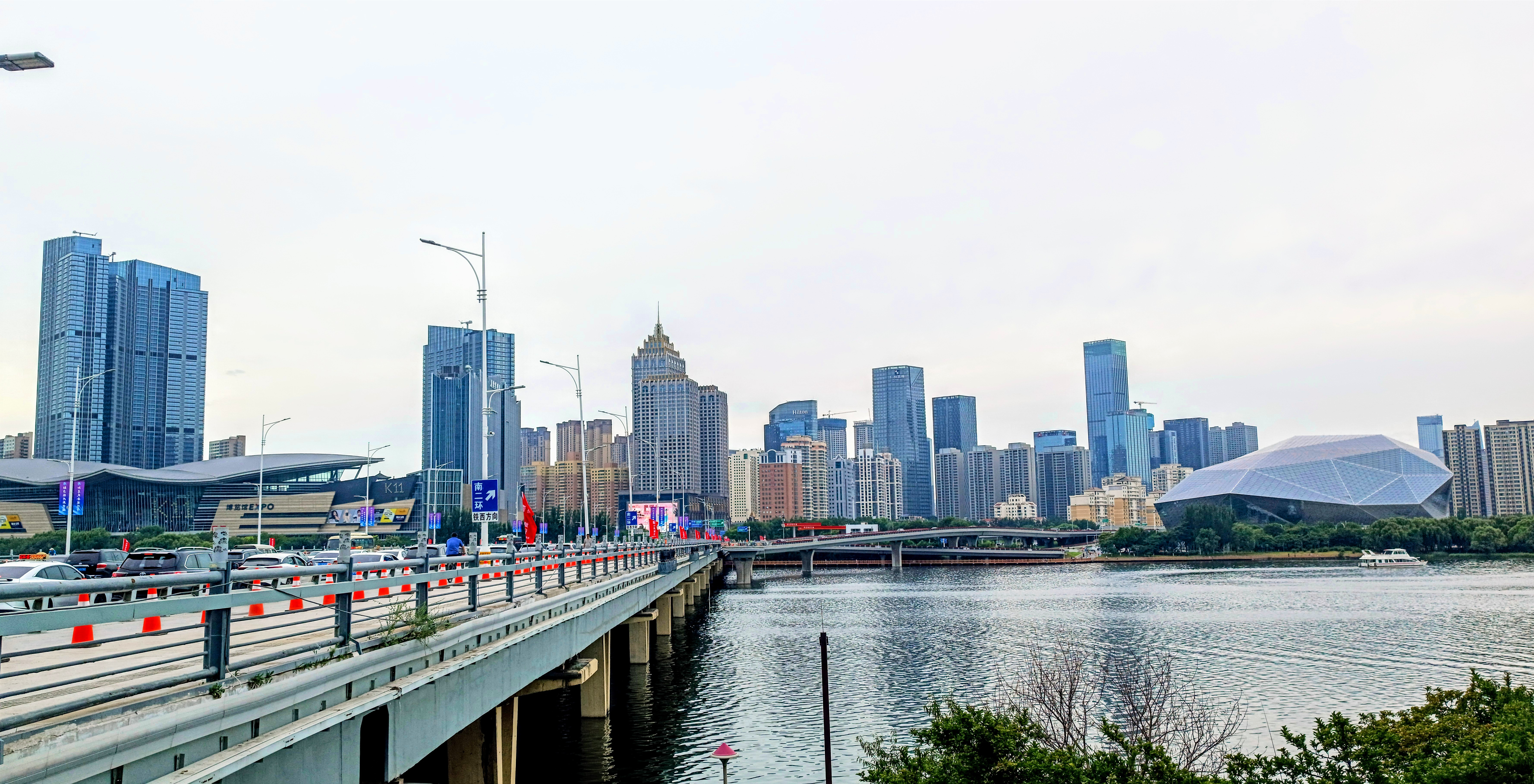
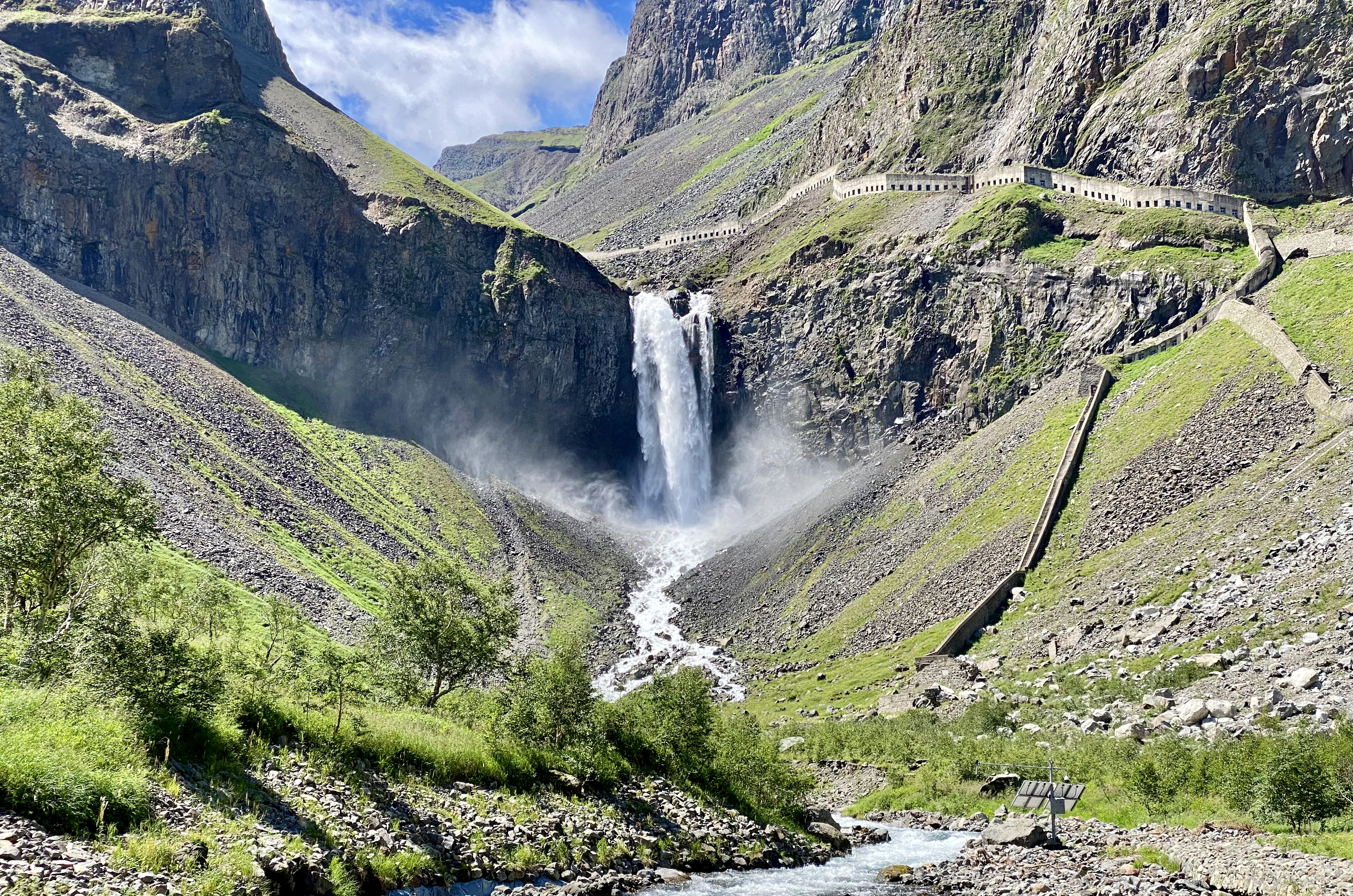
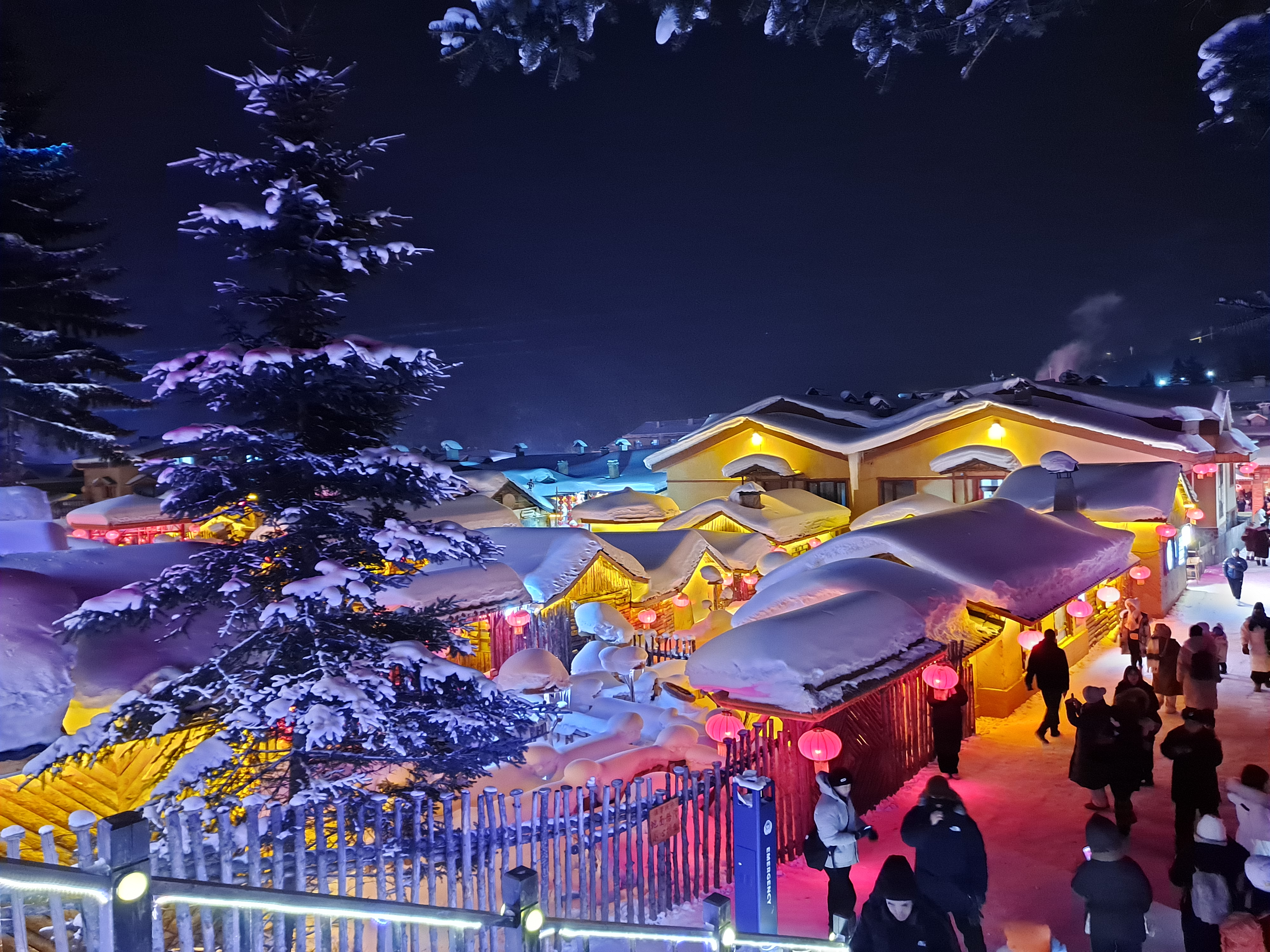
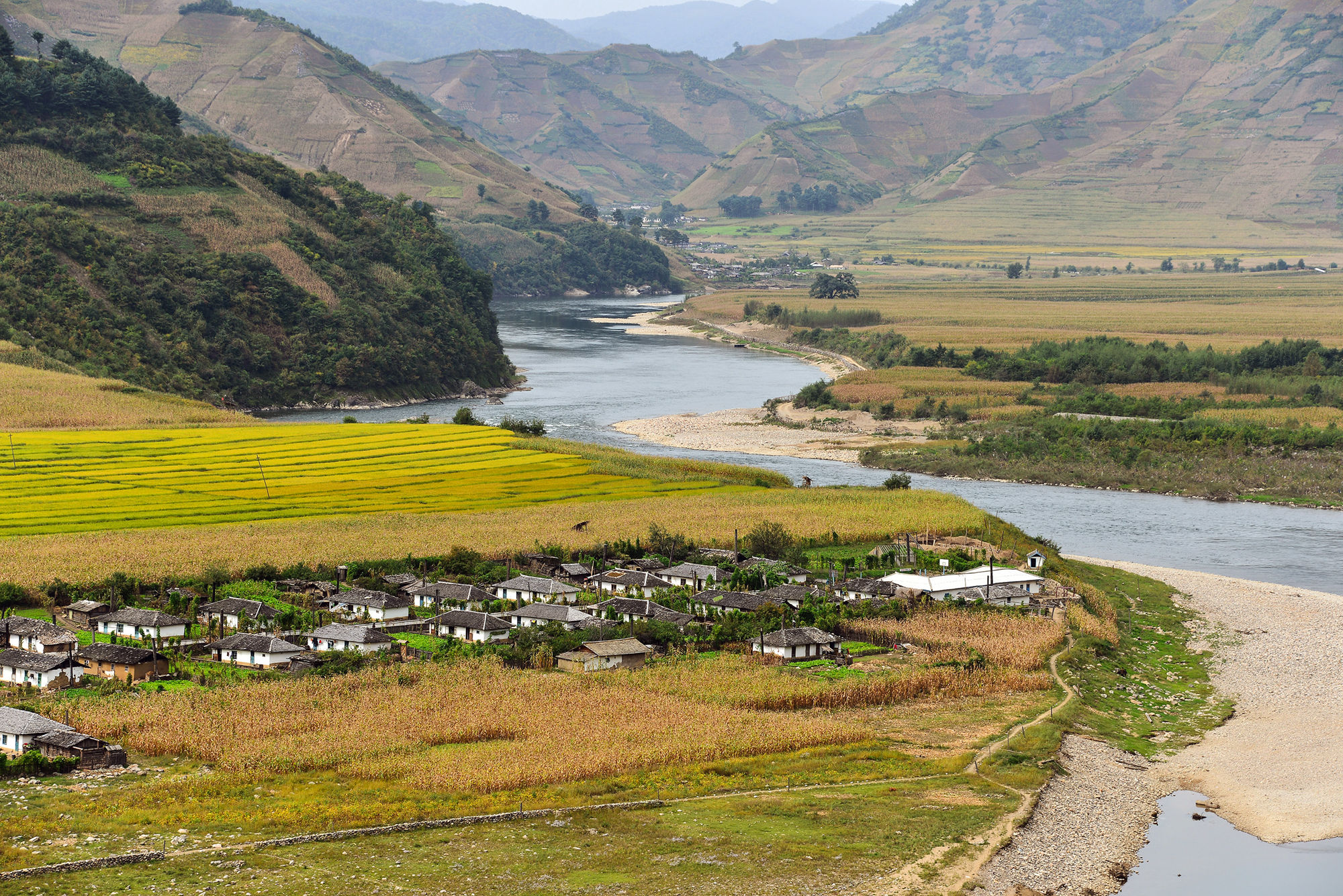
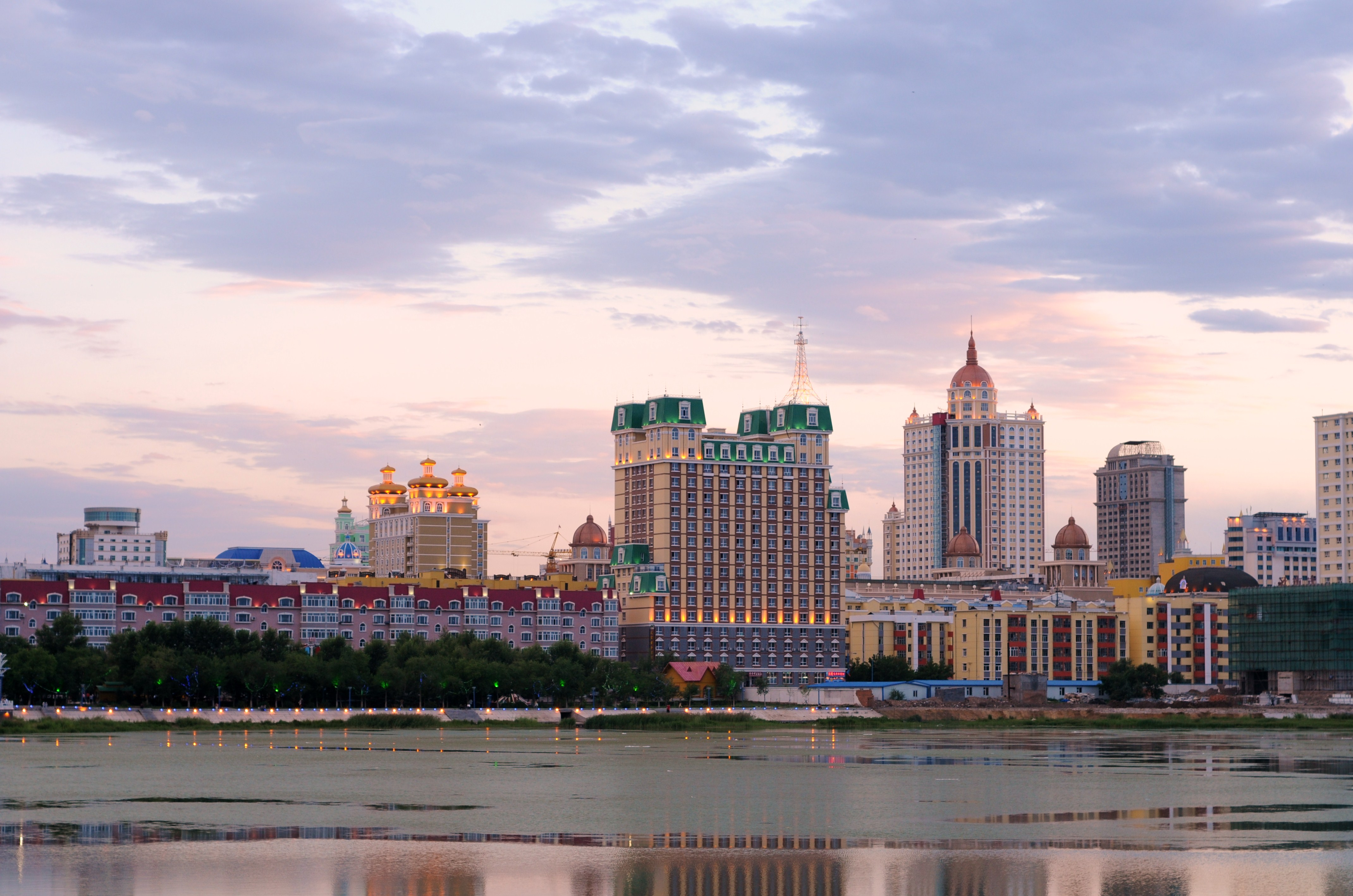
- Shenyang Changbai Mountains Xuexiang National Forest Park Yalu River Manzhouli

- Northeast China in dark red
- Country: China
- Largest city: Shenyang

Area
  - Total: 791,826 km^{2} (305,726 sq mi)

Population
  - Total: 98,514,948
  - Density: 124/km^{2} (320/sq mi)

GDP (nominal, 2024)
  - Total: CN¥6.35 trillion (US$983.72 billion)
  - Per capita: CN¥66,493 (US$10,308.99)

Northeast China (Chinese: 东北; pinyin: Dōngběi) is a geographical region of China, consisting officially of the provinces Liaoning, Jilin, and Heilongjiang. The heartland of the region is the Northeast China Plain, China's largest plain, with an area of over 350,000 km^{2} (140,000 sq mi). The region is separated from the Russian Far East to the north and east by the Amur, Argun and Ussuri Rivers; from North Korea to the south by the Yalu and Tumen Rivers; and from North China to the west by the Greater Khingan Range and Yan Mountains. It is also bounded by the Bohai Bay and Yellow Sea to the southwest, about 100 km (62 mi) from East China's Jiaodong Peninsula across the Bohai Strait, due to be connected via a proposed undersea tunnel.

The four prefectures of Inner Mongolia (which is part of North China) east of the Greater Khingan, i.e. Chifeng, Tongliao, Hinggan and Hulunbuir, are sometimes also considered part of Northeast China, and together with the aforementioned three provinces form what was historically known as Inner Manchuria, in contrast to the Outer Manchuria (or "Outer Northeast" in Chinese literatures) annexed by the Russian Empire during the mid-19th century.

Northeast China is one of the country's most important breadbaskets due to its fertile black soil, producing over 20% of China's total staple food production in 2020. It was also one of the first regions of China to undergo industrialization, and the pioneering region during the planned economy era that followed the founding of the People's Republic of China, earning it the honorific nickname "the Republic's eldest son" (Chinese: 共和国长子; pinyin: gònghéguó zhǎngzǐ). Since the Chinese economic reform of the 1980s, which mostly benefited the coastal provinces in East and South China that have direct access to export sea routes and foreign investments, the Northeast's once-powerful industrial sector has shrunk significantly, with stagnant economic growth, mass layoffs from state-owned enterprises during the late 1990s—a process known as Xiagang (下岗)—and ongoing exodus of skilled population since the turn of the 21st century, leading the region to sometimes be called China's Rust Belt. To salvage the situation, the Northeast Area Revitalization Plan was launched in 2003 by the State Council and the newly ascended Hu–Wen Administration, in which five prefectures of eastern Inner Mongolia, namely Hulunbuir, Hinggan, Tongliao, Chifeng and Xilin Gol, are also formally defined as regions of the Northeast.

== Names ==
The name Manchuria is an exonym of Japanese origin, derived from the endonym Manchu and first used in the 18th or 19th century but not by the Manchus or Chinese people. Variations of Manchuria arrived in European languages through Dutch, as a calque of the Japanese Manshū (満州; lit. 'Region of the Manchus'). The toponym has since become associated with Japanese colonialism. Its use is considered controversial by historians such as Mark C. Elliott, Norman Smith, and Mariko Asano Tamanoi, who question its legitimacy. In China, areas once considered part of Manchuria are called the Northeast.

The area historically had various names. During the Ming dynasty, the region in which the Jurchens lived was a military administrative commission named Nurgan. The Qing dynasty used names such as Guandong (simplified Chinese: 关东; traditional Chinese: 關東; pinyin: Guāndōng; lit. 'east of the Pass') (Note: Not to be confused with the unrelated Guangdong) or the Three Eastern Provinces (東三省; 东三省; Dōngsānshěng) referring to Jilin, Heilongjiang and Fengtian (modern Liaoning) since 1683 when Heilongjiang split from Jilin.

== Administrative divisions ==
GB	ISO No.	Province	Chinese Name	Capital	Population	Density	Area (km^{2})	Abbr.	
Liáo	21	Liaoning	辽宁省; Liáoníng Shěng	Shenyang	43,746,323	299.83	145,900	LN	辽
Jí	22	Jilin	吉林省; Jílín Shěng	Changchun	27,462,297	146.54	191,126	JL	吉
Hēi	23	Heilongjiang	黑龙江省; Hēilóngjiāng Shěng	Harbin	38,312,224	84.38	454,800	HL	黑

== Cities with urban area over one million in population ==
Provincial capitals in bold.

#	City	Urban area	District area	City proper	Prov.	Census date
1	**Shenyang**	5,718,232	6,255,921	8,106,171	LN	2010-11-01
2	**Harbin**	4,933,054	5,878,939	10,635,971	HL	2010-11-01
3	Dalian	3,902,467	4,087,733	6,690,432	LN	2010-11-01
4	**Changchun**	3,411,209	4,193,073	7,674,439	JL	2010-11-01
5	Anshan	1,504,996	1,544,084	3,645,884	LN	2010-11-01
6	Jilin	1,469,722	1,975,121	4,413,157	JL	2010-11-01
7	Daqing	1,433,698	1,649,825	2,904,532	HL	2010-11-01
8	Fushun	1,318,808	1,431,014	2,138,090	LN	2010-11-01
9	Qiqihar	1,314,720	1,553,788	5,367,003	HL	2010-11-01
10	Benxi	1,000,128	1,094,294	1,709,538	LN	2010-11-01

== History ==
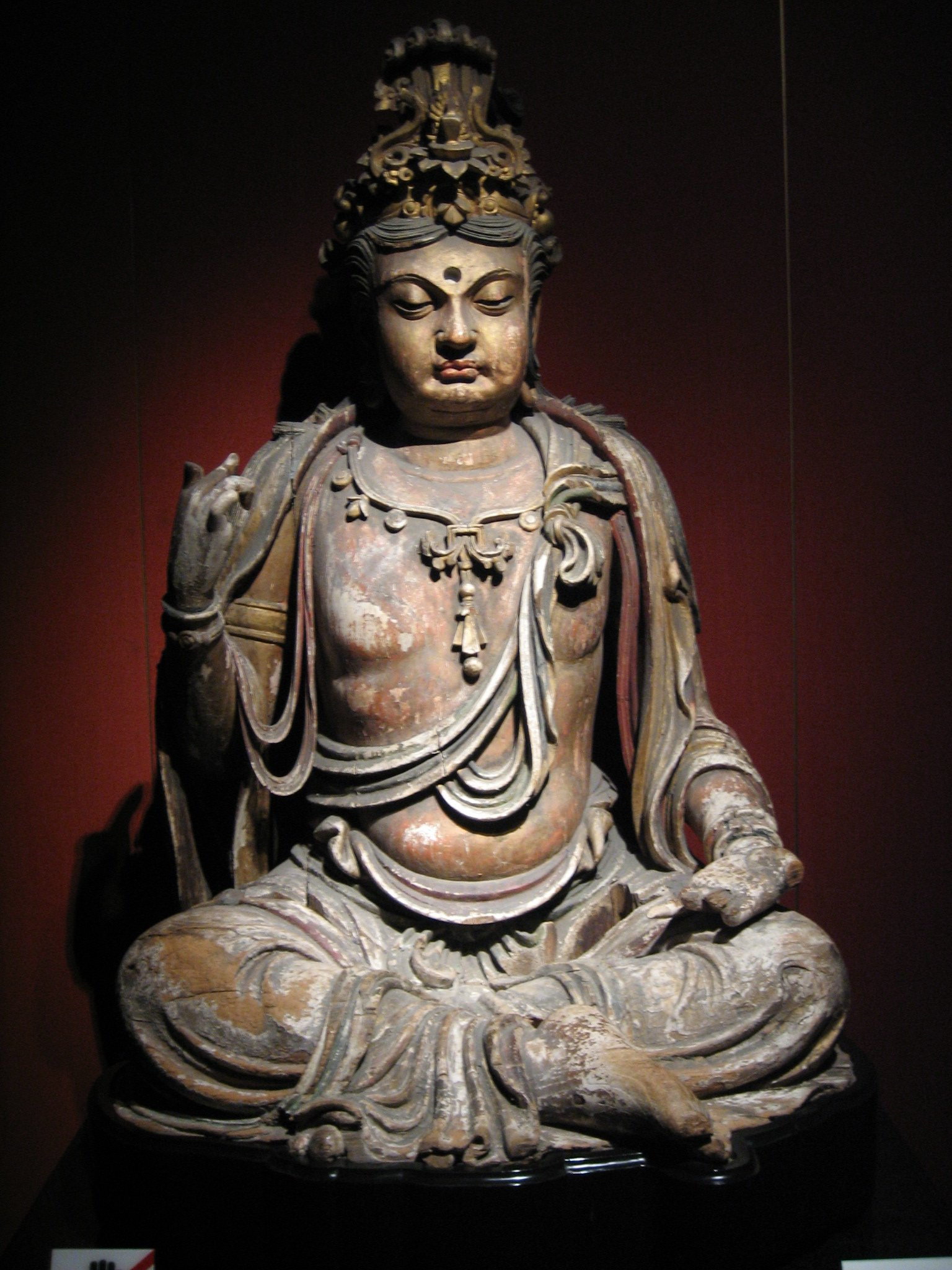
A wooden Bodhisattva statue from the Jin dynasty now housed in Shanghai Museum

Northeast China was the homeland of several ethnic groups, including the Koreans, Manchus (or Jurchens), Ulchs, Hezhen (also known as the Goldi and Nanai), Sushen, Xianbei, and Mohe. The Han Chinese have settled in Northeast China at several points in history, with the first Chinese kingdom to enter the area being the state of Yan. The region came under the rule of various states throughout history, including Yan, Gija Joseon, Wiman Joseon, Buyeo, Western Han, Goguryeo, Xin dynasty, Eastern Han, Gongsun Yan, Cao Wei, Western Jin, Former Yan, Former Qin, Later Yan, Tang dynasty, Wu Zhou, Balhae, Liao dynasty, Jin dynasty, Eastern Liao, Later Liao, Eastern Xia, Mongol Empire, Yuan dynasty, Northern Yuan, Ming dynasty, Qing dynasty, and Republic of China.

During the late Qing dynasty, Northeast China came under the Russian Empire's influence with the building of the Chinese Eastern Railway through Harbin to Vladivostok. The Empire of Japan replaced Russian influence in the region as a result of the Russo-Japanese War in 1904–1905, and Japan laid the South Manchurian Railway in 1906 to Port Arthur. During the Warlord Era in the Republic of China, Zhang Zuolin established himself in Northeast China, but was murdered by the Japanese for being too independent. The last Qing emperor, Puyi, was then placed on the throne to lead the Japanese puppet state of Manchukuo. After the atomic bombing of Japan in 1945, the Soviet Union invaded the region as part of its declaration of war against Japan. From 1945 to 1948, Northeast China was a base for the Communist People's Liberation Army in the Chinese Civil War. With the encouragement of the Soviet Union, the area was used as a staging ground during the Civil War for the Chinese Communists, who were victorious in 1949 and have been controlling this region since.

== Demographics ==
Northeast China has a total population of about 107,400,000, accounting for 8% of China's total population. The overwhelming majority of the population in the Northeast is Han Chinese, many of whose ancestors came in the 19th and 20th centuries during a migration movement called "Chuang Guandong" (simplified Chinese: 闯关东; traditional Chinese: 闖關東; lit. 'venture into the east of the Pass'). Northeast China historically had a significant Han Chinese population, reaching over 3 million by the end of the Ming dynasty, but they were subjected to eviction and assimilation by the conquest of the Qing dynasty, which then set up Willow Palisades during the reign of Shunzhi Emperor and prohibited any settlement of Han Chinese into the region. Despite officially prohibiting Han Chinese settlement, by the 18th century the Qing decided to settle Han into the Northeast so that Han Chinese farmed 500,000 hectares in the region by the 1780s. Besides moving into the Liao area in southern Manchuria, the path linking Jinzhou, Fengtian, Tieling, Changchun, Hulun, and Ningguta was settled by Han Chinese during the Qianlong Emperor's reign, and Han Chinese were the majority in urban areas of Manchuria by 1800. This resulted in the local Han Chinese population growing to over 20 million before the Second Sino-Japanese War. After the establishment of the People's Republic of China at the end of the Chinese Civil War, further immigrations were organized by the Central Government to "develop the Great Northern Wilderness" (开发北大荒), eventually peaking the population at over 100 million people.

Because most people in Northeast China trace their ancestries back to the migrants from the Chuang Guandong era, Northeastern China was more culturally uniform than other regions of China. People from the Northeast first identified themselves as "Northeasterners" (东北人) before affiliating to individual provinces and cities/towns.

Ethnic Manchus form the second significant ethnic group in Northeast China, followed by the Mongols, Koreans, the Huis, and 49 other ethnic minorities such as Daurs, Sibos, Hezhens, Oroqens, Evenks, and Kyrgyz. Also in the Northeast is the Yanbian Korean Autonomous Prefecture where ethnic Koreans make up roughly 35% of the population.

=== Religion ===
Taoism and Chinese Buddhism coexist alongside predominating Chinese folk religions led by local shamans. The region has also a strong presence of folk religions and Confucian churches.

== Economy ==
The Northeast was one of the earliest regions to industrialize in China during the era of Manchukuo. Many of what became Chinese state-owned enterprises in the region originated under Japanese colonialization, particularly in the Manchukuo puppet state.

After the founding of the People's Republic of China, Northeast China continued to be a major industrial base of the country, and has been hailed as "the Republic's eldest son" (共和国长子). Recent years, however, have seen the stagnation of Northeast China's heavy-industry-based economy, as China's economy continues to liberalize and privatize; the government has initialized the Revitalize the Northeast campaign to counter this problem, and established the Northeast Summit to improve policy coordination and integration. The region has experienced difficulty distancing itself from a planned economy, a legacy that began in 1905 with the establishment of the Japanese sphere of influence there. The region's once-abundant raw materials have also depleted and the economy has suffered from bureaucratic inefficiency and protectionist politics.

The region is, on the whole, more heavily urbanised than most parts of China, largely because it was the first part of the country to develop heavy industry owing to its abundant coal reserves. Major cities include Shenyang, Dalian, Harbin, Changchun and Anshan, all with several million inhabitants. Other cities include the steel making centres of Fushun and Anshan in Liaoning, Jilin City in Jilin, and Qiqihar and Mudanjiang in Heilongjiang. Harbin, more than any other city in China, possesses significant Russian influences: there are many Orthodox churches that have fallen out of use since the Cultural Revolution. Shenyang and Dalian, meanwhile, have sizable populations of Japanese and South Koreans due to their traditional linkages.

The Northeast is an important breadbasket region of China, as the Northeast China Plain has the largest stretch of arable flatland in the country, with an abundance of fertile black soil. The rural population heavily concentrated in the warmer southern part of the Northeast, where very warm to hot summer weather permits crops such as maize and millet to be grown with high yields. Soybeans and flax are also very important, as are wheat and barley. The region possesses large flocks of sheep, and pigs are abundant in the more densely settled southern part. The northern half of Heilongjiang is so cold and poorly drained that agriculture is almost impossible; however, the Amur River provides very rich fisheries, and sheep are even more abundant than in southern Heilongjiang.

Northeast China is the country's traditional industrial base, focusing mainly on equipment manufacturing. Major industries include the steel, automobile, shipbuilding, aircraft manufacturing, and petroleum refining industries. The Anshan Iron and Steel Works was the most important industrial enterprise in northeast China until the discovery of the Daqing Oil Field in 1959.

The region supplied many of the staff for the Third Front Construction of industrial bases in China's interior.

As a response to the return of sent-down youth, state-owned enterprises in the late 1970s and 1980s often started collectively-owned enterprises to create employment opportunities for the family of SOE workers. This approach to providing jobs for returning youth was particularly common in northeast China.

After Reform and Opening Up, much of the industry in China's northeast lagged in economic activity.

In the 2000s, the Chinese government developed the Northeast Area Revitalization Plan to counteract the economic stagnation that had resulted from an overreliance on state-own enterprises and heavy industry. However, the region has continued to struggle economically. In 2023, Heilongjian had the second-lowest GDP per person out of all Chinese provinces. An aging population and the net outward migration of young workers have introduced additional demographic challenges; in 2023, the population in Heilongjian was declining faster than any other province in China.

== Culture ==
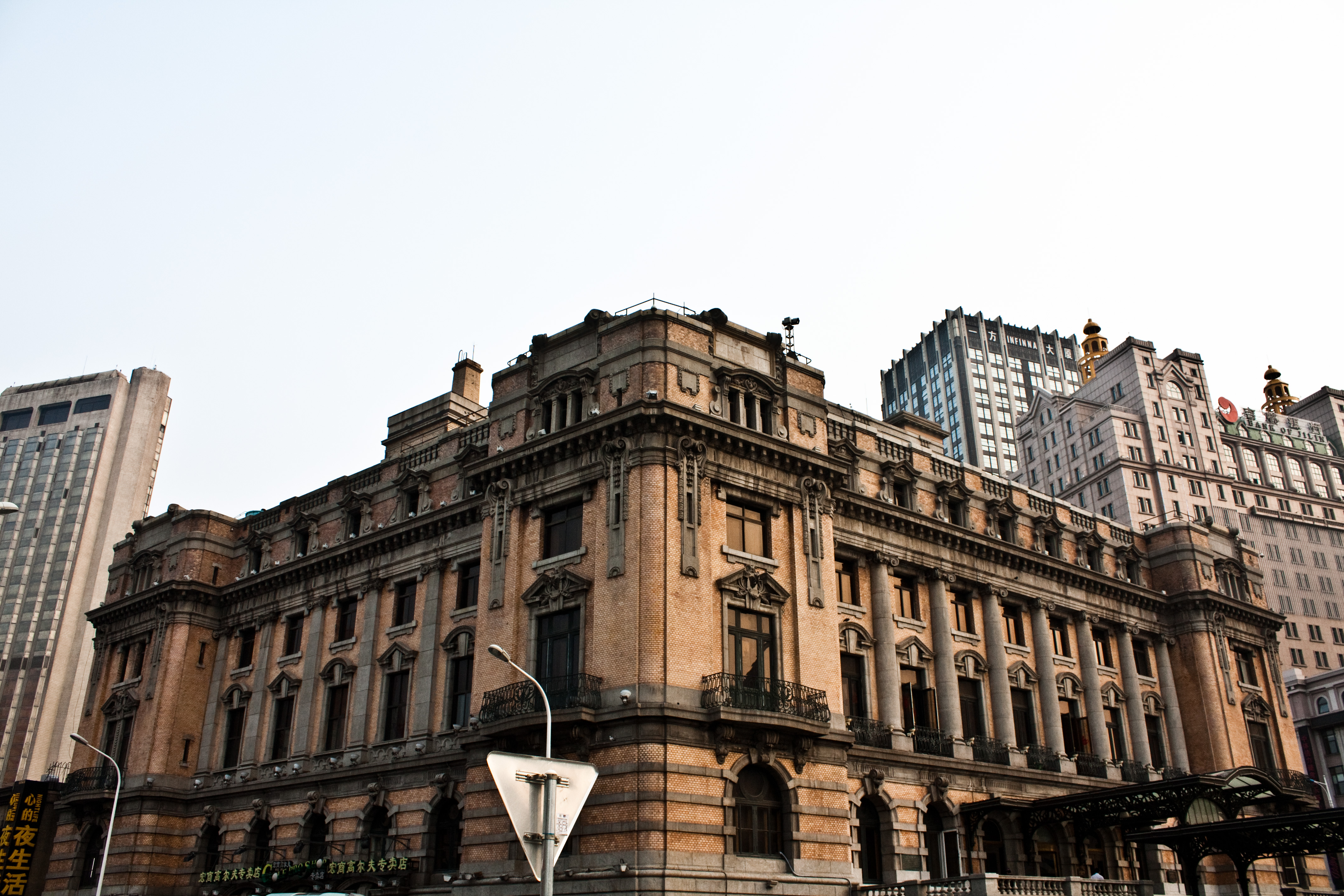
Dalian Hotel at Zhongshan Square in Dalian

In general, the culture of Northeast China takes its elements from the cultures of North China and Shandong, the hometowns of most of the Han Chinese who migrated into Northeast China during the Chuang Guandong. Northeast China also takes cultural inspiration from the Tungusic peoples.

=== Dialects ===
There are two main varieties of Mandarin Chinese spoken in Northeast China.

The most widely spoken lect is Northeastern Mandarin, commonly as dongbeihua (simplified Chinese: 东北话; traditional Chinese: 東北話; pinyin: Dōngběihuà; lit. 'northeastern speech'), spoken throughout Heilongjiang, Jilin, and most of Liaoning. It is very closely related to Standard Mandarin but with unique phonological and syntactic features colloquially known as the "corny accent" (Chinese: 大碴子味), and vocabulary differences, with some terms originating from Manchu, Japanese and even Russian. There are enough differences from Mandarin to give dongbeihua its own distinctive characteristics.

The second variety is Jiaoliao Mandarin, spoken in the Liaodong Peninsula, as well as the Jiaodong Peninsula in Shandong across the Bohai Strait. It is phonologically more different to Standard Mandarin than the more prevalent Northeastern Mandarin, and is colloquially called the "oystery accent" (Chinese: 海蛎子味) due to the dialect's coastal distribution.

Ethnic Manchus nowadays are very sinicized and speak mostly Northeastern Mandarin, and the Manchu language is almost extinct due to widespread assimilation to Han culture over the last four centuries. Ethnic Mongols tend to be bilingual in Mongolian tongues as well as Mandarin. Ethnic Koreans spoke both Mandarin (Northeastern or Jiaoliao, depending on locations) and a variety of Korean, the latter being very similar to North Korean standard language with some local variations corresponding to the regions of North Korea they border.

=== Cuisine ===
Northeastern Chinese cuisine reflects the region's ethnic diversity, blending Northern Han, Manchu and Korean cooking styles. One of its distinctive characteristics is the use of uncooked fresh vegetables. During the long winter season, pickled Chinese cabbage, called "suan cai", is preserved and used for cooking. Different from other parts of Northern China, rice is consumed more in Northeast China. Most of the meat dishes are based around pork due to how cold it can get. Often braised pork or dumplings are the main attraction of a meal.

=== Folk dance and sports ===
Errenzhuan, yangge, Jilin opera and stilts are popular forms of traditional entertainment in Northeast China. "Northeastern Cradle Song" is an example of the folk songs of this region.

Because of its climatic conditions, Northeast China is the base for China's winter sports. Ice hockey and ice skating athletes often come from or were educated in Northeast China.

=== Film, music, and literature ===
In 2019, the term Dongbei renaissance was coined by the rapper Gem to describe a revival in interest in the culture of the Northeast after his song Yelang Disco went viral. Artwork associated with the Dongbei renaissance often incorporates nostalgia for the "corny" aesthetics of the 1970s boom period of the Northeast, self-deprecating humor, and speculations on the decline and potential future of the economically depressed region. Notable works associated with the movement include Shuang Xuetao's fiction collection Moses on the Plain and the Diao Yinan film Black Coal, Thin Ice.

== Major universities ==
- Jilin University (吉林大学)
- Northeast Agricultural University (东北农业大学)
- Northeast Normal University (东北师范大学)
- Harbin Institute of Technology (哈尔滨工业大学)
- Northeastern University (东北大学)
- Liaoning University (辽宁大学)
- Shenyang Agricultural University (沈阳农业大学)
- Shenyang University of Chemical Technology (沈阳化工大学)
- Dalian University of Technology (大连理工大学)
- Dalian Maritime University (大连海事大学)
- Northeast Forestry University (东北林业大学)
- Shenyang Normal University (沈阳师范大学)
- Changchun University of Science and Technology (长春理工大学)
- Northeast Petroleum University (东北石油大学)
- Shenyang Aerospace University (沈阳航空航天大学)
- Harbin Engineering University (哈尔滨工程大学)
- Heilongjiang University (黑龙江大学)
- Dongbei University of Finance and Economics (东北财经大学)

== See also ==
- Outer Manchuria – Historical region in Northeast Asia
